= Wianamatta Group =

Geologic formation in Australia

- Stratigraphic range: Carnian
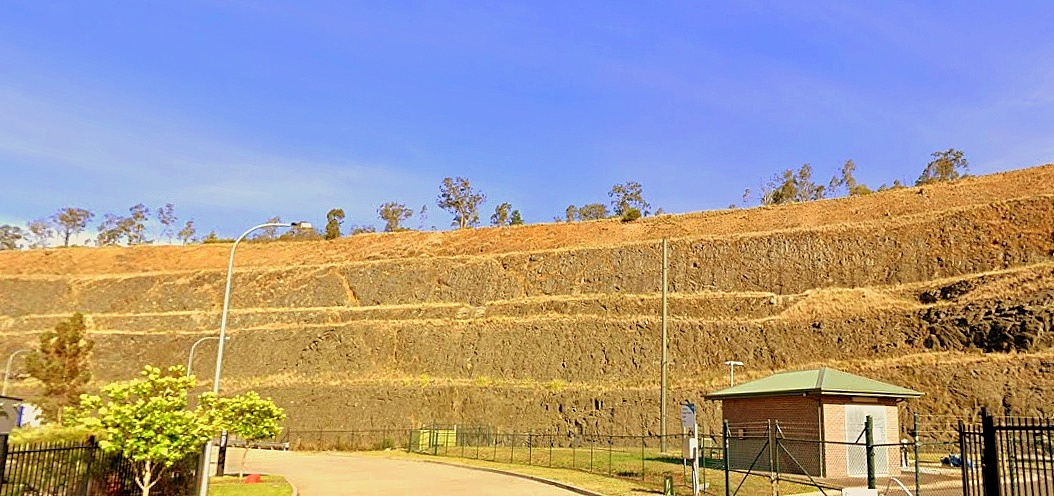
- Exposed rock at the Prospect dolerite intrusion site, comprising strata of the Wianamatta Group
- Type: Geological formation
- Sub-units: Bringelly Shale, Minchinbury Sandstone and Ashfield Shale
- Underlies: Hawkesbury Sandstone
- Overlies: Narrabeen Group
- Thickness: 200–400 metres (660–1,310 ft)

Lithology
- Primary: Shale, sandstone
- Other: Ironstone, siltstone, mudstone, claystone, rare argillaceous limestone and coal

Location
- Location: Western Sydney, South-western Sydney
- Region: Cumberland Plain, Sydney
- Country: Australia
- Extent: Sydney Basin

The Wianamatta Group is a geological feature of the Sydney Basin, New South Wales, Australia that directly overlies the older (but still Triassic in age) Hawkesbury sandstone. The formation is primarily composed of shales with interbedded lithic sandstones, resulting in generally flat topography as the shales erode. The Wianamatta Group was derived from the Aboriginal name for South Creek. Other names for the group include Wianamatta Beds, Wianamatta Formation and Wianamatta Series.

The Wianamatta Formation is the youngest geological layer member of the Sydney Basin, and therefore lies at the highest point as the highest layer member. It was deposited in connection with a large river delta, which shifted over time from west to east. The Wianamatta Group is made up of the following units (listed in stratigraphic order): Bringelly Shale, Minchinbury Sandstone and Ashfield Shale. Based on their general characteristics and lithologic associations, the sandstones of the Wianamatta Group are described as graywacke-type sandstones. Overall, the Wianamatta Group records a regressive clastic shoreline, with depositional environments progressing upward through four main settings: seaward marine shelf, beach and barrier island, lagoonal and tidal flat complex, and fluvial coastal plain.

The post-sedimentary tectonic history of the group is closely linked to the structural evolution of the Sydney Basin as a whole. Within the present geographic extent, the Wianamatta Group is largely confined to the Cumberland Plain. Weathering of the shale units produces a rich clayey soil, often with poor drainage. Although the Wianamatta Formation received some attention from local researchers in the early 20th century, it was formally defined in 1952, comprehensively documented in 1954, and subsequently revised in 1979.

== Grouping ==
Exposed Wianamatta Formation at Prospect Highway, Pemulwuy

The Wianamatta Group is divided into two subgroups: the Liverpool Subgroup – lower, approximately 120 metres (390 ft) thick, predominantly shale, and the Camden Subgroup – upper, approximately 106 metres (348 ft) thick, with sandstone prominent but also containing shale. The Liverpool Subgroup comprises three compositions: Ashfield Shale, Bringelly Shale and Minchinbury Sandstone. The Camden Subgroup comprises five formations: Annan Shale, Razorback Sandstone, Potts Hill Sandstone, Picton Formation, and Prudhoe Shale. The sedimentary lithology of the graywacke sandstone types and their relationship to the sedimentary setting and tectonic setting has been described. A new classification element, the depositional environment, has been proposed to complement the previously defined lithotope for characterizing lithologic sequences. Post-depositional tectonics have also been discussed, including a recent succession of tectonic features identified in the south-western suburbs of Sydney.

Potts Hill Sandstone and the Razorback Sandstone are limited in extent and cannot be reliably traced beyond their type localities. Consequently, they are unsuitable as boundary markers for subdivisions between units such as the Camden and Liverpool Subgroups. Therefore, all strata over the Minchinbury Sandstone are classified as part of the Bringelly Shale, with the prominent sandstone layers treated as individual members. Naming the Wianamatta sequence, early authors used "Wianamatta Beds," "Formation," or "Shales," while Leslie Wilkinson (1882) applied "Wianamatta Series," and Carl Süssmilch (1911) used "Wianamatta Stage." Thomas Lindsay Willan (1923) separated the Wianamatta Group into these layers – upper, middle, and lower, though the criteria for these divisions were not fully described. His 1925 Sydney District map showed the stages, but the classification has not been widely adopted due to difficulties reconciling the outcrop patterns with the brief stage descriptions. The lower stage was approximately 60 metres (200 ft) of carbonous and clay shales with several basal sandy beds. This Formation was inferred to represent a cycle of basin infilling associated with the migration of a large delta front from west to east.

The Ashfield Shale was deposited in a low energy marine environment and preserves laminated silty sediments. The Minchinbury Sandstone comprises a set of sandy barrier islands at the former shoreline. The Bringelly Shale was deposited in a swampy alluvial plain with meandering streams flowing from the west forming discontinuous beds of sandstone. The Liverpool Subgroup, which lies directly above the Hawkesbury Sandstone, is dominated by shale, with two shale formations having been mapped. A centrally located sandstone formation approximately 6 metres (20 ft) thick is present, but shale remains the principal lithology. The subgroup has a fairly consistent thickness of about 120 metres (390 ft). The shales of the Liverpool Subgroup define the primary rural zones of the Cumberland Basin and Camden region and provide a significant source of fresh material for brickmaking and ceramics industries. The constitutions of the Liverpool Subgroup encompass nearly the whole protrusion area of the Group. The Camden Subgroup is separated from the Liverpool Subgroup by a thick sandstone formation. It consists of a succession of interchanging sandstones and shales, with sandstone being more prominent. The subgroup exhibits variable thickness, reaching a maximum of approximately 105 metres (344 ft) in the Razorback section. The Razorback Range serves as the type region for the Camden Subgroup. The type section is located by the Hume Highway at southern side of Razorback.

The Wianamatta Group exhibits a continuous sedimentary sequence, with no major breaks, indicating deposition as a largely uninterrupted progression of environments across the region. The sequence records a transition from marine to terrestrial settings, becoming progressively more sandy toward the top. The basal Ashfield Shale consists of shallow marine black siltstone that grades upward into laminated fine sandstone exhibiting holes and ripple traces. Overlying this, the Minchinbury Sandstone, characterized by low-angle cross-bedding, represents a beach and barrier-bar system that protected an intertidal lagoon, recorded as a laminite sequence over six metres thick, containing invertebrate burrows, desiccation fissures, and ripple structures. The basal part of the Bringelly Shale continues this lagoonal deposition and transitions upward into closely interbedded laminite and carbonaceous claystones of intertidal flats and marshes, preserving abundant fossil roots and sporadic coal layers. Upper in the Bringelly Shale, interstratified light grey and carbonaceous claystones with pervasive fossil roots grow common, suggesting incipient soil development in swampy environments. Laminites in this interval are less volumetrically significant, lack burrowing structures, and contain thick carbonaceous root sills and affected bedding, interpreted as levees associated with streams and tidal creeks. Cross-bedded sandstone channels, up to 20 metres (66 ft) thick and with erosive contacts, represent fluvial and estuarine channels.

== Research history ==
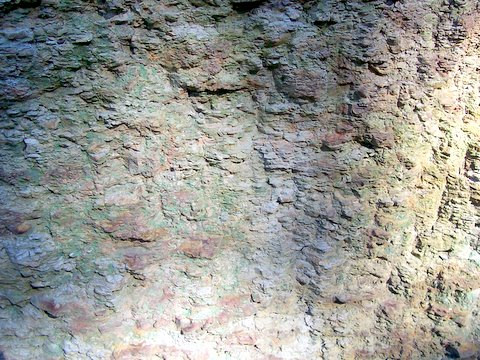
Exposed Ashfield Shale of the Wianamatta group, by the Pacific Highway, Chatswood

George Davenport Osborne (1948) highlighted the overall shortage of data on the Triassic sequence in the region, which prompted further study. The primary objective was to examine outcrops of the Wianamatta Group and determine whether consistent, mappable divisions could be established based on lithology, divisions that had previously been regarded as difficult or impossible to map. Fieldwork, combined with the interpretation of available borehole data, demonstrated that such divisions are indeed consistent and can be mapped. The work was intended to provide practical value to engineers and geologists working for public utilities and other agencies concerned with the rock types in the Sydney Basin. The first description of the rocks now recognized as the Wianamatta Formation was by geologist Joseph Jukes (1847), who observed:

"From Parramatta by Liverpool to Campbelltown the country is low, gently undulating and composed almost entirely of black and brown shales, with a few thin inter-stratified beds of sandstone in their lower portion."

Jukes identified these strata as lying over the Sydney Sandstone (now called the Hawkesbury Sandstone) and estimated their thickness at at least 90 metres (300 ft). The following year, Clarke (1848) provided further observations and used the term "Wianamatta Rocks" for the first time. Between 1848 and 1870, Clarke occasionally referred to the "Wianamatta beds," and in 1870 he provided a more detailed description, estimating a total thickness of 240 metres (790 ft)–275 metres (902 ft). Clarke’s final description in 1878 observed that the group succeeded the Hawkesbury Sandstone and consisted primarily of shales, but also included sandstones, calcareous sandstones, ferruginous nodules, and locally cylindrical and pisolitic ironstone with profuse fossil wood, plant prints, and calcareous sandstones forming the uppermost degrees and peaks of remote hills – approximately 335.2 metres (1,100 ft)–395 metres (1,296 ft). Small, discontinuous patches of coal were present, but no economically valuable seams were observed. In 1883, Tenison-Woods challenged Clarke’s definition, suggesting that the shales did not overlie the Hawkesbury Sandstone but were intercalated with it, and therefore no distinct Wianamatta formation existed. This criticism has not been confirmed, and Clarke’s description is now usually accepted.

Regarding age, the Wianamatta Group was initially assigned to the Palaeozoic by Jukes (1847). Clarke first considered it Carboniferous but later recognized a Mesozoic age, and Charles Smith Wilkinson (1882) suggested it was probably Triassic, which became generally accepted. Willan (1923, 1925) described the bottom and center levels as Upper Triassic, while suggesting the Upper Stage might be Jurassic based on Frederick Chapman's (1909) identification of foraminifera and ostracoda; however, these identifications are now considered doubtful. David F. Branagan (1950) concluded that fossil evidence indicates an Upper Triassic age for the “Wianamatta Series,” but noted that fossils are limited to a narrow zone less than 30 metres (98 ft) above the Hawkesbury Sandstone. Therefore, the Upper Triassic designation can only be confidently applied to a small portion of the Group, while the remaining 200 metres (660 ft) may be Jurassic, though this remains speculative. For the purposes of modern classification, the Wianamatta Group is simply considered Triassic in age. While not typically high-rank graywackes, these rocks show features approaching subgraywackes, a distinction reflected in the terminology. For field descriptions and formation names, the word “sandstone” is withheld as the general designation. Some analyses of exceptional samples indicate compositions closer to true graywackes, whereas sections of the Potts Hill Sandstone display characteristics more closely related to feldspathic quartzites.

In 1964, the Australian Oil and Gas Corporation drilled the Fairfield-1 exploratory well in Wakeley, as part of petroleum exploration of the Sydney Basin. The well was located at a ground elevation of 22.3 m (73 ft), and reached a total depth of 855.3 m (2,806 ft) below ground level. Drilling began in the Wianamatta Group, with the well entering the Hawkesbury Sandstone at a depth of 73.5 m (241 ft) and the underlying Narrabeen Group at 312.1 m (1,024 ft). The Narrabeen Group consisted of interbedded siltstone and poorly sorted sandstone, with subordinate mudstone and shale, deposited in an alluvial floodplain environment. Gas was encountered in several sandstone layers within the Narrabeen Group. Drill-stem tests at depths of 496 m (1,627 ft) and 542 m (1,778 ft) produced initial gas flows of 821 m^{3} (29,000 ft^{3}) and 1,862 m^{3} (65,800 ft^{3}) per day, respectively; in both cases, the gas consisted of approximately 96% carbon dioxide. The well was drilled into an elongated northeast–southwest-oriented anticline. Fairfield-1 was subsequently classified as a gas discovery, although it was not commercially developed. The drilling provided subsurface information about the central Sydney Basin, including the sequence of Triassic sedimentary rocks underlying the Fairfield–Wakeley area.

== Geology ==
Exposed sediments on Prospect Highway, Pemulwuy.

From an engineering perspective, the rocks, residual soils, and transported weathered debris of the Wianamatta Group are as significant as those of the Sydney Sandstone. The Wianamatta Group underlies much of western Sydney, extending from south of Campbelltown to Windsor, which is approximately 60 kilometres (37 mi) north), and eastwards through Liverpool, Parramatta, Ashfield, and into the southern part of the central business district (including Sydney University and Central Station). It also forms the ridges along which the Pacific Highway runs from North Sydney through St Leonards, Chatswood, and Hornsby, as well as high ground in areas such as Eastwood, Pennant Hills, and Castle Hill. The thickest recorded section is 304 metres (997 ft), observed in a borehole at Razorback Mountain, roughly 15 kilometres (9.3 mi) southwest of Campbelltown. The sequence of strata clearly show the transition from marine deposits in front of the delta to deposits on land: Ashfield shale was formed from clayey marine sediments. The subsequent Minchinbury Sandstone emerged from beach - Nehrungs Islands. The Bringelly shale became alluvial in a marshy plain deposited on the delta, meandered through the rivers, and deposited sand at various locations, each of which was narrowly defined, which later solidified into sandstone.

Clay soils in the area are recognised as being reactive with appreciable shrink-swell capacity. Today's weathering of the surface of the existing claystone produces abundant clay, which leads to the formation of clay soils with low water permeability, as they occur, for example, on the Cumberland Plain widespread. Here are podsol floors widespread that swell when supplying water and shrink during drying. Over the pitches of the Wianamatta Group, water-bearing layers can form. Deep and large clay deposits of this formation are able to collect groundwater; however, if they are at or near the surface, salted dry land may form as the water evaporates. The quality of the groundwater over the pitches can be good, so that drinkable water occurs, or it can be very saline and thus not potable. The lower groundwater resources in the Wianamatta Group rocks are generally less saline than the near-surface occurrences.

Willan (1925) presented structure contours at 30 metres (98 ft) intervals on both the base of the Group and the Upper Coal Measures summit. These contour maps are broadly similar and reveal a series of structural domes and basins, which included the Fairfield Basin, Penrith Basin, Botany Basin, and the Mulgoa Dome. Numerous minor faults and warps occur within the Ashfield Shale and other formations of the Group. These include the Homebush Bay Fault Zone, a major north-northeast-trending fault system that extends for at least 20 kilometres (12 mi) through parts of western and northern Sydney.In addition, sporadic significant depositions with shattered zones up to approximately 6 metres (20 ft) wide have been exposed. The most significant morphological quality affecting the Wianamatta Formation is the Glenbrook Monocline, together with associated tectonic features along the western margin of the Cumberland Basin. This structure and its physiographic significance were examined in detail by Osborne (1948) and are not repeated here. Both the Bringelly Shale and Minchinbury Sandstone are considered a single lithotope, consisting predominantly of shale with subordinate calcareous graywacke-type sandstone beds and lenses.

Further structural investigations have been undertaken in the Greater Western Sydney area using data from a series of exploratory boreholes exercised by Sydney Water. These boreholes, together with structure contours at 6 metres (20 ft) intervals on the Ashfield Shale's base, reveal an irregular basin profile. Compared with earlier mapping, the increased data density and finer contour interval indicate a more complex and tightly folded structure, with pronounced local highs and lows over relatively short distances. Structurally, the western margin of the area is defined by the shallow basin-like Bankstown Low. Eastward, the structure becomes progressively tighter, with prominent highs at Annandale and around the Sydney University, separated by the low at Erskineville. The eastern edge is marked by another domal feature, the Kensington High. These data demonstrate a greater degree of tectonic complexity than had previously been recognized in the Sydney Basin. The jointing pattern within the Wianamatta Group reflects this tectonic history. Two dominant subvertical joint sets, striking approximately N30°W and N55°E, have been identified. This joint pattern predates Tertiary igneous activity, as basic dykes intruded along these joint orientations.

While Ashfield and Bringelly Shales share very low porosity and comparable unconfined strengths, they differ markedly in most other characteristics. Bringelly Shale contains mixed-layer clay minerals, making it more prone to swelling and other physico-chemical changes than Ashfield Shale. It also has a lower siderite content, whereas siderite in Ashfield Shale provides effective natural cementation. Any weak cementation in Bringelly Shale is difficult to confirm in laboratory tests. This fragility often results in poor core recovery, especially when water-based drilling fluids are used, as the shale can swell and crumble once confining stress is relieved. Exposed to the atmosphere, Bringelly Shale deteriorates far more quickly than Ashfield Shale.

When fresh, the shale and claystone of the Wianamatta Group are generally dark grey to black, but weathering can substantially alter their appearance. Weathered exposures commonly display lighter grey, olive, brown, yellow-brown, orange and reddish-brown colours, with rusty iron oxide staining locally conspicuous. The colour varies according to lithology, degree of weathering and drainage conditions; oxidation of iron-bearing minerals contributes to the brown, orange and red coloration of strongly weathered material. The Ashfield Shale, for example, is typically black when fresh but becomes considerably lighter when weathered.

=== Stratigraphy ===
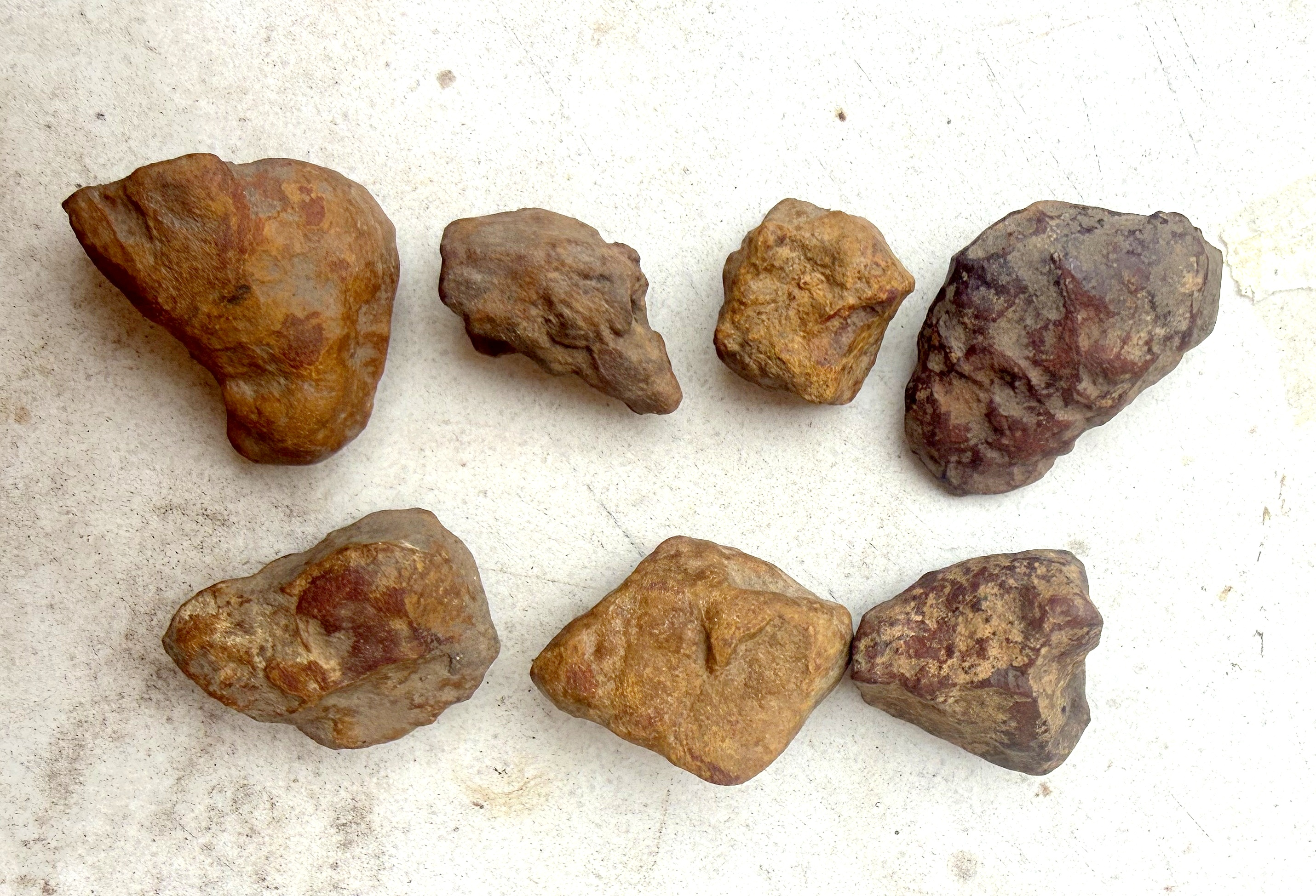
Rock fragments within the stratigraphy include ferruginised mudstone and siltstone, iron-stained sandstone lenses, silicified shale, and ironstone concretions formed through groundwater alteration and surface weathering.

The Wianamatta Group has traditionally been subdivided into three informal stages. The Lower Stage consists of approximately 60 metres (200 ft) of carbonaceous and ferruginous shales, occasionally sandy near the base, with some defiled coal junctures up to 1.2 metres (3.9 ft) thick, minor argillaceous limestone, and lens-shaped beds of acidic tuff. The Middle Stage is roughly 60.9 metres (200 ft) thick and comprises thin-bedded, sometimes ripple-marked sandstones, lenticular calcareous and tuffaceous sandstones, and interstratified sutures of minor coal up to 0.9 metres (3.0 ft) thick. The Upper Stage is 60–90 metres (200–300 ft) thick and consists of thick-bedded, splitting belts of medium to rough sandstone with some volcaniclastic material, mud breccia, shales, and plant remains. David Branagan (1950) proposed a two-fold lithologic partition of the Wianamatta Series, although a map was not released and stage descriptions were brief. F.N. Hanlon (1952) formally determined the Wianamatta as its own type, noting that while the Group consists mainly of sandstone and shale, neither rock type is dominant. Within this framework, a significant mineralogical separation into two subgroups is recognized, which in turn can be subdivided into eight well-defined formations.

The Wianamatta Group features significant outcrops across approximately ten layers of the military charting system, including Port Hacking, Liverpool, Camden, Broken Bay, Windsor and Sydney CBD, in addition to Wollongong, Moss Vale, Mittagong, and Kiama to the south. The border between the Wianamatta Formation and the Sydney Sandstone below is defined at the summit of the highest sandstone band within the transitional zone. Beds in this zone, often referred to as passage beds, are considered part of the Hawkesbury Sandstone rather than the Wianamatta Group. This boundary has genetic significance: The Ashfield Shale, as defined, is a lithologically identical shale formation. The dark shales of the passage beds allow comparison with shale lenses in the Sydney Sandstone, whereas comparable sandstones are absent in the true Wianamatta sequence. This definition ensures a clear lithologic distinction between the two groups. Outcrops of solitary remains of the basal formation, Ashfield Shale, at the edges of four encircling layers (Wallerawang, Katoomba, St. Albans, and Burragorang) suggest that the Group originally covered a much larger area, possibly extending at least 145 kilometres (90 mi) north to south and 65 kilometres (40 mi) east to west, matching the sedimentation of the Sydney Basin in the Permo-Triassic period. Tertiary igneous intrusions are indicated only where directly associated with the Wianamatta Group.

Francis J. Pettijohn (1949) summarized the literature and defined graywacke as a petrographically distinct sandstone characterized by its callosity and dark hue, composed of large, angular detrital grains—mainly quartz, feldspar, and rock pieces (chert, phyllite, and slate)—set in a prominent clay matrix, which under low-grade metamorphism converts to chlorite and sericite and may be partly supplanted by carbonate. A detailed classification based on the mineralogical constitution of the detrital fraction, provides a framework for relating various members of the Wianamatta sandstone group. While useful, this approach requires precise determination of the quartz, clay, and feldspar content. Further subdivision of the graywacke field is also needed to move beyond arbitrary distinctions. Many sandstones previously reported as tuffaceous sandstones are now recognized as graywacke types. The typical Wianamatta sandstone sits inside the graywacke area, with affinities to subgraywacke. However, the graywacke area is broad, and precise lithologic definition requires more comprehensive study. A potential approach for subdivision could be based on the mineralogic composition of three graywacke types associated with different tectonic settings, including an unstable shelf.

=== Depositional environment ===
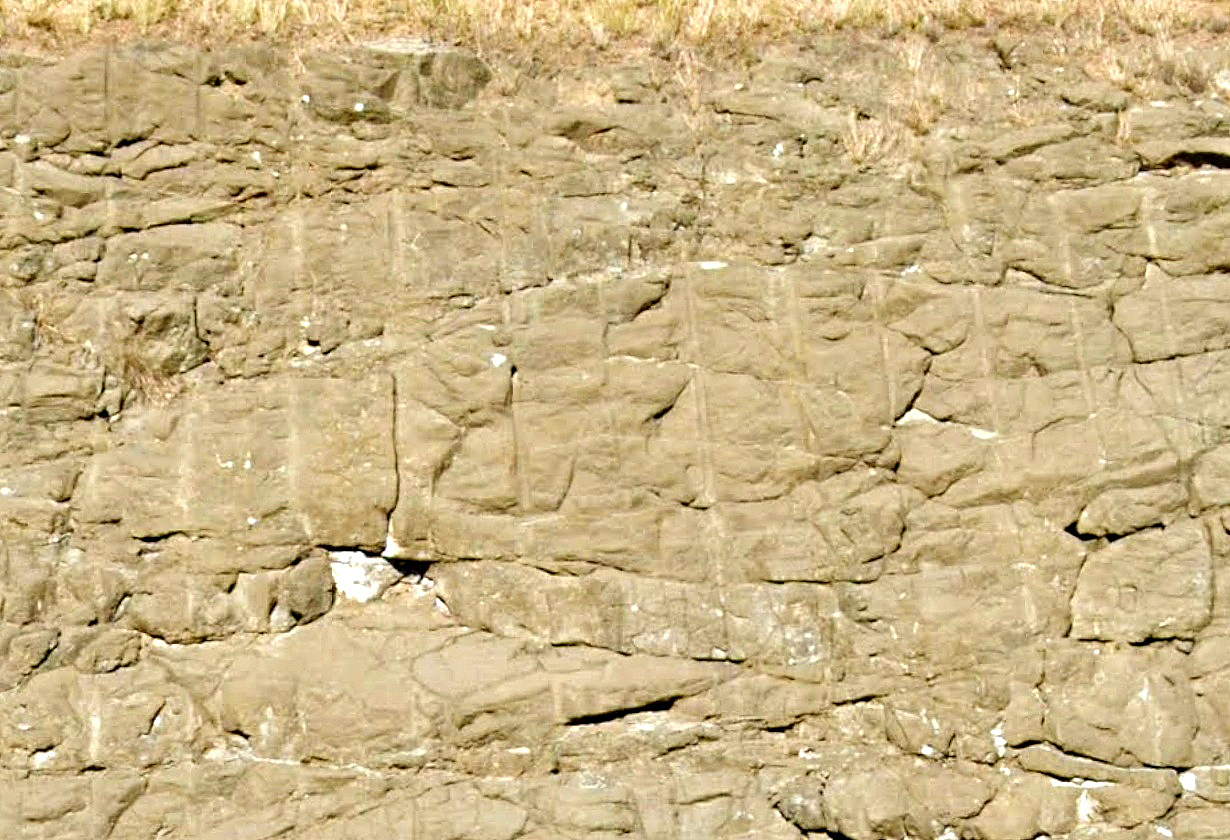
Exposed Bringelly Shale unit at Pemulwuy

The transition to deposition of the Wianamatta Group occurred through channel beds of interchanging Hawkesbury and Ashfield type of sandstone and shale, respectively, likely reflecting an extension of the environmental conditions responsible for the dark shales within the Hawkesbury Sandstone. These passage beds occur in most mapped sheets, particularly the Camden Sheet and different southern sheets. In other areas, the transition is more pronounced, with the Ashfield Shale resting on contemporaneously eroded surfaces of the Hawkesbury Sandstone. Tectonically, the shelf area remained stable with minimal subsidence. However, the geographical environment changed significantly. Conditions for the formation of humic black shales with typical sideritic mudstone bands suggest widespread, lagoonal, humid conditions with restricted circulation. The preservation of abundant carbonaceous material is attributed to rapid deposition of fine sediments, implying growing instability in the root area. The depositional environment likely fluctuated between freshwater and marine conditions, gradually stabilizing toward marine conditions. Evidence for a marine influence includes the observation that the freshwater fauna of the Ashfield Shale—comprising molluscs, fish, and other organisms—is restricted to an area below 30 metres (98 ft) over the Hawkesbury Sandstone. The fauna often occurs in vertically restricted zones, suggesting catastrophic events, potentially caused by an influx of saltwater.

The appearance of graywacke sort of sandstones marks the first clear indication of changing tectonic conditions, reflecting increasing instability of the shelf area. Locally occurring quartz-rich sandstones suggest deposition in relatively high-energy environments, such as channels or shorelines, where turbulent conditions promoted the removal of finer material and the concentration of quartz-rich sediment. In some sandstones, the abundance of calcite cement results in compositions approaching argillaceous limestone. This feature is characteristic of depositional settings associated with tectonic instability and estuarine environments, where clastic and non-clastic sediments are freely mixed. The conditions prevailing during deposition of the Camden Subgroup represent a continuation and consolidation of those established during the depositional phase of the Bringelly Shale and Minchinbury Sandstone. Overall, the depositional environment remained estuarine and transitional, with a progressive tendency toward shallow, open-circulation marine conditions. The shelf area became increasingly unstable, and oscillatory movements leading to fluctuations of the shoreline produced the complex alternation of large graywacke-variety sandstone and shale formations characteristic of the Camden Subgroup.

=== Mineralogy ===
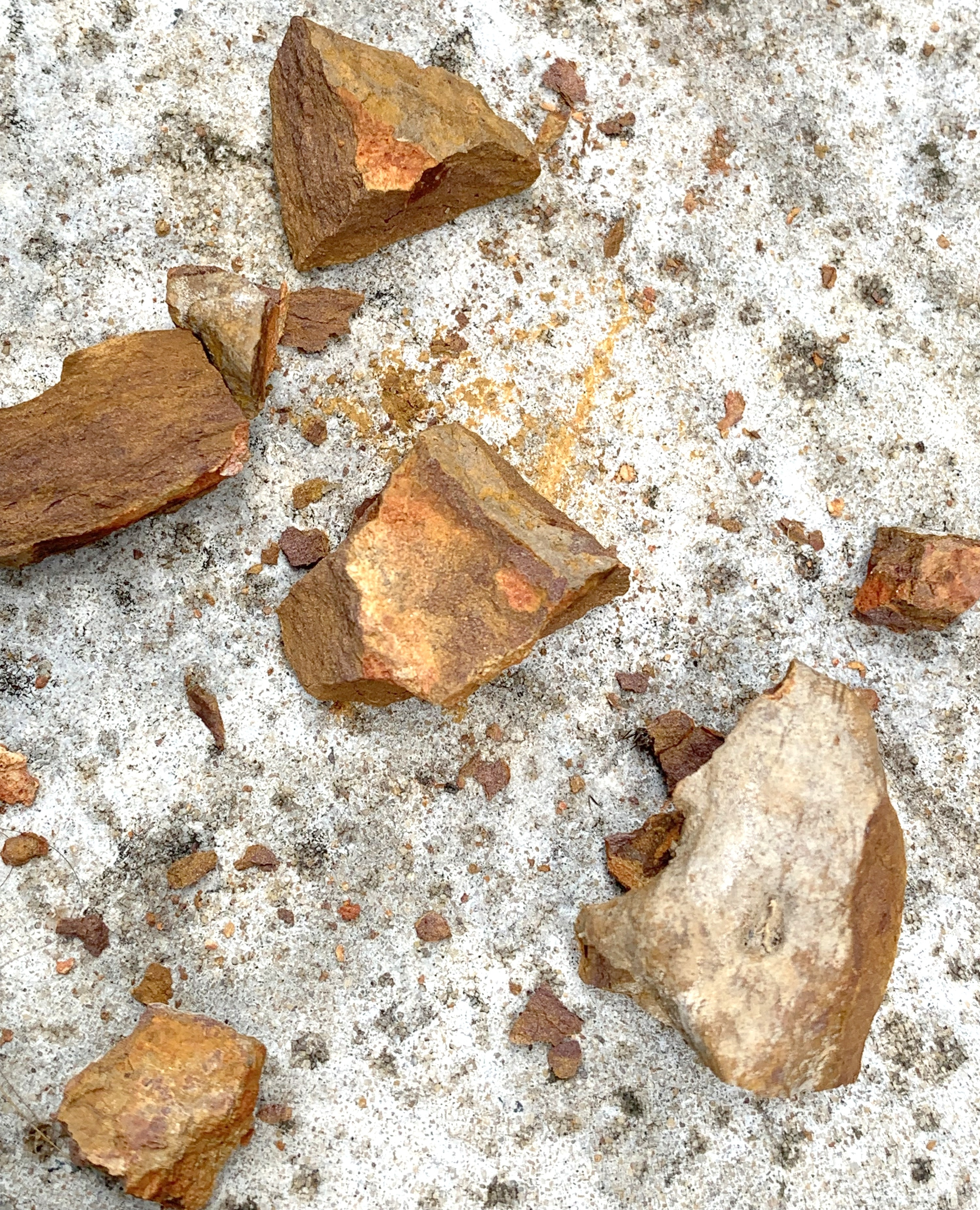
Crumbled, iron-cemented, shaley sandstone found in Smithfield

Low-lying areas where groundwater is close to the surface are also susceptible to dryland salinity. Groundwater quality can range from fresh to highly saline, with the deeper groundwater generally less saline. The sandstones of the Wianamatta Group are generally lithologically consistent, with few exceptions. They differ noticeably from the Hawkesbury Sandstone's orthoquartzites, even in hand specimens. The sandstones range in color from greenish to buff, with poor to medium sorting. Grain sizes typically range from 0.01 metres (0.39 in) to 0.2 millimetres (0.0079 in), with intermittent grains up to 0.03 millimetres (0.0012 in). Most grains and pieces are angled and lack preferred predilection. The structure of the clastic mineral fragment is relatively uniform across the sandstones. The sandstones of the Wianamatta Group occupy an important position among common sedimentary lithologies. Various terms have been applied to these rocks in the literature, including orthoquartzite, pure quartz sandstone, feldspathic sandstone, subgraywacke arkose and graywacke. Of these, graywacke has been most inconsistently used, resulting in a confusing range of definitions.

Clay mineral contents ranged from 40% to 65% in the claystone–siltstone materials of the Ashfield and Bringelly shales, with a general trend toward higher clay contents in the Bringelly Shale. The Ashfield Shale had a typical clay mineral component of 43%, in comparison with 51.5% for the Bringelly Shale. In both shales, quartz is the dominant non-clay mineral; however, Ashfield Shale contains significant amounts of siderite, whereas feldspar is more abundant in the Bringelly Shale. Organic carbon content has been assessed for the Bringelly Shale, since organic matter is thought to contribute to cementation, but has not been determined for the Ashfield Shale, where organic matter seems to be insignificant. A notable distinction among the two shales is the relative abundance of siderite. When exposed to atmospheric conditions, Bringelly Shale degrades more rapidly than Ashfield Shale.

The lateral distribution of salt is most effectively illustrated by constructing a series of isohels. Salt concentrations increase toward the middle bloc of the Greater Sydney area, where the Wianamatta Group reaches its greatest thickness and extends furthest below sea level. The salt is interpreted as inherent in origin, meaning it originated from the sea waters present during deposition and subsequently retained within the shales under specific conditions: the shales' low permeability facilitated retention, and the basin's low relief and limited natural drainage promoted the concentration of salts. The occurrence of both magnesium and sodium salts, coupled with an alkaline pH—features characteristic of modern seawater—supports this interpretation. In contrast, the acid, non-saline waters associated with the overlying Hawkesbury Sandstone are consistent with a freshwater origin for that formation.

==== Composition ====
Minerals generally present in the Formation include:

- Glauconite: Olive-green to yellow-green pellets of glauconite are scattered throughout the formations, often replacing organic remains such as ostracods.
- Chlorite and sericite: Fine flakes of chlorite and sericite are also present.
- Rock fragments: Sub-angular fragments of shale and other rock types constitute 5–20 % of the rock.
- Iron oxide: Hematite grains are common, with exceptional concentrations up to 10 % observed in some Minchinbury Sandstone samples.
- Matrix and cement: The matrix generally constitutes 25–60 % of the rock and may include combinations of clay and calcite. Clay content ranges from 10–50 %, while calcite, always interstitial and likely authigenic, ranges from 25–60 % in some samples. Minor cracks and splices are commonly filled with calcite crystals.
- Chlorite: In addition to its allogenic origin, some chlorite appears as an authigenic mineral at the base of grains, commonly forming rims around quartz grains and occasionally replacing them.
- Quartz: Angular, poorly sorted grains make up 10–20 % of the rock, with an average of 15 %. An exceptional quartz-rich type out of the Potts Hill Sandstone contains up to 50 % quartz, but this occurrence is unique. Secondary micro-mosaics of quartz are occasionally present in the matrix.
- Feldspar: Plagioclase and potassium feldspars occur, with plagioclase dominant. Plagioclase is typically sodic (oligoclase), while potassium feldspars are usually kaolinized, though comparatively fresh microcline has been observed in the Minchinbury Sandstone. Feldspar content ranges from 15–30 %, averaging around 20 %, but calcite-rich types may contain little or no feldspar due to replacement or incorporation by calcite.
- Siderite: Siderite grains and ooid-shaped aggregates are abundant, particularly in the Minchinbury Sandstone.

== Soils ==
Weathering of Wianamatta Group rocks has produced extensive clay-rich soils across much of the Cumberland Plain, particularly the Cumberland Lowlands. Much of this area is occupied by the Blacktown soil landscape, a residual soil landscape formed in situ from Wianamatta Group rocks. It is characterised by broad, rounded crests and gently inclined slopes, with red and brown podzolic soils occurring mainly on crests and upper slopes and deeper yellow podzolic soils on lower slopes and near drainage lines.

The soils typically display a strong texture contrast. A loamy or clay-loam A horizon, which may extend to approximately 30 centimetres (12 in), commonly overlies a hardsetting clay-loam or silty clay-loam A2 horizon, followed by an abrupt transition to a strongly structured clay-rich B horizon. The subsoil generally consists of brown light to medium clay that becomes heavier and increasingly mottled with depth, commonly grading into grey, highly plastic clay immediately above weathered shale bedrock. Profiles are generally less than 1 metre (3.3 ft) deep on ridges and crests but may exceed 2 metres (6.6 ft) on lower slopes. Under the Australian Soil Classification, soils developed on Wianamatta Group shale include Kurosols and Sodosols. Investigations in the Bankstown area, for example, identified moderately deep Brown Kurosols over Wianamatta Group shale, characterised by thin sandy-loam surface soils and pale, hardsetting A2 horizons sharply overlying brown medium-clay subsoils. These clay-rich subsoils are commonly acidic and slowly permeable, with imperfect drainage and seasonal waterlogging occurring in some lower-lying areas.

Soil investigations in the eastern and south-eastern parts of the Cumberland Plain demonstrate considerable local variation in soil type. In the Bankstown area, soils developed over Wianamatta Group shale include Kurosols and Sodosols, while adjacent areas over Hawkesbury Sandstone are characterised by shallow, sandy Tenosols. In East Hills, at Smith Park, on gently undulating terrain underlain by Wianamatta Group shale, the soils were classified as moderately deep, imperfectly drained Brown Kurosols (formerly classified as Yellow Podzolic Soils). A typical profile consisted of a very shallow sandy-loam A1 horizon, less than 3 centimetres (1.2 in) thick, over a pale, hardsetting A2 horizon extending to approximately 14 centimetres (5.5 in), followed by an abrupt transition to brown medium clay. The pale A2 horizon indicates imperfect drainage and lateral movement of water above the comparatively impermeable clay-rich B horizon. At East Bankstown Airport, the relatively undisturbed soils of the central drainage plain were identified predominantly as Natric Brown and Yellow Kurosols, corresponding to soils formerly classified as Soloths. These have a 8-to-12-centimetre (3.1 to 4.7 in) loamy A1 horizon over a 12-to-26-centimetre (4.7 to 10.2 in) hardsetting and frequently bleached silty clay-loam A2 horizon. Beneath this lies a yellowish-brown medium-clay B horizon extending beyond 1 metre (3.3 ft), with extensive mottling indicative of poor drainage. The B horizon becomes progressively redder upslope, where drainage conditions improve.

Similar texture-contrast soils occur at Voyager Point, where the investigation recorded deep, laterised Brown Kurosols, formerly classified as Brown and Yellow Podzolic Soils. These consist of a thin fine sandy clay-loam surface horizon over brown light-medium clay, with a deeper lateritic layer containing pisolitic ironstone gravel. Other parts of Voyager Point support deep Brown Kandosols on more recent alluvial deposits. The distribution of these soils reflects differences in parent material, topography and drainage. Kurosols developed on shale and older alluvial surfaces commonly exhibit a pronounced texture contrast between relatively thin, lighter-textured surface horizons and dense clay-rich subsoils. Poorly drained examples may possess bleached surface horizons and strongly mottled clay subsoils, while better-drained positions tend to develop redder subsoil colours. By contrast, areas developed over Hawkesbury Sandstone at East Hills and Lambeth Reserve in Picnic Point contain shallow, rapidly drained sandy Tenosols with comparatively little capacity to retain moisture.

== See also ==
- Narrabeen group
- Mittagong formation
- Illawarra Coal Measures
- Newcastle Coal Measures
