= Minchinbury Sandstone =

Triassic age unit of sedimentary rock in Australia

- Stratigraphic range: Middle Triassic
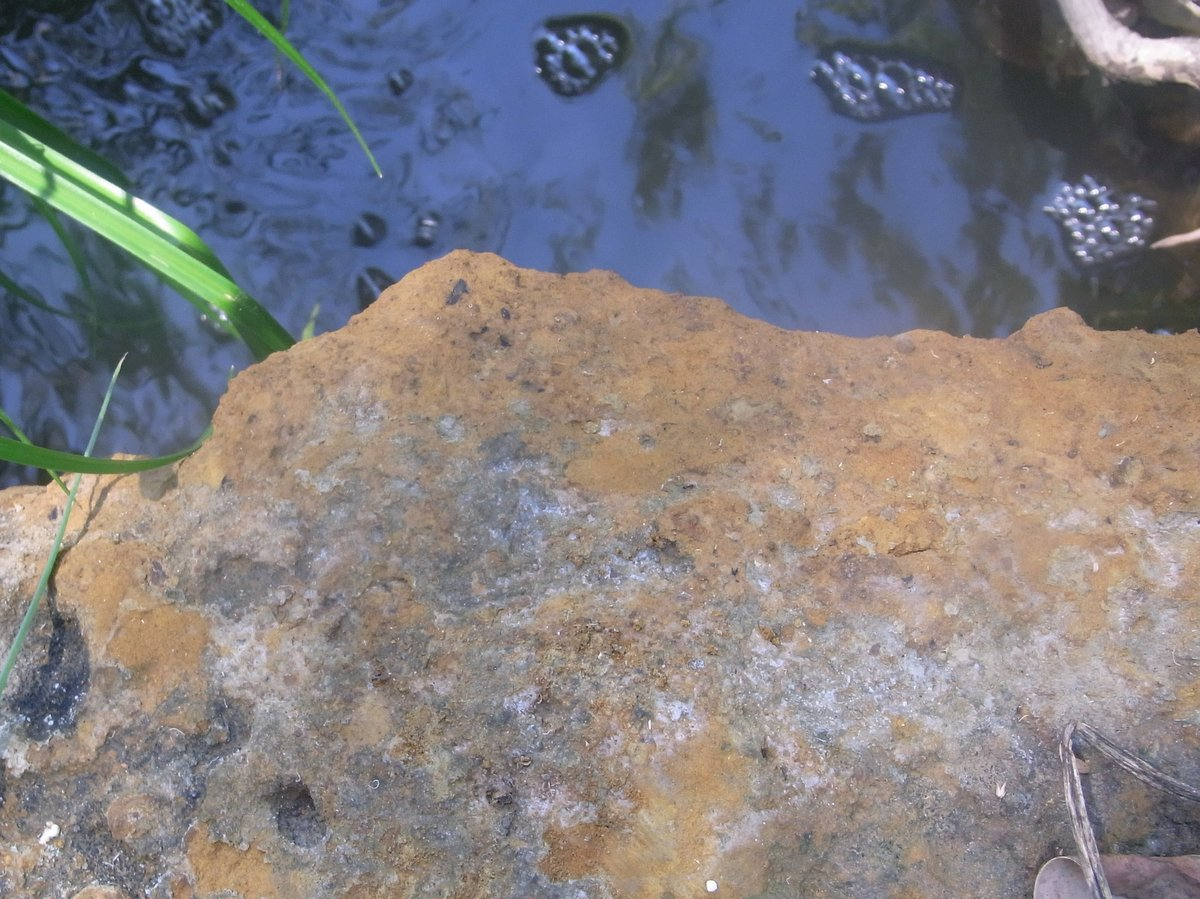
- Exposed sandstone beside the Duck River, in South Granville
- Type: Geological formation
- Unit of: Wiannamatta group
- Underlies: Bringelly Shale
- Overlies: Hawkesbury sandstone
- Thickness: up to 6 metres (20 ft)

Lithology
- Primary: Sandstone
- Other: Shale

Location
- Location: Sydney, Australia
- Region: Western Sydney, south-western Sydney
- Country: Australia

Type section
- Named for: Minchinbury

Minchinbury Sandstone is a component of the Wianammatta Group of sedimentary rocks in the Sydney Basin of eastern Australia that was formed in the middle Triassic period. The sandstone was structured by marine deposition as a set of sandy barrier islands at a coastal shoreline.

== Description ==
Thickness is between 1.5 metres (4.9 ft) and 6 metres (20 ft) , usually less than 3 metres (9.8 ft) . It comprises up to 70% quartz with calcite and volcanic lithic fragments. There is less feldspar and more calcite than the adjacent Bringelly Shale. Related to Greywacke, it comprises fine to medium-grained lithic sandstone. The sandstone is a shoreline facies containing a beach and barrier bar complex.

The Bringelly Shale lies above the Minchinbury Sandstone. Fossils are rare in this stratum, though plant fragments have been recorded.

== Location ==
The type locality of the formation is near the Great Western Highway in the suburb of Minchinbury in western Sydney. It is most often seen in the western parts of the city. Outcroppings are weak and not easily found, but it may be seen in places like road cuttings in localities from Epping, Grose Vale-Kurrajong, Kellyville, Rogans Hill, Bankstown, Pendle Hill, Bonnyrigg, Menangle, Duck River, Brownlow Hill and other sites.

At Minchinbury, the sandstone is more than 100 metres (330 ft) deep in a downhole, and its natural outcrops are particularly elusive to find elsewhere. In Lansdowne, there are large, albeit disconnected sandstone slabs, with other smaller outcrops and floaters dispersed near a slope.

== See also ==
- Hawkesbury sandstone
- Bringelly Shale
- Ashfield Shale
