= Bringelly Shale =

Triassic age unit of sedimentary rock in Australia

- Stratigraphic range: Middle Triassic
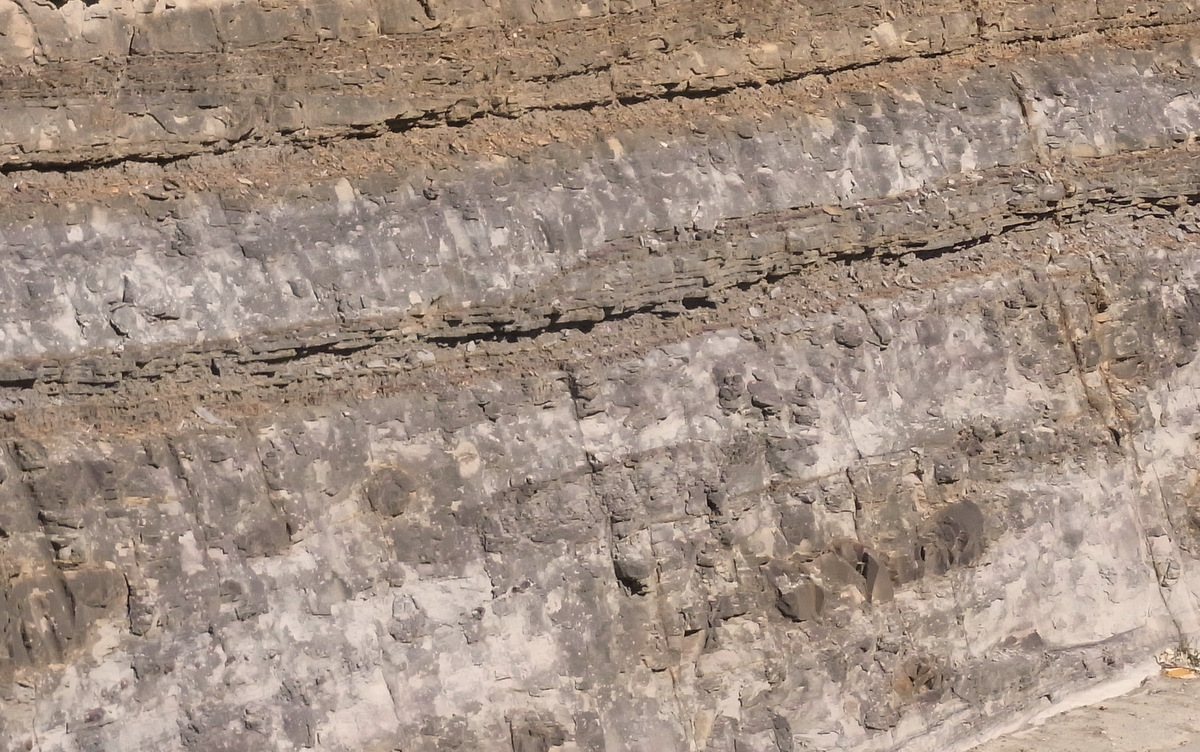
- Exposed Bringelly Shale at Greystanes, Australia (Prospect Hill)
- Type: Geological formation
- Unit of: Wiannamatta group
- Underlies: Ashfield Shale
- Overlies: Hawkesbury sandstone, Minchinbury Sandstone
- Thickness: up to 60 metres (200 ft)

Lithology
- Primary: Shale
- Other: Sandstone

Location
- Location: Western Sydney
- Region: LGAs of Liverpool, Penrith and Fairfield
- Country: Australia

Type section
- Named for: Bringelly

Bringelly Shale is a component of the Wianamatta group of sedimentary rocks in the Sydney Basin of eastern Australia. Formed in the Middle Triassic Period, it has an extensive outcrop in the western parts of Sydney and occupies around one third of the Sydney sheet.

Occupying much of the Cumberland Plain, the shale has its greatest geographical extent at Bringelly (its namesake), near the suburb of Liverpool. Featuring sandstone lentils, it is the topmost layer of the Wianamatta Group and the youngest Triassic sedimentary rock unit in the Sydney Basin.

== Lithology ==
The shale is the topmost layer of sedimentary rock laid down by a coastal alluvial river delta over the older Hawkesbury sandstone in the Triassic Period. It transitions from an inlet or coastal swamp sheet at the bottom in a marshy plain deposited on the delta, to a more alluvial plain sediment at the top of the unit. It roamed through the rivers of Sydney, and accumulated sand at numerous locations, which it then solidified into sandstone.

It is similar to Ashfield Shale in that both have low porosities, though differing in having a greater amount of calcareous, graywacke-type, lithic sandstone bands and lenses, carbonaceous claystone, siltstone, laminite, but would lack sideritic mudstone bands that Ashfield Shale has. Featuring lumpy clay minerals, it swells and decays rapidly on submergence in water and is generally less durable.

== Description ==
Exposed sediments on Prospect Highway, Pemulwuy.

The average thickness is around 60 metres (200 ft), though a maximum thickness of 257 metres (843 ft) was recorded at Razorback, near Campbelltown. It was deposited in a swampy alluvial plain with winding streams that formed sporadic beds of sandstone. The shale is dark when unweathered just like the Ashfield Shale, and is usually a typical olive-green colour when weathered. Alloyed coal bands and lenses and iron oxide concretions have been observed in the shale. The shale is quarried in many western suburbs of Sydney for brick and miscellaneous ceramic manufacture.

Unlike the Ashfield Shale, it features sandstone lithology and lenticles that fluctuate from 2.5 centimetres (0.98 in) to 150 centimetres (59 in) in thickness, in addition to having a disposition for the thicker lens bands that are concentrated at the top of the rock. The sandstones within the shale are filled sediments in channels that were created by rivers, which wind across the marshy lowlands.

=== Distribution ===
The disjointed sandstone lenses become thicker and more conspicuous from Western Sydney Regional Park and to the south of it, whereby shaping the hilly landscape between Campbelltown and Picton. Namely found on Old Hume Highway, approaching Picton, the sandstone cliffs that become thicker are roughly around 200 metres (660 ft) in height. The steep banks of the sandstone lentils influence the flora of the Cumberland Plain Woodland, with such escarpments being observed in Western Sydney Dry Rainforest areas. The shale runs into the Potts Hill Sandstone through a minor transitional zone of vacillating sandstone and shale bands.

== See also ==
- Hawkesbury sandstone
- Ashfield Shale
- Wianamatta shale
- Narrabeen Group
- Prospect dolerite intrusion
