= Prospect dolerite intrusion =

Landform of Sydney

- Stratigraphic range: Early Jurassic or Middle Jurassic
- Dolerite intrusion overlying Ashfield Shale and the Hawkesbury sandstone
- Type: igneous
- Overlies: Ashfield Shale and Sydney sandstone
- Area: 2.4 km by 1.4 km
- Thickness: 76.2 metres (250 ft)

Lithology
- Primary: picrite, dolerite, prehnite, basalt, calcite, pegmatite, etc

Location
- Coordinates: 33°49′30″S 150°55′5″E
- Region: Western Sydney, New South Wales
- Country: Australia
- Extent: City of Blacktown and Cumberland City Council

Type section
- Named for: Prospect, New South Wales
- Named by: Governor Arthur Phillip and Lieutenant (later Governor) Philip Gidley King

The Prospect dolerite intrusion, or Prospect intrusion, is a Jurassic picrite or dolerite laccolith that is situated in Sydney, New South Wales, Australia. Lying in the heart of Cumberland Plain, in the suburb of Pemulwuy (previously Greystanes), the igneous intrusion is Sydney's largest body of igneous rock, rising to a height of 117 metres (384 ft) above sea level. The site is formed by an intrusion of dolerite rock into Ashfield Shale and the Hawkesbury sandstone. At least seven different rock types occur in the intrusion.

The site was formed from around 200 million years ago when volcanic material (hot magmatic fluids) from the Earth's upper mantle moved upwards and then sideways, which produced many different minerals in the upper part. Formerly known as Prospect Quarry, the eroded residue of the volcanic core became a quarry of the basalt plug that was carried out from 1820s until the late 2000s, where it contributed most of the crushed rock that were used for building construction and roads in the Sydney area. The intrusion comprises: prospect dolerite and prospect teschenite, in addition to an abundance of coarse grained picrite, olivine and its prehnite specimens.

== Igneous activity ==
=== Formation ===
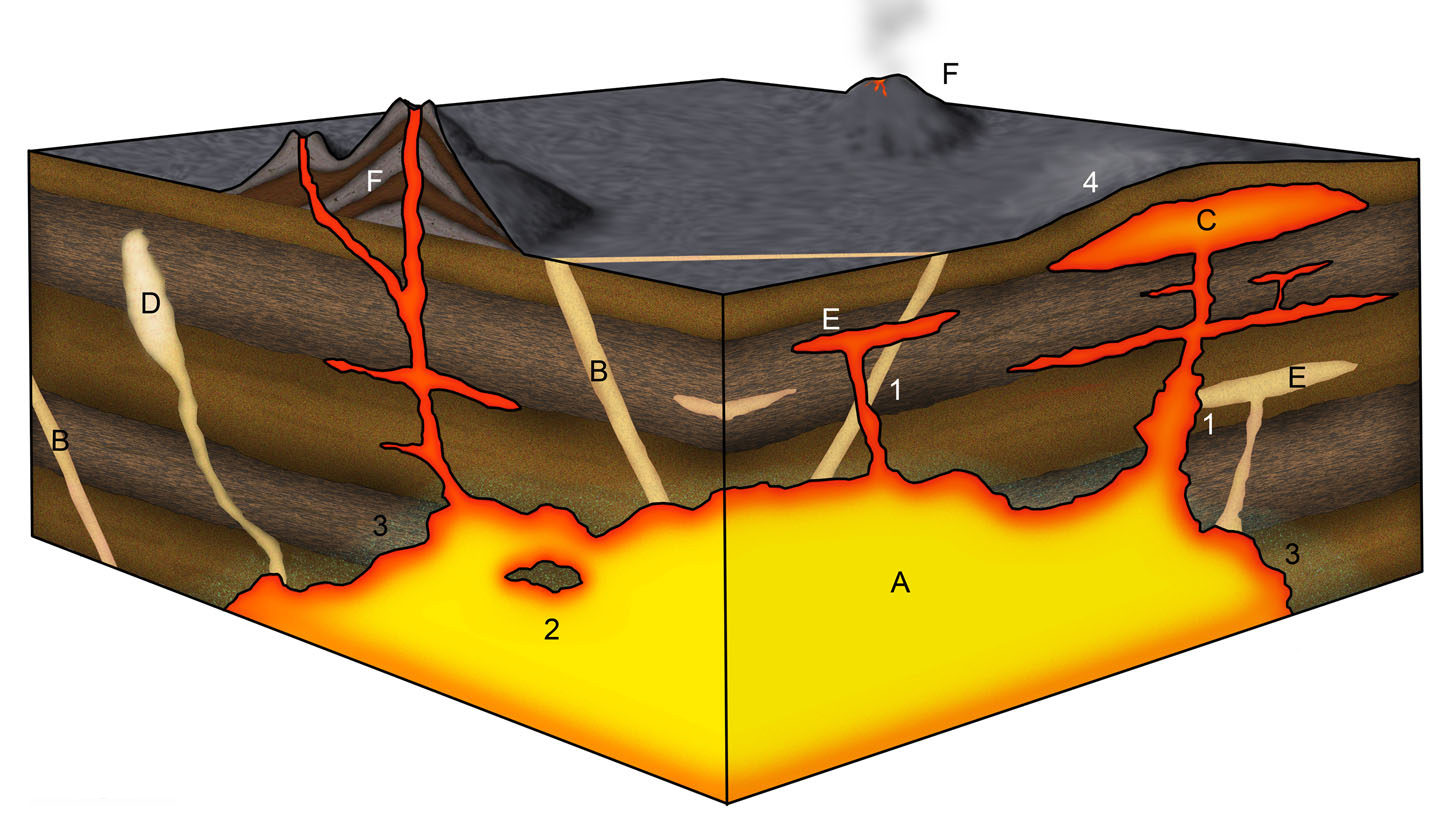
Diagram of igneous structures (laccolith is C on top-right).

In the Sydney Basin, igneous activity took place in the Early Jurassic activity that resulted in the shaping of the Prospect dolerite intrusion – This unambiguously points that the site had a volcanic origin. The eroded residue of the volcanic core forms the site, which was battered down over millions of years to a small extrusion in the relatively flat lands of western Sydney.

Consequent to the volcanic activity, which determined the shape of the Prospect dolerite intrusion many million years ago, erosion then undermined the main mass of volcanic material and caused it to fall in on itself and create a shallow, dish-shaped formation with shrinkage cracks that established in the intrusion, as shown by the salient cooled edges of basalt formed by high heat difference between the comparatively cool (and likely wet) sediments and the magma.

This allowed hot magmatic fluids, which are around 900–1,000 °C (1,620–1,800 °F), to relocate via developing pegmatite and depositing prehnite, calcite and other subsidiary minerals that are found in the upper part of the intrusion, with analcime dolerite (teschenite) and picrite shaping the bulk of the intrusion site.

=== Erosion ===
At the next stage of its geological development, which lasted over 60 million years, was the gradual erosion of the overlying layers of sedimentary rock by the motion of rainwater, which ultimately revealed the edges of the volcanic and metamorphic rocks of the Prospect intrusion. The intrusion has been an inadvertent outcome of tense continental crust breaking all the way down to the upper mantle during development of the rift divergence zone that occurred before the breakup of the Australian and Antarctic continents in the Eocene epoch.

The fractures acted as pathway for basaltic magma from the mantle area and a few of these would have been feeder dikes for the intrusion, whereby the magma ascended to an area of density equilibrium inside the surface rocks. The site's heat transformed the nature of the encompassing rock to produce many type of minerals, which were mainly coarse-grained picrite, alongside olivine-dolerite. The picrite did not extend to the surface, though it thrusted the surface rocks upwards to create a dome.

== Geological description ==
Exposed shale from Prospect Highway

The Prospect Intrusion is one of many Mesozoic intrusions that were dispositioned into the Sydney Basin depositional area at the conjunction of the Triassic fluvial Sydney sandstone and the lacustrine Ashfield Shale which underlies the intrusion. The quarry site is one the several Mesozoic intrusions positioned into the Sydney Basin sequence at the intersection of the Triassic fluvial Sydney sandstone and overlying shallow-marine Ashfield Shale. H.G. Wilshire described the Prospect quarry site as "an annular teschenite intrusion which has invaded the Triassic Wianamatta shale. The outer oval shaped part of the intrusion has discordant contacts and rises about 75 feet above the central part which is occupied by a sill approximately 250 feet thick and which is overlain by 20 to 70 feet of shale".

The site is 60 metres (197 ft) above ground level and 122 metres (400 ft) above sea level, and is 2.4 kilometres (1 mi) long and 1.4 kilometres (1 mi). The dolerite intrusion is a circular teschenite encroachment that has intruded the Triassic Wianamatta shale, with the intrusion's external, elliptic shaped portion featuring dissentious impinging. The intrusion site has a sill that is roughly 76.2 metres (250 ft) thick and is covered by 6.09 metres (20 ft) to 21.3 metres (70 ft) of shale.

The dome is called a doleritic laccolith. A regular laccolith's intruded material features a rather flat lower surface and a bell-shaped upper surface, where it is more like half a lens in shape. Though because of the descent of the volcanic material, combined with consequent surface erosion, the laccolith maintained a concave upper surface until present, due to quarrying altering its shape, owing to its description as "caldera-like". The intrusion has been stratified, but that depends on how its parts distinguished when it cooled down.

=== Minerals ===
The quarried hill today, with dolerite intrusion on sandstone and shale.

The hill contains a slender, chilled margin of fine-grained basalt with most of the mass of the intrusion being made up of picrite, dolerite, and high level intrusives. The picrite is a farinaceous-grained rock dominated by olivine and is made up of two-thirds of the lower constituent of the intrusion, with the upper third of dolerite also containing other mafic minerals. The shales above and below the intrusion had very reduced levels of metamorphism and exhibited superficial modification to a fine quartz hornfels with nearly no growth in grain size.

The copious amount of analcime in the rocks at the intrusion's top shows significant reservation of magmatic water during crystallization. If venting of the hydrothermal fluids into the encompassing sediments had happened, the diverse range of unique rock types and related late-stage minerals wouldn't have formed. Volcaniclastic sediments were rare and volcanic rocks on the site are predominantly mafic. In the 1960s, a small amount of gold was observed in a sample test, but since then no more has been discovered.

The site also has had a sweeping collection of other minerals, such as:

- Albite-anorthite series
- Analcime
- Apatite
- Apophyllite (KF)
- Aragonite
- Augite
- Basanite
- Baryte
- Biotite
- Chabazite-Ca
- Calcite
- Chalcedony
- Chlorite Group
- Feldspar group
- Gold
- Halotrichite
- Heulandite
- Ilmenite
- Laumontite
- Leucite
- Marcasite
- Montmorillonite
- Natrolite
- Nephelinite
- Olivine
- Opal
- Pectolite
- Phillipsite
- Pickeringite
- Plagioclase
- Pyrite
- Pyroxene
- Rhombohedra
- Quartz
- Rhyolite
- Siderite
- Smectite group
- Syenite
- Trachybasalt
- Trachyandesite
- Trachyte
- Tuff

== History ==
=== Discovery, 1788–91 ===
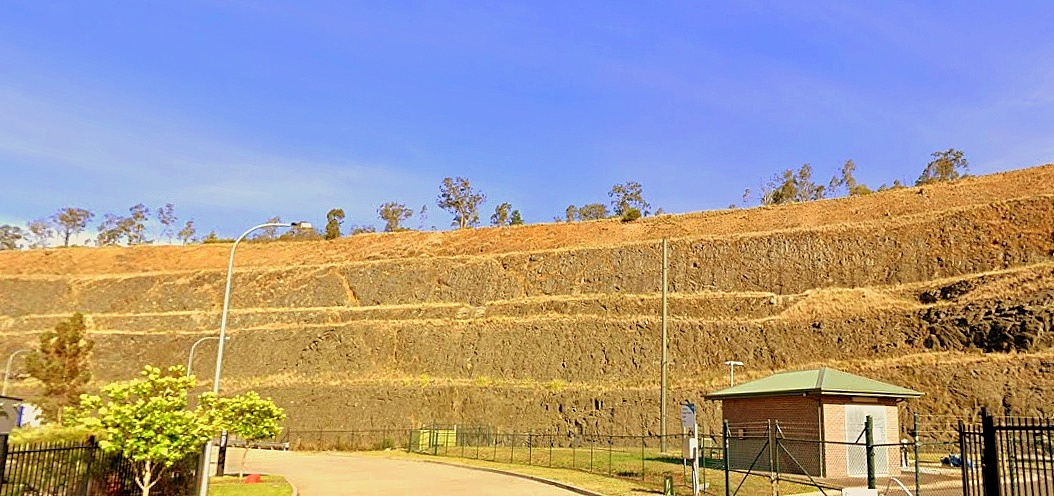
View of the rock stratum

The area of Prospect Reservoir is an area of known Aboriginal occupation, with favorable camping locations along the Eastern Creek and Prospect Creek catchments, and in elevated landscapes to the south. The area was settled by Europeans by 1789. On 26 April 1788, an exploration party heading west led by Governor Phillip, climbed the site, which was known as Prospect Hill or "Bellevue". An account by Phillip states that the exploration party saw from Prospect Hill, "for the first time since we landed Carmathen [sic] Hills (Blue Mountains) as likewise the hills to the southward". On 18 July 1791 Phillip placed a number of men on the eastern and southern slopes of Prospect Hill, as the soils weathered from the basalt cap were richer than the sandstone derived soils of the Cumberland Plain.

The site provided a point from which distances could be meaningfully calculated, and became a major reference point for other early explorers. While there is no documentary evidence of Watkin Tench having named Prospect Hill, there is no doubt that it is in fact the hill that was shortly afterwards known by that name. In view of Tench's literary allusions to Milton's Paradise Lost, it seems highly probable that the experience of climbing it reminded him of the "goodly prospect of some forein land first-seen" by Milton's scout and that it was indeed Tench who first named it.

=== Observation, 19th century ===
Quarrying of the basalt plug in the area began in the 1820s. Charles Darwin visited this site in 1835, where he states in his notebook Notes on the Geology of places visited during the Voyage:

"At Prospect Hill the sandstone country is intermitted by a mass of Trappean rocks, the quarry which I saw consisted of a black Basalt(?) the structure of which was roughly prismatic. I imagine, but have no proof that this has burst through the Sandstone."

James Dwight Dana, an American geologist, arrived in Sydney in on 29 November 1839 and visited the intrusion site. In January 1840, William Branwhite Clarke, geologist and Church of England reverend, travelled with Dana to the intrusion site to study the rocks. Dana analysed material from the site and recorded his expedition in Vol 10 of the United States Exploring Expedition. Dana described the rock material from Prospect as:

"A dark bluish rock, finely porphyritic, with small points (not tables) of feldspar. It occurs at Prospect Hill...A porphyritic basalt, in which the augite and feldspar are both distinct, and some of the crystals of the augite are a fourth of an inch long. It occurs at Prospect Hill...The compact black basalt changes to a compact rock, with disseminated points of feldspar; next, to a porphyritic basalt, with distinct crystals of both augite and feldspar; and next, to the feldspar rock in which Augite is almost wholly wanting."

=== Land development, 1900s–present ===
The Prospect intrusion site in 2009, before industrial estate construction.

The Widemere Quarry Line, which was connected to the Main Southern Line at Fairfield railway station, was constructed in 1924 to serve the quarry until closing down in 1945. The bulk of the present CSIRO site was acquired by the Commonwealth in 1946, and a further 15 hectares was acquired in 1963, which became the primary source of roadstone for the city's expanding infrastructure until the reserves of dolerite were exhausted. In 1998 Boral reviewed its holdings with a view to future redevelopment as its quarry neared the end of its life. As at February 2001, the southern portion of the site, located within the Boral Brickworks site has been extensively quarried. The area is under immediate threat from development, which has the potential to impact upon the significance of the site.

The then Minister for Urban Affairs & Planning took over planning powers for the employment area in November 2000 and approved the Employment Precinct Plan in June 2001, approving subdivision and associated works in the northern employment lands later in June 2001. Since, parts of the employment land have been sold and further subdivided and sold. The gap in the ridge that had previously been created by quarrying has been lowered to the floor level of the quarry and the drainage of the area reversed from its earlier northward flow to empty into Prospect Creek, while a new road, Reconciliation Road, has been driven through the centre of the hill from Prospect Highway and across the gap to Wetherill Park. The land inside the oval-shaped site was levelled from 2008 to 2010 and is rapidly filling with large industrial buildings.

== Heritage listing ==
As at 19 February 2001, the area where the dolerite intrusion is situated in had state significance due to its unique combination of significant landscape feature, potential archaeological site, and association with important historical phases. As a dolerite outcrop that rises to a height of 117 metres (384 ft) AHD, it is a unique geological and significant topographic feature providing panoramic views across the Cumberland Plain. The intrusion site, which is situated on Prospect Hill, was added to the New South Wales State Heritage Register on 17 October 2003. The site is mentioned in the 'SHR Criteria C', under 'Aesthetic significance':

Prospect Hill has aesthetic significance as Sydney's largest body of igneous rock, which rises to a height of 117 metres and provides expansive views across the Cumberland Plain. The large dolerite formation of Prospect Hill is a rare geological and landmark topographic feature, lying centrally within the Cumberland Plain.

== See also ==
- Prospect Hill
- Marrong Reserve
- Homebush Bay Fault Zone
