= Ashfield Shale =

Geological formation in Australia

- Stratigraphic range: Middle Triassic (Anisian) 247–241.464 Ma
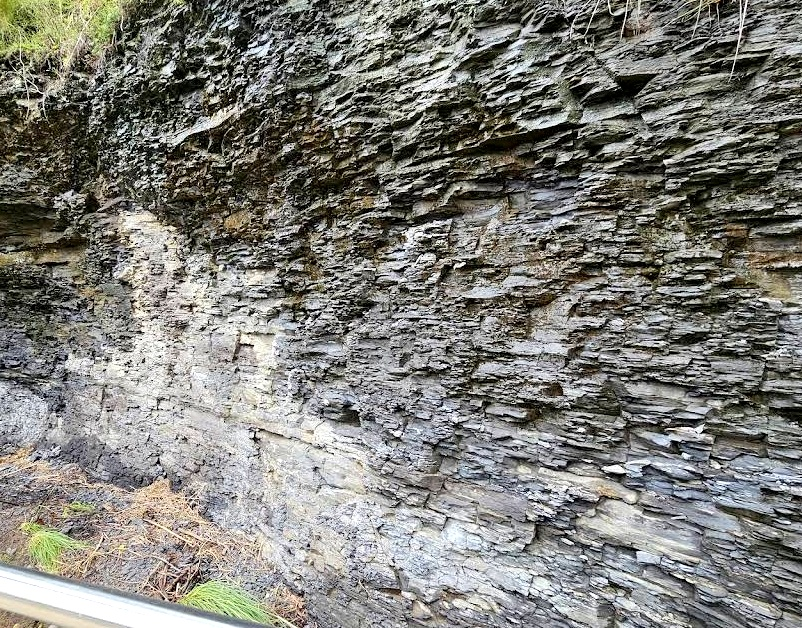
- Exposed Ashfield Shale opposite of Parramatta ferry wharf, Parramatta
- Type: Geological formation
- Unit of: Wianamatta Group
- Sub-units: Kellyville Laminite Member, Mulgoa Laminite Member, Regentville Siltstone Member, Rouse Hill Siltstone Member
- Underlies: Minchinbury Sandstone
- Overlies: Hawkesbury Sandstone, Mittagong Formation
- Thickness: Between 44.6 metres (150 ft) and 61.6 metres (200 ft)

Lithology
- Primary: Shale
- Other: Sandstone, mudstone, claystone and siltstone

Location
- Location: Sydney Basin (Greater Sydney)
- Coordinates: 34.087°S 150.755°E (Glenlee Railway Cutting)
- Country: Australia

Type section
- Named for: Ashfield
- Ashfield Shale (Australia) Ashfield Shale (New South Wales)

Ashfield Shale is a shale formation that is part of the Wianamatta Group of sedimentary rocks in the Sydney Basin, and it lies directly on contemporaneously eroded Hawkesbury Sandstone or the Mittagong Formation. The Ashfield Shale consists of strata that were formed in the Middle Triassic. Ashfield Shale is generally a dark, nearly black rock that should be distinguished from Bringelly Shale. Ashfield Shale has outcrops over many parts of the Greater Sydney area. Many structures and deep excavations were constructed on Ashfield Shale, in addition to the shale being used as a construction material.

Named after the Sydney suburb of Ashfield, this rock type is often associated with the Inner West and North Shore of the city. However, it has also been recorded at Bilpin and Mount Irvine. Ashfield Shale comprises black mudstones and silty shales with frequent sideritic ironstone bands. Measured boreholes suggest a thickness at least 44.6 metres (146 ft) at the Picton area, which increases to a total of 61.6 metres (202.1 ft) around Erskine Park. Ashfield Shale is associated with the critically endangered Blue Gum High Forest and Sydney Turpentine-Ironbark Forest.

== Description ==
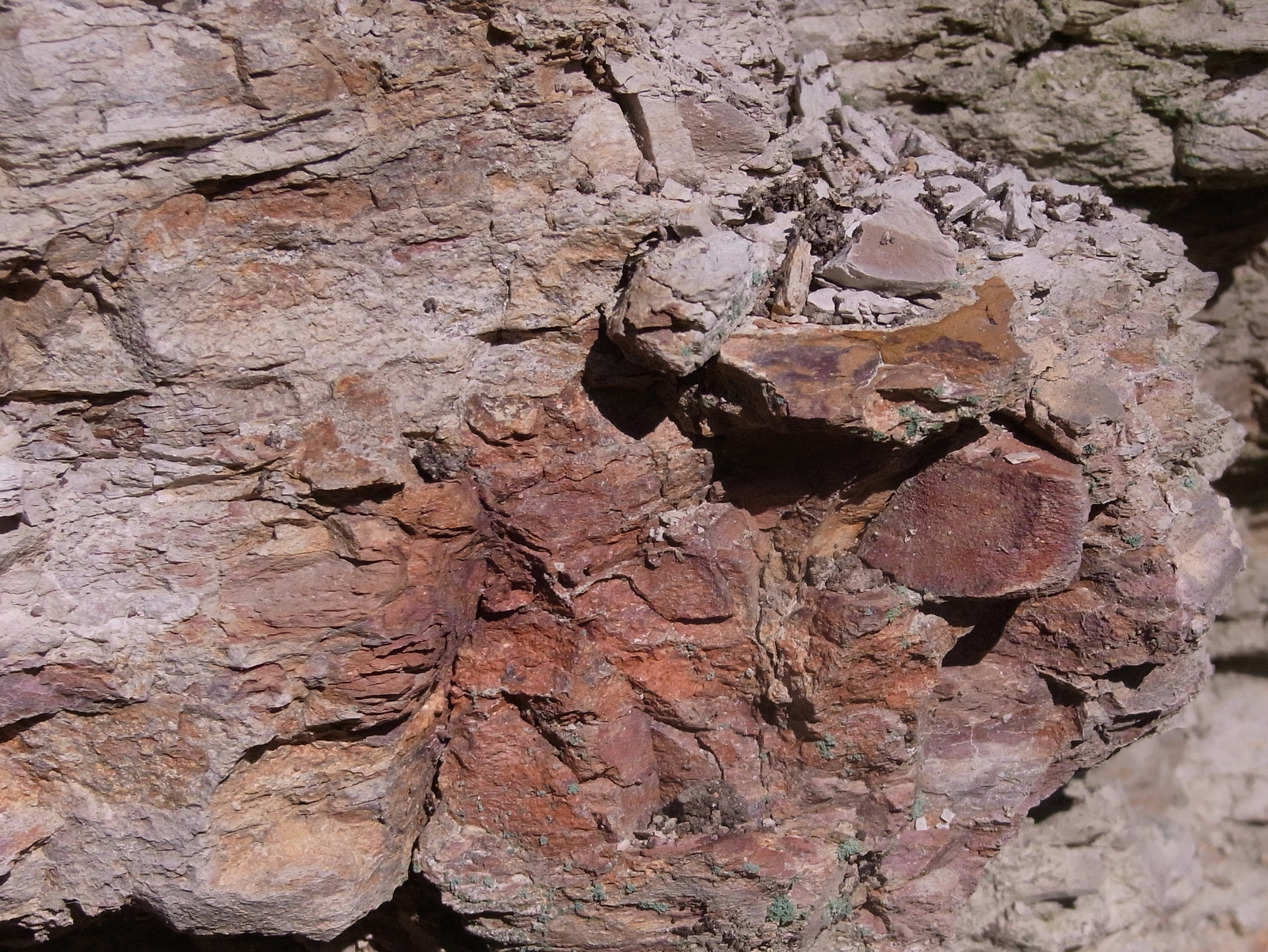
Exposed Ashfield Shale near the Pacific Highway, Chatswood

The Minchinbury Sandstone sits between the Ashfield Shale and the superimposed Bringelly Shale. The Minchinbury Sandstone serves as a buffer between the shallow water Ashfield Shale and the alluvial plain sediments of the overlying Bringelly Shale, hinting it was a strandline deposition. The lower Ashfield Shale was deposited in a freshwater environment, while upper layers hold sediments that were laid in a shallow marine or brackish environment. Being the basal formation of the Wianamatta group, Ashfield Shale is the only rock unit outcropping in the inner Sydney area. It has a minimum complete thickness of 44.6 metres (146 ft) in the Picton area and a maximum thickness of 61.6 metres (202 ft) near Erskine Park.

The geology of the shale lenses within the Hawkesbury Sandstone is lithologically similar to the Ashfield Shale. The fine grained silty sediments were laid down in a low energy, northwest flowing deltaic setting, near the shores of a shallow sea. High in the shale's formation indicate a high sand content, with ripples on the formation suggesting delta front conditions. Weathering of the shale units produces a reddish/brown podsolic soil, often with poor drainage, such as that in the Cumberland Plain. These clay soils are recognised as being reactive with an appreciable shrink-swell capacity. Because of weathering, the Ashfield shale is seldom too exposed except in quarry faces.

In Lamb's Quarry, Rooty Hill, an olivine dolerite dyke intrudes Ashfield Shale. The rocks found at the Ryde-interchange site usually consist of yellow brown and dark grey shale with light grey silty laminations and lenses. At Moorebank, the Ashfield shale regularly features black to dark grey shales with laminated silty bands. At Surry Hills, they are dark grey, horizontally bedded with coarse light grey and fine grained laminations and lenses. Generally, Ashfield Shale samples had a consistent interbedded structure, characterised by frequent, very thin light-grey silty bands within dark-grey siltstone and with an average clay mineral content of 43%. Siderite is the main cementing agent, whereas mica acts as a subsidiary cementing agent. Microscopic studies of Ashfield Shale indicate that silt-sized quartz particles are embedded within a clay matrix, with widespread distribution of siderite. Having no microcracks, the shale is highly compacted, resulting in a pronounced alignment of the clay particles. It also exhibited a typical soft-rock behaviour, with a roughly linear stress–strain response up to a peak, followed by pronounced strain softening. The Ashfield Shale is affected by faulting in parts of the Sydney region, including along the Homebush Bay Fault Zone, a major north-northeast-trending fault system extending through western and northern Sydney.

=== Lithology ===
The chemistry of the rock is typical of shales, with high iron levels, and some iron sulphide and low calcium levels. The Ashfield Shale consists of a lower sequence of dark-grey to black, sideritic claystone and siltstone lines which grade upwardly into a fine sandstone and siltstone laminite, and then into the Minchinbury Sandstone which overlies it. The lower portion mainly features dark grey claystone and siltstone laminites which grade upwards into lighter and thicker sandstone beds. Small scale bedding is abundant. The shales are sandy at the top of the sequence.

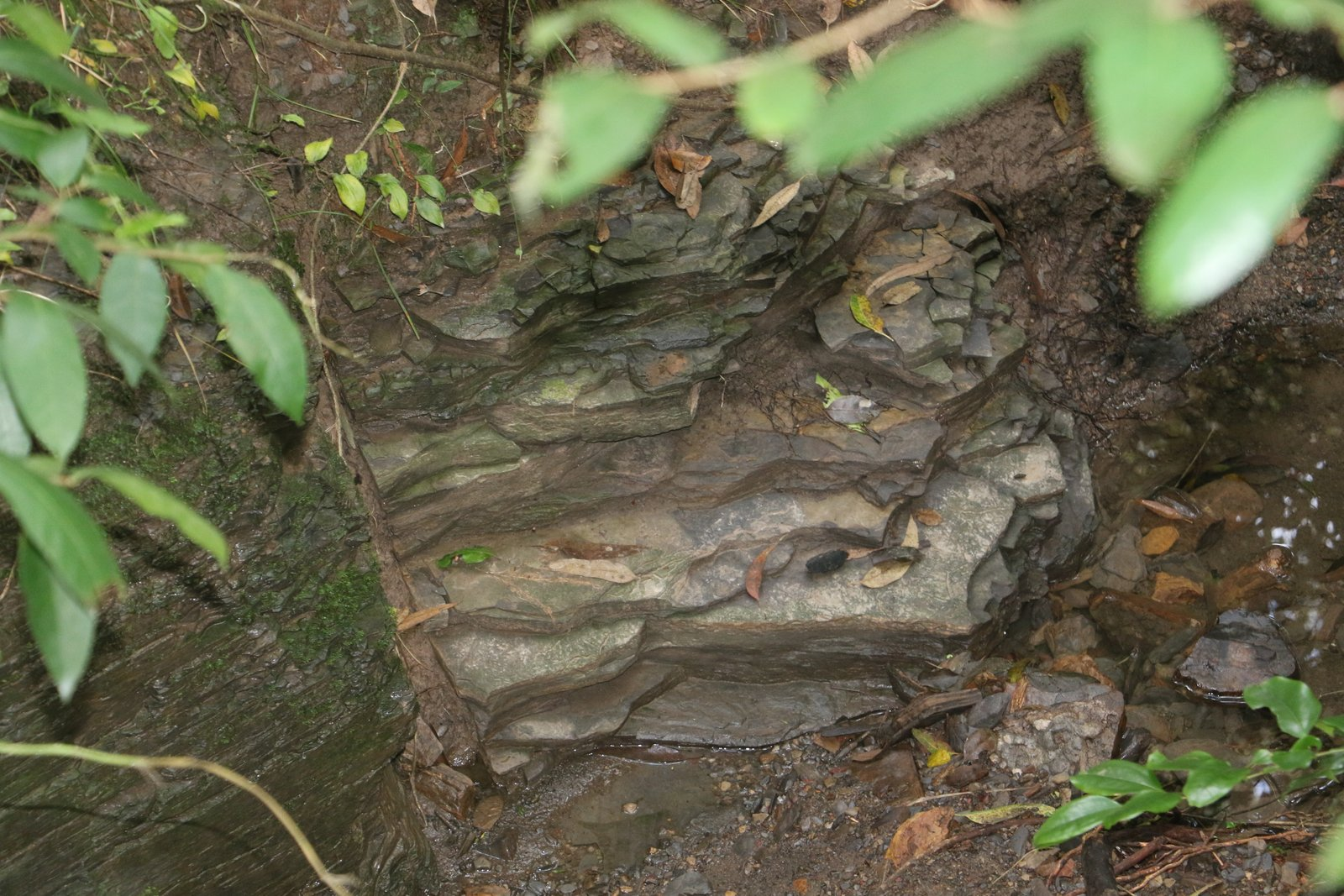
Ashfield Shale exposed at Eastwood

The porosity ranges between 5% for fresh shale from Surry Hills and Moorebank sites to around 13 % for the Ashfield Shale from the Ryde-interchange site. The Kellyville laminite is characterised by a clear increase in lithic-quartz sandstone laminations. The Regentville siltstone is made up of black to dark-grey siltstone. In some places, such as south-east of Moss Vale, it progressively becomes more sandy to the top where it is overlain by the Minchinbury sandstone. The Mulgoa laminite comprises dark-grey siltstone and fine, light-grey sandstone laminae.

== Distribution ==
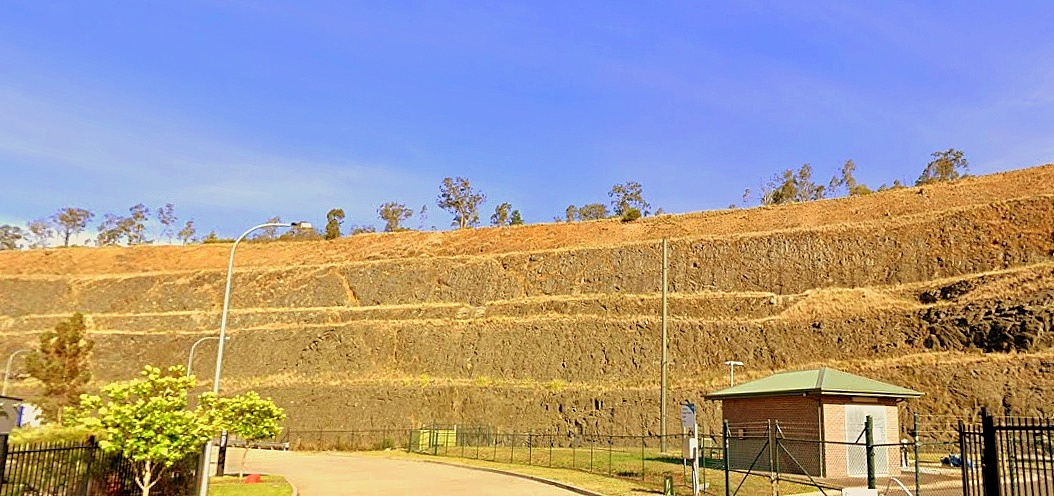
Light upper-level Ashfield Shale is present in the Prospect dolerite intrusion, in addition to the Sydney sandstone.

Herbert (1979) proposed the subdivision of the Ashfield Shale into four members, which from the ground upwards include: the Rouse Hill siltstone, the Kellyville laminite, the Regentville siltstone, and Mulgoa laminite. The Ashfield Shale covers about 80% of the Blacktown City Council, namely north of the Great Western Highway. Ashfield Shale outcrops extend to higher elevated areas and into places with higher rainfall than Bringelly Shale, such as the North Shore area where rainfall exceeds 1,000 mm (39.37 in), the Bilpin–Mountain Lagoon area and the fringes of the Illawarra escarpment where rainfall may exceed 1,500 mm (59.06 in).

The stratum of Prospect quarry in Pemulwuy comprises Hawkesbury Sandstone and lacustrine Ashfield Shale. Rocks of the Ashfield Shale represent the river-cliff in Mulgoa Nature Reserve, just south of Penrith which presents dark coloured Mulgoa Laminite Member, and as well as the river cliff opposite of the Parramatta ferry wharf. The Mulgoa cliff can be observed from Mulgoa Road through the riparian forest, though access by foot is challenging.

There are no natural sections in which the Ashfield Shale is completely exposed. However, it can be seen at railway and roadside cuttings, as well as old quarries. With weathering and exposure, the shale becomes a paler colour. The shale members were once partially exposed in the Thornleigh brick pit, though this has recently been filled in. Today, the most observable faces of Ashfield Shale are present along the North Shore and Northern railway lines and Bells Line of Road, and in several other road cutting exposures, like, Horace Street, St Ives and in the Picton–Campbelltown area.

== Engineering and construction ==
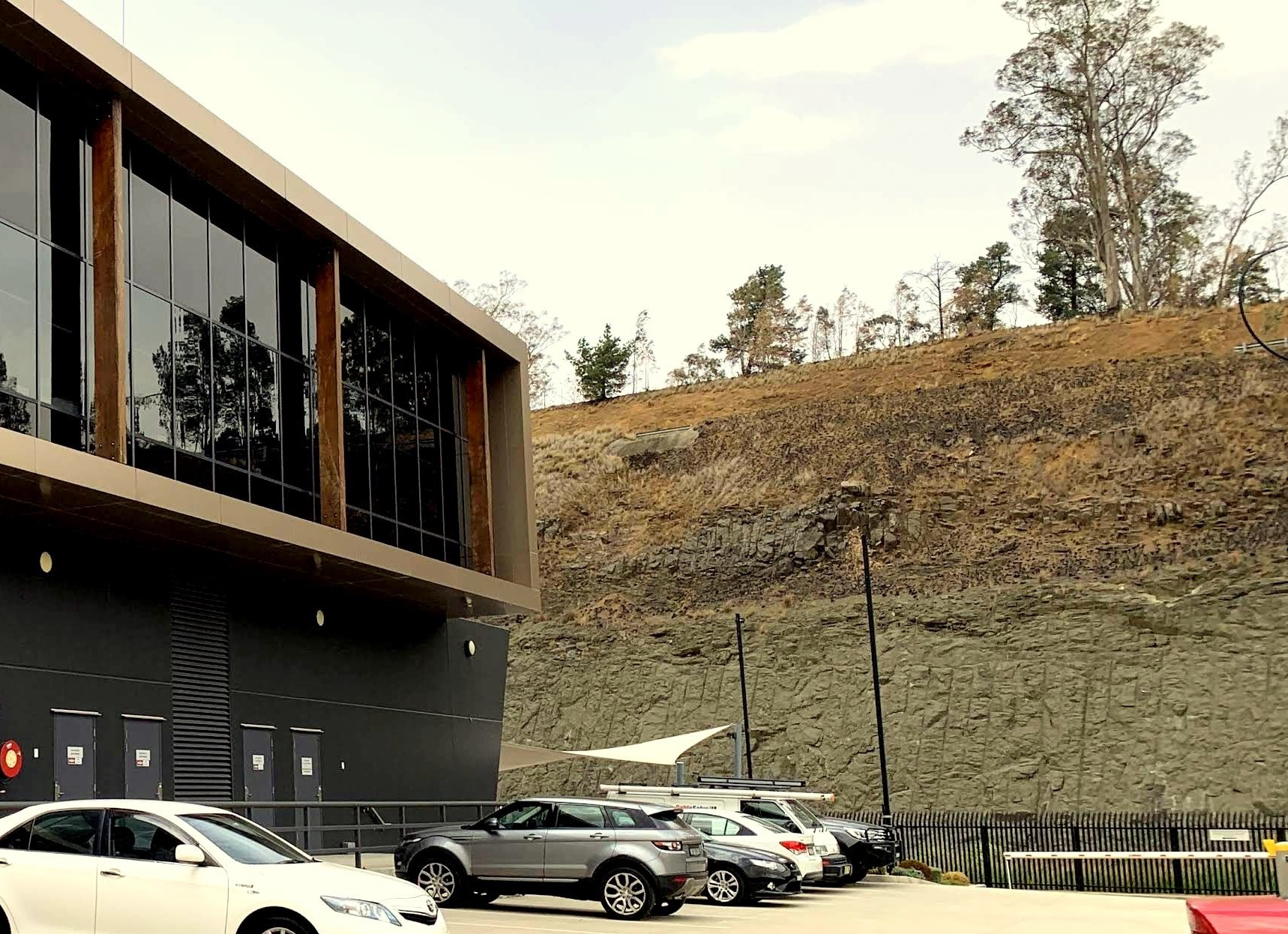
Ashfield Shale visible at the bottom strata of Prospect Hill, near industrial site, Pemulwuy.

The term Ashfield shale has been used to cover siltstone, claystone and laminite. In the earlier days of Sydney, the Ashfield Shale supported a number of quarries. The shale provided a suitable raw material for brickmaking. Sydney soils based on shale are not particularly fertile. But at Parramatta they proved more suitable to agriculture than those at Farm Cove, in the early days of the First Fleet. The Wianamatta group rocks, particularly the Ashfield Shale, and their weathering stock are important for engineering as they shape the foundations for many buildings of Sydney CBD and Western Sydney. Ashfield Shale has also been used for constructing roads. The Narellan cutting, on the abandoned Camden branch line, is cut through the Ashfield Shale.

Notwithstanding, deep excavations in Ashfield Shale can be a risky procedure with the existence of many fractures. Because the main feature of the unit is the moderately to steeply immersing continuous, planar joints that are often linked with thrust faulting, and these may at times form an unstable wedge when exposed during excavation. If not contained properly, the rock's wedge may become unstable or skid into the excavation. The Epping to Chatswood rail link (ECRL) involved drilling through a mixture of sandstone and highly weathered Ashfield Shale, which required advanced ground support measures like rock anchors to manage the high horizontal stresses.

The adjacent Hawkesbury Sandstone is considered a safer bedrock than the (less stable and laminated) Ashfield Shale for building construction. In November 2005, the construction of the Lane Cove Tunnel was affected by the collapse of an exit ramp excavation, through weak shale with low cover and a vertical dolerite dyke in the Ashfield Shale. Difficulties may be encountered where the Ashfield Shale interfaces with the Hawkesbury Sandstone and the Mittagong Formation. The term Ashfield Shale has been used to cover siltstone, claystone and laminite.

== Vertebrates ==
=== Actinopterygii ===
Actinopterygians of the Ashfield Shale
Genus	Species	Localities	Clade	Images
Cleithrolepis	C. granulatus	St. Peters Brickpits; Kogarah (Blakes Quarry)	Perleidiformes, Cleithrolepididae	Fossil of C. granulatus.
Elonichthys	E. armatus	St. Peters Brickpits	Palaeonisciformes, Palaeoniscidae	Fossil of E. armatus.
Elonichthys	E. semilineatus	St. Peters Brickpits	Palaeonisciformes, Palaeoniscidae	Fossil of E. semilineatus.
Elpisopholis	E. dunstani	St. Peters Brickpits	Palaeonisciformes, Palaeoniscidae	Fossil of E. dunstani.
Myriolepis	M. pectinata	St. Peters Brickpits	Palaeonisciformes, Palaeoniscidae	Fossil of M. pectinata.
Palaeoniscus	P. antipodeus	Parramatta (Parsonage Hill); St. Peters Brickpits	Palaeonisciformes, Palaeoniscidae	Fossil of P. antipodeus.
Palaeoniscus	P. crassus	St. Peters Brickpits	Palaeonisciformes, Palaeoniscidae	Fossil of P. crassus.
Platysomus	P. sp.	St. Peters Brickpits	Platysomiformes, Platysomidae	Fossil of the related P. striatus.
Promecosomina	P. formosa	St. Peters Brickpits	Parasemionotiformes, Promecosominidae	Fossil of P. formosa.
Semionotus	?S. sp.	Gibraltar Tunnel Railway Cutting	Semionotiformes, Semionotidae	Life restoration of the related S. elegans.

=== Chondrichthyes ===
Chondrichthyans of the Ashfield Shale
Genus	Species	Localities	Clade	Images
Mooreodontus	M. parvidens	St. Peters Brickpits	Xenacanthiformes, Xenacanthidae	Fossil of M. parvidens.
Xenacanthidae indet.	Multiple sp. indet.	Gibraltar Tunnel Railway Cutting; Parramatta (Parsonage Hill)	Xenacanthiformes, Xenacanthidae	Fossil of indeterminate xenacanthid.

=== Sarcopterygii ===
Sarcopterygians of the Ashfield Shale
Genus	Species	Localities	Clade	Images
Archaeoceratodus	A. avus	St. Peters Brickpits	Ceratodontiformes, Ceratodontidae	Sketch of A. avus specimen.

=== Temnospondyli ===
Temnospondyls of the Ashfield Shale
Genus	Species	Localities	Clade	Images
Microposaurus	M. averyi	Picton Area	Temnospondyli, Trematosauridae	Life restoration of M. averyi.
Notobrachyops	N. picketti	Mortdale (Hurstville Brick Co. Quarry)	Temnospondyli, Brachyopidae	Life restoration of N. picketti.
Paracyclotosaurus	P. davidi	St. Peters Brickpits	Temnospondyli, Mastodonsauridae	Reconstruction of P. davidi.
Brachyopidae indet.	sp. indet.	St. Peters Brickpits	Temnospondyli, Brachyopidae	

== Invertebrates ==
=== Crustaceans ===
Crustaceans of the Ashfield Shale
Genus	Species	Localities	Clade	Images
Protamphisopus	P. wianamattensis	St. Peters Brickpits	Isopoda, Amphisopodidae	Fossil of P. wianamattensis.

=== Insects ===
Insects of the Ashfield Shale
Genus	Species	Localities	Clade	Images
Ademosyne	A. wianamattensis	Narellan Railway Cutting	Coleoptera, Ademosynidae	Fossil of A. wianamattensis.
Elateridium	E. wianamattensis	St. Peters Brickpits	Coleoptera, Elateridae	Sketch of E. wianamattensis specimen.
Etheridgea	E. petrica	St. Peters Brickpits	Coleoptera, Curculionidae	Sketch of E. petrica specimen.
Iverya	I. averyi	Parramatta (Parsonage Hill)	Odonata, Triadotypidae	Fossil of I. averyi.
Mesorhynchophora	M. dunstani	St. Peters Brickpits	Coleoptera, Curculionidae	Sketch of M. dunstani specimen.
Mesotitan	M. giganteus	St. Peters Brickpits	Titanoptera, Mesotitanidae	
Metrorhynchites	M. sydneiensis	St. Peters Brickpits	Coleoptera, Schizocoleidae	Sketch of M. sydneiensis specimen.
Notoblattites	N. subcostalis	St. Peters Brickpits	Blattodea, incertae sedis	Sketch of N. subcostalis specimen.

=== Molluscs ===
Molluscs of the Ashfield Shale
Genus	Species	Localities	Clade	Images
Protovirgus	P. sp.	Bowral Brick Quarry; St. Peters Brickpits	Venerida, Glauconomidae	Fossil of P. sp. (Bowral Brick Quarry)
Unio	U. sp.	Croydon	Unionida, Unionidae	
Unionella	P. wianamattensis	Gibraltar Tunnel Railway Cutting; Waterloo (Goodlet and Smith's Brickclay Quarry)	Venerida, Glauconomidae	Fossil of U. wianamattensis.

== Plants ==
Color key: Taxon / Reclassified taxon / Taxon falsely reported as present / Dubious taxon or junior synonym / Ichnotaxon / Ootaxon / Morphotaxon

Notes
Uncertain or tentative taxa are in small text
~~crossed out~~ taxa are discredited.

=== Plants ===
Plants of the Ashfield Shale
Genus	Species	Localities	Clade	Images
Cladophlebis	C. australis	St. Peters Brickpits	Osmundales, Osmundaceae	Fossil of C. australis.
Cycadopteris	C.? scolopendrina	St. Peters Brickpits	Cycadales, incertae sedis	Fossil of C.? scolopendrina.
Cylostrobus	C. sydneyensis	Brick Quarry; Gibraltar Tunnel Railway Cutting	Isoetales, Pleuromeiaceae	Fossil of C. sydneyensis.
Dicroidium	D. antevsiana	Parramatta (Parsonage Hill)	Corystospermales, Corystospermaceae	Fossil of D. odontopteroides.
Dicroidium	D. lancifolium	Mortdale (Hurstville Brick Co. Quarry)	Corystospermales, Corystospermaceae	Fossil of D. odontopteroides.
Dicroidium	D. odontopteroides	Mortdale (Hurstville Brick Co. Quarry); St. Peters Brickpits	Corystospermales, Corystospermaceae	Fossil of D. odontopteroides.
Ginkgo	G. digitata	St. Peters Brickpits	Ginkgoales, Ginkgoaceae	Fossil of G. digitata (Sydney S.s.).
Phyllotheca	P. sp.	Ingleburn	Equisetales, Phyllothecaceae	Fossil of P. sp. (Sydney S.s.)
Salisburia	S. palmata	St. Peters Brickpits	Ginkgoales, Ginkgoaceae	Fossil of S. palmata.
Schizoneura	S. sp.	Mortdale (Hurstville Brick Co. Quarry)	Equisetales, incertae sedis	
Taeniopteris	T. crassinervis	St. Peters Brickpits	Tracheophytes, incertae sedis	Fossil of the related Taeniopteris sp.

== See also ==
- Bringelly Shale
