= Mittagong Formation =

Rock formation in New South Wales, Australia

- Stratigraphic range: Triassic
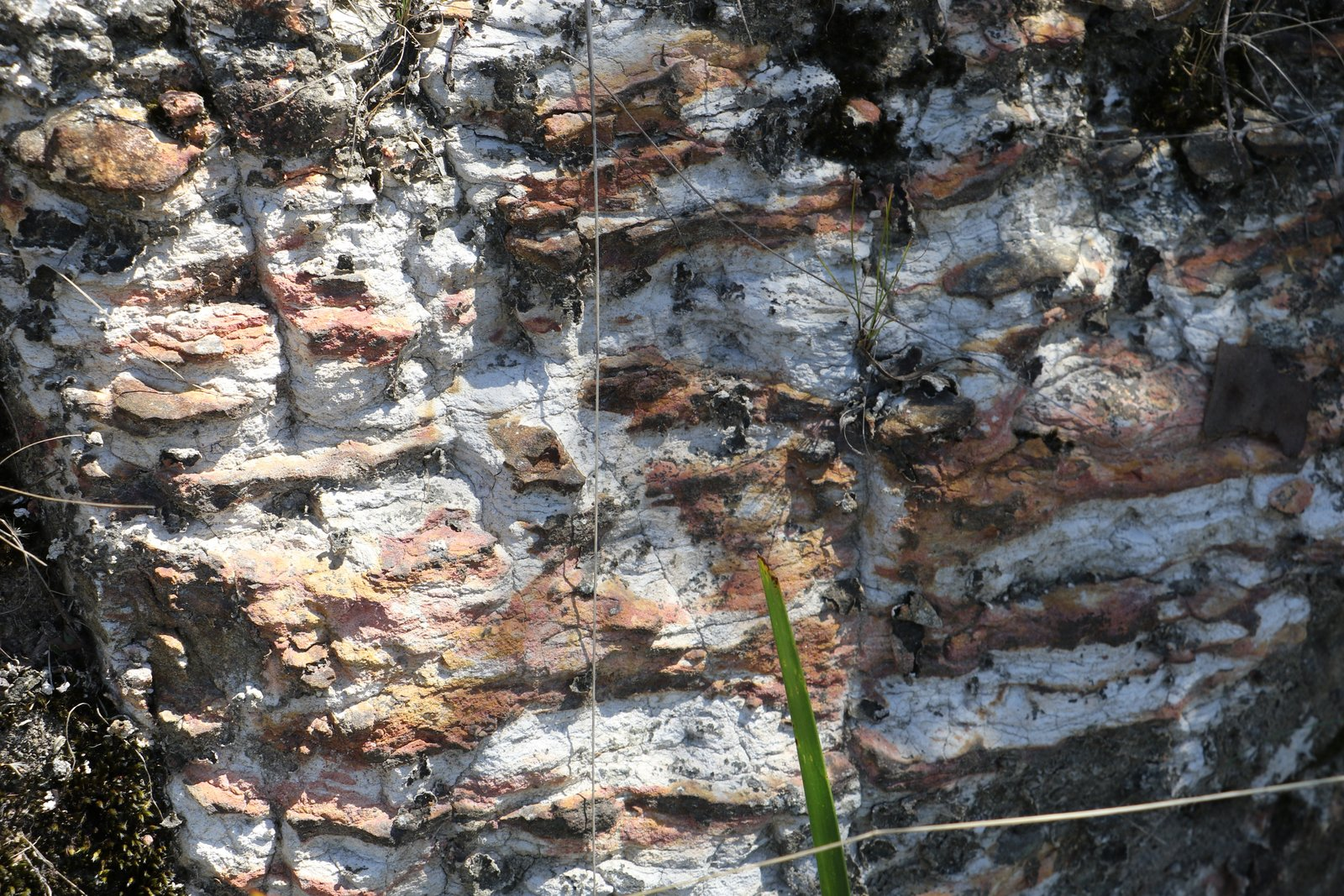
- Mount Ku-ring-gai, Australia
- Type: Geological formation
- Underlies: Ashfield Shale
- Overlies: Hawkesbury sandstone
- Thickness: up to 10 metres (30 ft)

Location
- Location: Sydney Basin
- Country: Australia

Type section
- Region: Mittagong
- Country: Australia
- Thickness at type section: 15 metres

The Mittagong Formation is a sedimentary rock unit in the Sydney Basin in eastern Australia.

== Formation ==
Laid down in the Triassic Period, it may be seen as an interval of interbedded fine-grained sandstone and shale between the Ashfield Shale (above) and the Hawkesbury sandstone (below). The maximum thickness around Sydney may be ten metres. Near Town Hall railway station, the formation is 8 metres thick. In the type area at Mittagong it is 15 metres thick.

== Whereabouts ==
In northern Sydney it can be seen in several areas, such as West Pymble and Mount Ku-ring-gai. This rock formation is associated with the critically endangered Sydney Turpentine-Ironbark Forest.

== See also ==
- Narrabeen group
