= Shale =

Fine-grained, clastic sedimentary rock

- Sedimentary rock
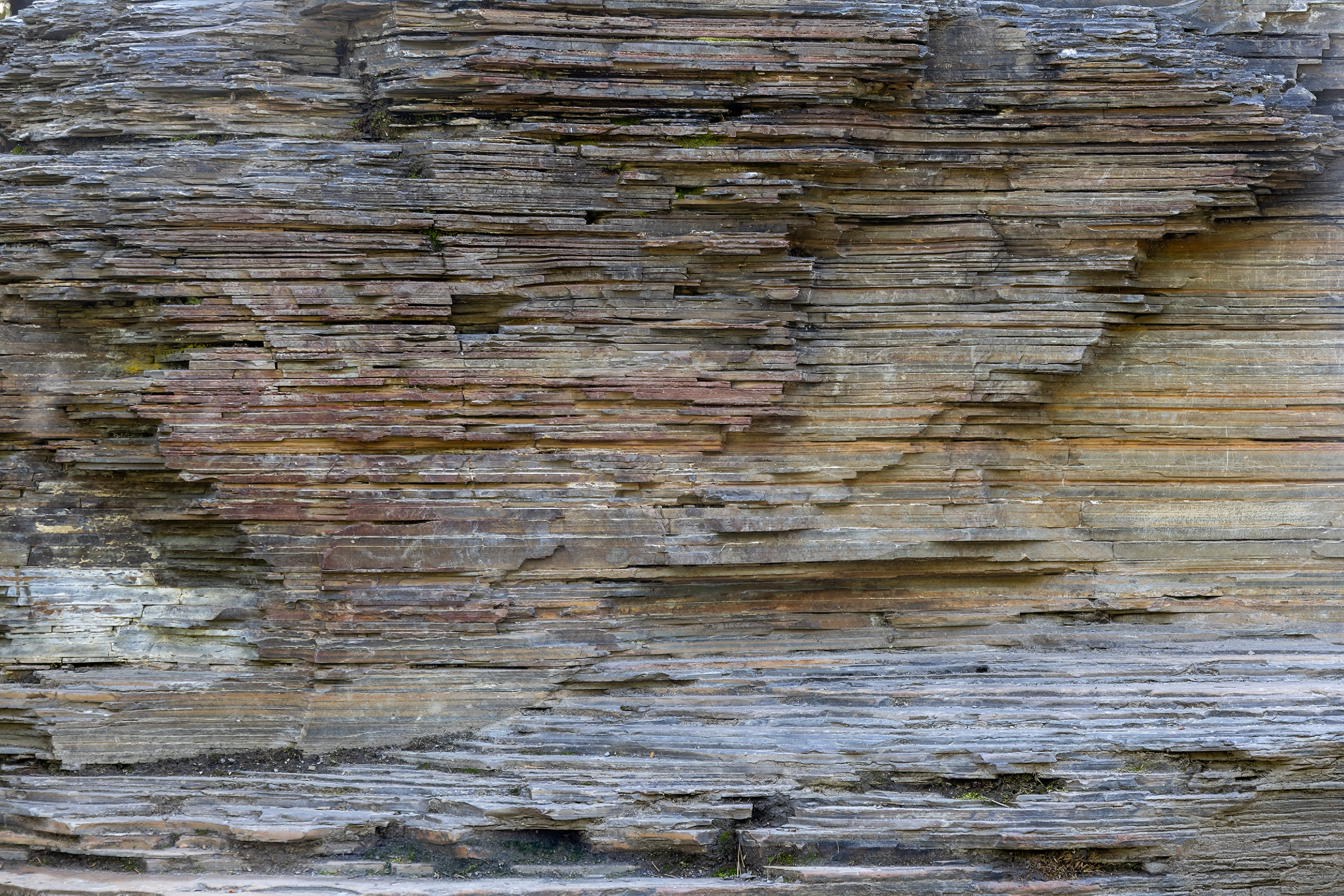
- Shale

Composition
- Clay minerals and quartz

Shale is a fine-grained, clastic sedimentary rock formed from mud that is a mix of flakes of clay minerals (hydrous aluminium phyllosilicates, e.g., kaolin, Al_{2}Si_{2}O_{5}(OH)_{4}) and tiny fragments (silt-sized particles) of other minerals, especially quartz and calcite. Shale is characterized by its tendency to split into thin layers (laminae) less than one centimeter in thickness. This property is called fissility. Shale is the most common sedimentary rock.

The term shale is sometimes applied more broadly, as essentially a synonym for mudrock, rather than in the narrower sense of clay-rich fissile mudrock.

== Texture ==
Shale typically exhibits varying degrees of fissility. Because of the parallel orientation of clay mineral flakes in shale, it breaks into thin layers, often splintery and usually parallel to the otherwise indistinguishable bedding planes. Non-fissile rocks of similar composition and particle size (less than 0.0625 mm) are described as mudstones (1/3 to 2/3 silt particles) or claystones (less than 1/3 silt). Rocks with similar particle sizes but with less clay (greater than 2/3 silt) and therefore grittier are siltstones.

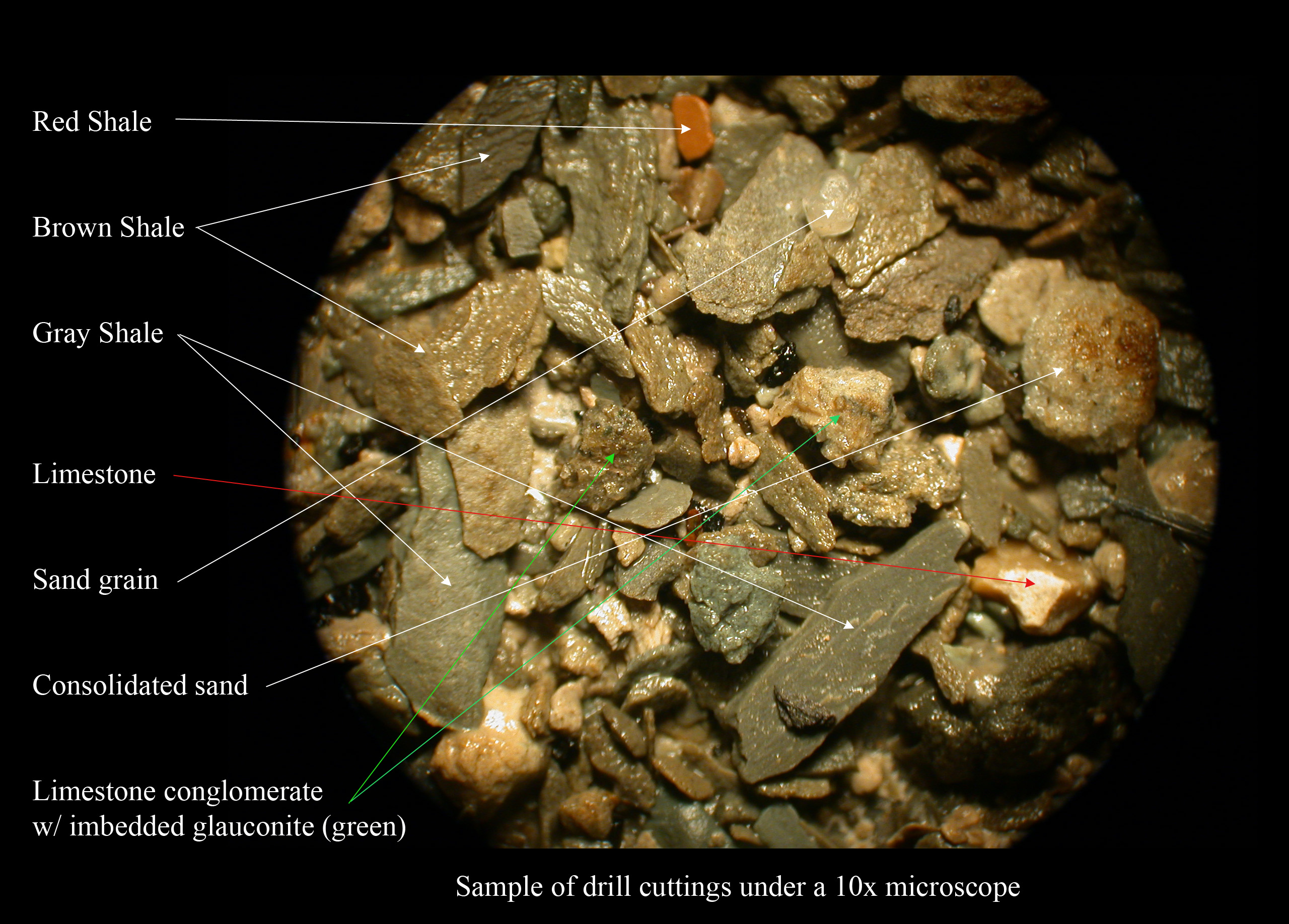
Sample of drill cuttings of shale while drilling an oil well in Louisiana, United States. Sand grain = 2 mm in diameter

== Composition and color ==
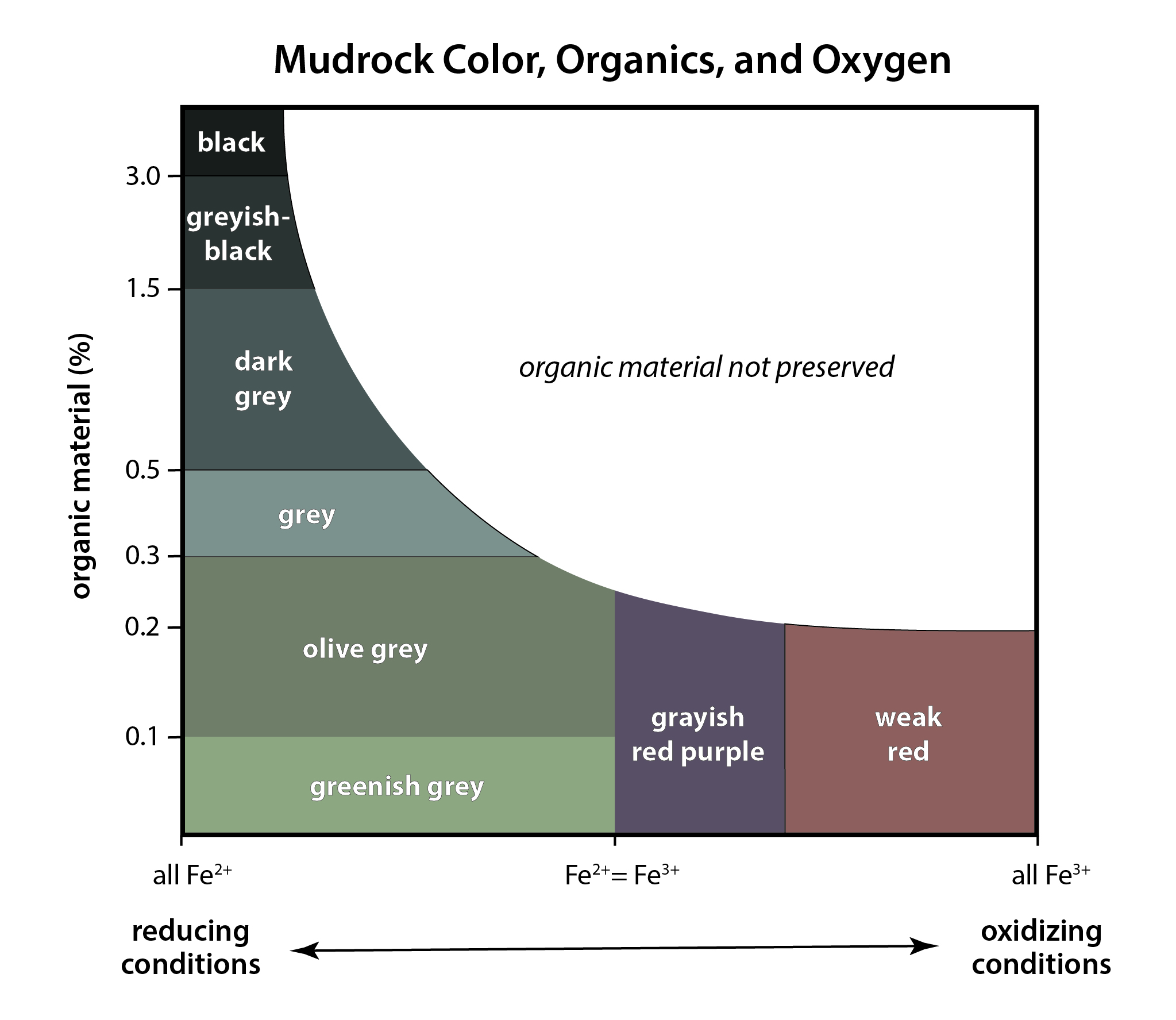
Color chart for shale based on oxidation state and organic carbon content

Shales are typically grey in color and are composed of clay minerals and quartz grains. The addition of variable amounts of minor constituents alters the color of the rock. Red, brown and green colors are indicative of ferric oxide (hematite – reds), iron hydroxide (goethite – browns and limonite – yellow), or micaceous minerals (chlorite, biotite and illite – greens). The color shifts from reddish to greenish as iron in the oxidized (ferric) state is converted to iron in the reduced (ferrous) state. Black shale results from the presence of greater than one percent carbonaceous material and indicates a reducing environment. Pale blue to blue-green shales typically are rich in carbonate minerals.

Clays are the major constituent of shales and other mudrocks. The clay minerals represented are largely kaolinite, montmorillonite and illite. Clay minerals of Late Tertiary mudstones are expandable smectites, whereas in older rocks (especially in mid-to early Paleozoic shales) illites predominate. The transformation of smectite to illite produces silica, sodium, calcium, magnesium, iron and water. These released elements form authigenic quartz, chert, calcite, dolomite, ankerite, hematite and albite, all trace to minor (except quartz) minerals found in shales and other mudrocks. A typical shale is composed of about 58% clay minerals, 28% quartz, 6% feldspar, 5% carbonate minerals, and 2% iron oxides. Most of the quartz is detrital (part of the original sediments that formed the shale) rather than authigenic (crystallized within the shale after deposition).

Shales and other mudrocks contain roughly 95 percent of the organic matter in all sedimentary rocks. However, this amounts to less than one percent by mass in an average shale. Black shales, which form in anoxic conditions, contain reduced free carbon along with ferrous iron (Fe^{2+}) and sulfur (S^{2−}). Amorphous iron sulfide, along with carbon, produce the black coloration. Because amorphous iron sulfide gradually converts to pyrite, which is not an important pigment, young shales may be quite dark from their iron sulfide content, in spite of a modest carbon content (less than 1%), while a black color in an ancient shale indicates a high carbon content.

Most shales are marine in origin, and the groundwater in shale formations is often highly saline. There is evidence that shale acts as a semipermeable medium, allowing water to pass through while retaining dissolved salts.

== Formation ==
The fine particles that compose shale can remain suspended in water long after the larger particles of sand have been deposited. As a result, shales are typically deposited in very slow moving water and are often found in lakes and lagoonal deposits, in river deltas, on floodplains and offshore below the wave base. Thick deposits of shale are found near ancient continental margins and foreland basins. Some of the most widespread shale formations were deposited by epicontinental seas. Black shales are common in Cretaceous strata on the margins of the Atlantic Ocean, where they were deposited in fault-bounded silled basins associated with the opening of the Atlantic during the breakup of Pangaea. These basins were anoxic, in part because of restricted circulation in the narrow Atlantic, and in part because the very warm Cretaceous seas lacked the circulation of cold bottom water that oxygenates the deep oceans today.

Most clay must be deposited as aggregates and floccules, since the settling rate of individual clay particles is extremely slow. Flocculation is very rapid once the clay encounters highly saline sea water. Whereas individual clay particles are less than 4 microns in size, the clumps of clay particles produced by flocculation vary in size from a few tens of microns to over 700 microns in diameter. The floccules start out water-rich, but much of the water is expelled from the floccules as the clay minerals bind more tightly together over time (a process called syneresis). Clay pelletization by organisms that filter feed is important where flocculation is inhibited. Filter feeders produce an estimated 12 metric tons of clay pellets per square kilometer per year along the U.S. Gulf Coast.

As sediments continue to accumulate, the older, more deeply buried sediments begin to undergo diagenesis. This mostly consists of compaction and lithification of the clay and silt particles. Early stages of diagenesis, described as eogenesis, take place at shallow depths (a few tens of meters) and are characterized by bioturbation and mineralogical changes in the sediments, with only slight compaction. Pyrite may be formed in anoxic mud at this stage of diagenesis.

Deeper burial is accompanied by mesogenesis, during which most of the compaction and lithification takes place. As the sediments come under increasing pressure from overlying sediments, sediment grains move into more compact arrangements, ductile grains (such as clay mineral grains) are deformed, and pore space is reduced. In addition to this physical compaction, chemical compaction may take place via pressure solution. Points of contact between grains are under the greatest strain, and the strained mineral is more soluble than the rest of the grain. As a result, the contact points are dissolved away, allowing the grains to come into closer contact.

It is during compaction that shale develops its fissility, likely through mechanical compaction of the original open framework of clay particles. The particles become strongly oriented into parallel layers that give the shale its distinctive fabric. Fissility likely develops early in the compaction process, at relatively shallow depth, since fissility does not seem to vary with depth in thick formations. Kaolinite flakes have less tendency to align in parallel layers than other clays, so kaolinite-rich clay is more likely to form nonfissile mudstone than shale. On the other hand, black shales often have very pronounced fissility (paper shales) due to binding of hydrocarbon molecules to the faces of the clay particles, which weakens the binding between particles.

Lithification follows closely on compaction, as increased temperatures at depth hasten deposition of cement that binds the grains together. Pressure solution contributes to cementing, as the mineral dissolved from strained contact points is redeposited in the unstrained pore spaces. The clay minerals may be altered as well. For example, smectite is altered to illite at temperatures of about 55 to 200 °C (130 to 390 °F), releasing water in the process. Other alteration reactions include the alteration of smectite to chlorite and of kaolinite to illite at temperatures between 120 and 150 °C (250 and 300 °F). Because of these reactions, illite composes 80% of Precambrian shales, versus about 25% of young shales.

Unroofing of buried shale is accompanied by telogenesis, the third and final stage of diagenesis. As erosion reduces the depth of burial, renewed exposure to meteoric water produces additional changes to the shale, such as dissolution of some of the cement to produce secondary porosity. Pyrite may be oxidized to produce gypsum.

Black shales are dark, as a result of being especially rich in unoxidized carbon. Common in some Paleozoic and Mesozoic strata, black shales were deposited in anoxic, reducing environments, such as in stagnant water columns. Some black shales contain abundant heavy metals such as molybdenum, uranium, vanadium, and zinc. The enriched values are of controversial origin, having been alternatively attributed to input from hydrothermal fluids during or after sedimentation or to slow accumulation from sea water over long periods of sedimentation.

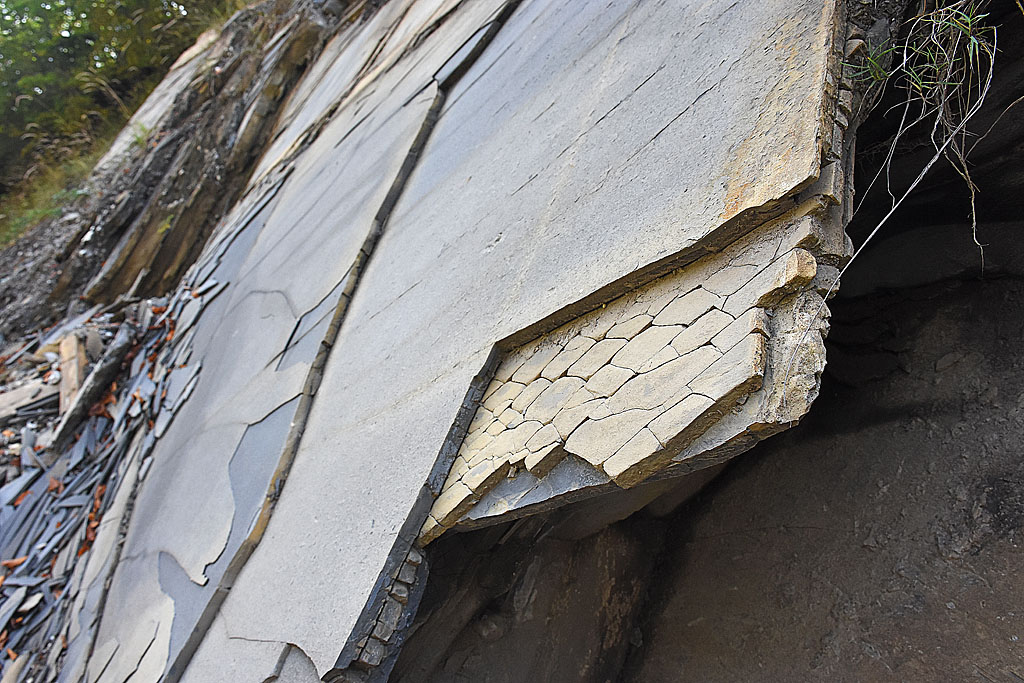
Shale in Potokgraben, the Karawanks, Austria

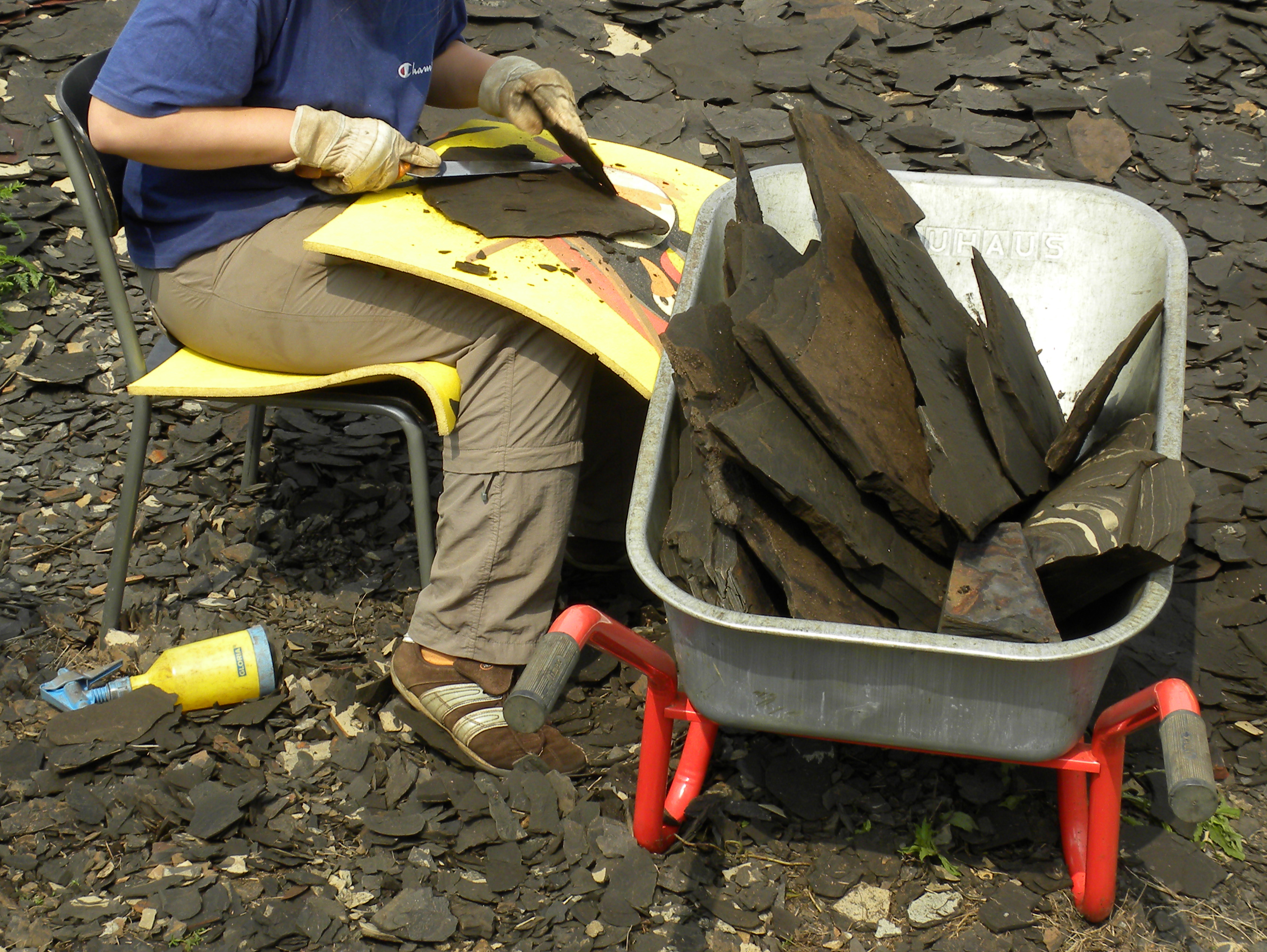
Splitting shale (Messel oil shale) with a large knife to reveal fossils

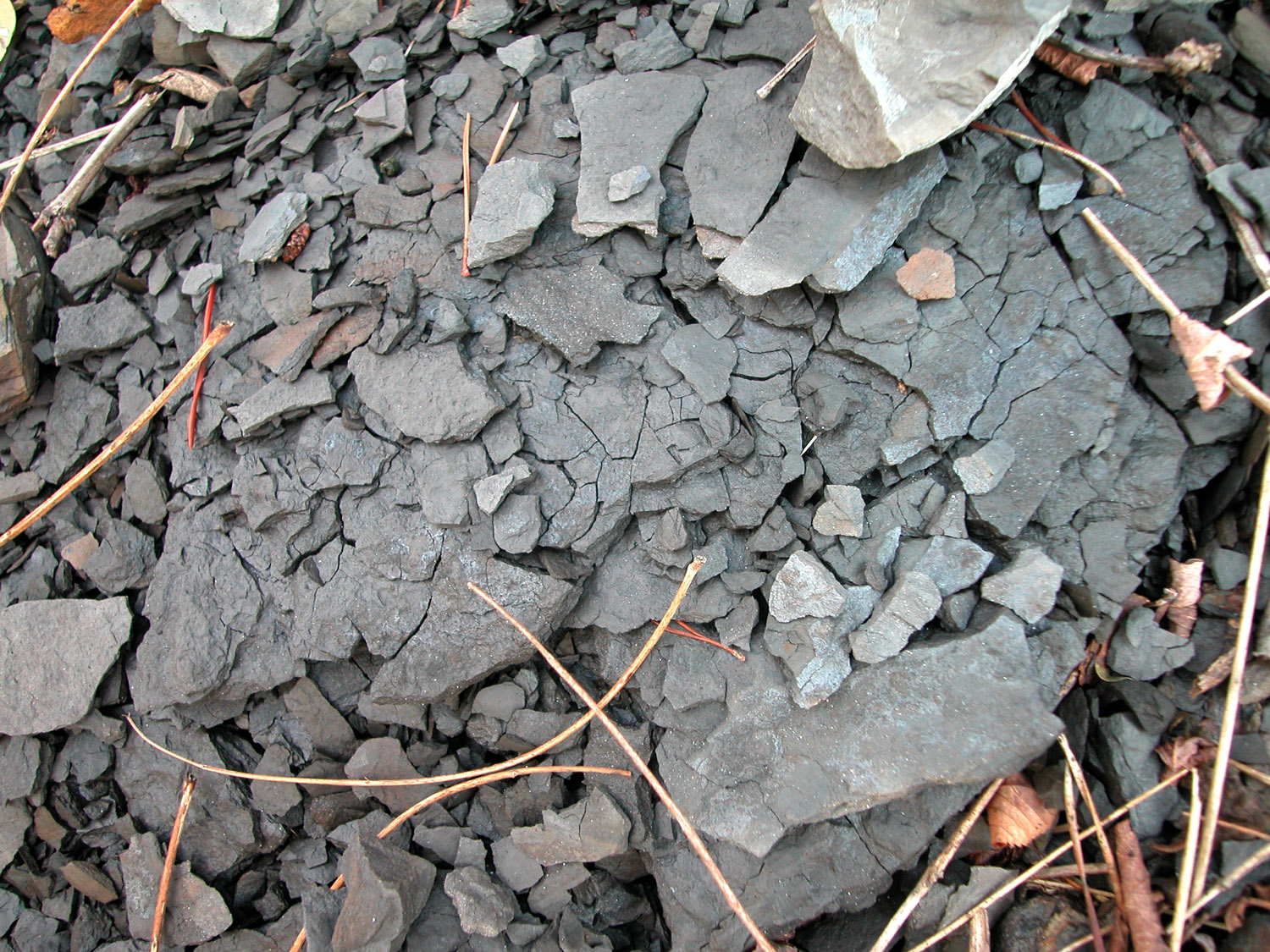
Weathering shale at a road cut in southeastern Kentucky

Fossils, animal tracks or burrows and even raindrop impressions are sometimes preserved on shale bedding surfaces. Shales may also contain concretions consisting of pyrite, apatite, or various carbonate minerals.

Shales that are subject to heat and pressure of metamorphism alter into a hard, fissile, metamorphic rock known as slate. With continued increase in metamorphic grade the sequence is phyllite, then schist and finally gneiss.

== As hydrocarbon source rock ==
Shale is the most common source rock for hydrocarbons (natural gas and petroleum). The lack of coarse sediments in most shale beds reflects the absence of strong currents in the waters of the depositional basin. These might have oxygenated the waters and destroyed organic matter before it could accumulate. The absence of carbonate rock in shale beds reflects the absence of organisms that might have secreted carbonate skeletons, also likely due to an anoxic environment. As a result, about 95% of organic matter in sedimentary rocks is found in shales and other mudrocks. Individual shale beds typically have an organic matter content of about 1%, but the richest source rocks may contain as much as 40% organic matter.

The organic matter in shale is converted over time from the original proteins, polysaccharides, lipids, and other organic molecules to kerogen, which at the higher temperatures found at greater depths of burial is further converted to graphite and petroleum.

== Historical mining terminology ==
Before the mid-19th century, the terms slate, shale and schist were not sharply distinguished. In the context of underground coal mining, shale was frequently referred to as slate well into the 20th century. Black shale associated with coal seams is called black metal.

== See also ==
- Bakken Formation – Geological formation in North America
- Barnett Shale – Geological formation in Texas, United States
- Bearpaw Formation – Geologic formation in North America
- Burgess Shale – Fossil-bearing rock formation in the Canadian Rockies
- Emu Bay Shale – Geological formation in South Australia
- Marcellus Formation – Middle Devonian age unit of sedimentary rock
- Mazon Creek fossil beds – Conservation lagerstätte in Illinois on the National Register of Historic Places
- Oil shale – Organic-rich fine-grained sedimentary rock containing kerogen
- Shale gas – Natural gas trapped in shale formations
- Wheeler Shale – Geologic formation in Utah notable for trilobite fossils
- Bringelly Shale – Triassic age unit of sedimentary rock in Australia
- Ashfield Shale – Geological formation in Australia
