= Long Reef (New South Wales) =

Headland in the Northern Beaches of Sydney, Australia

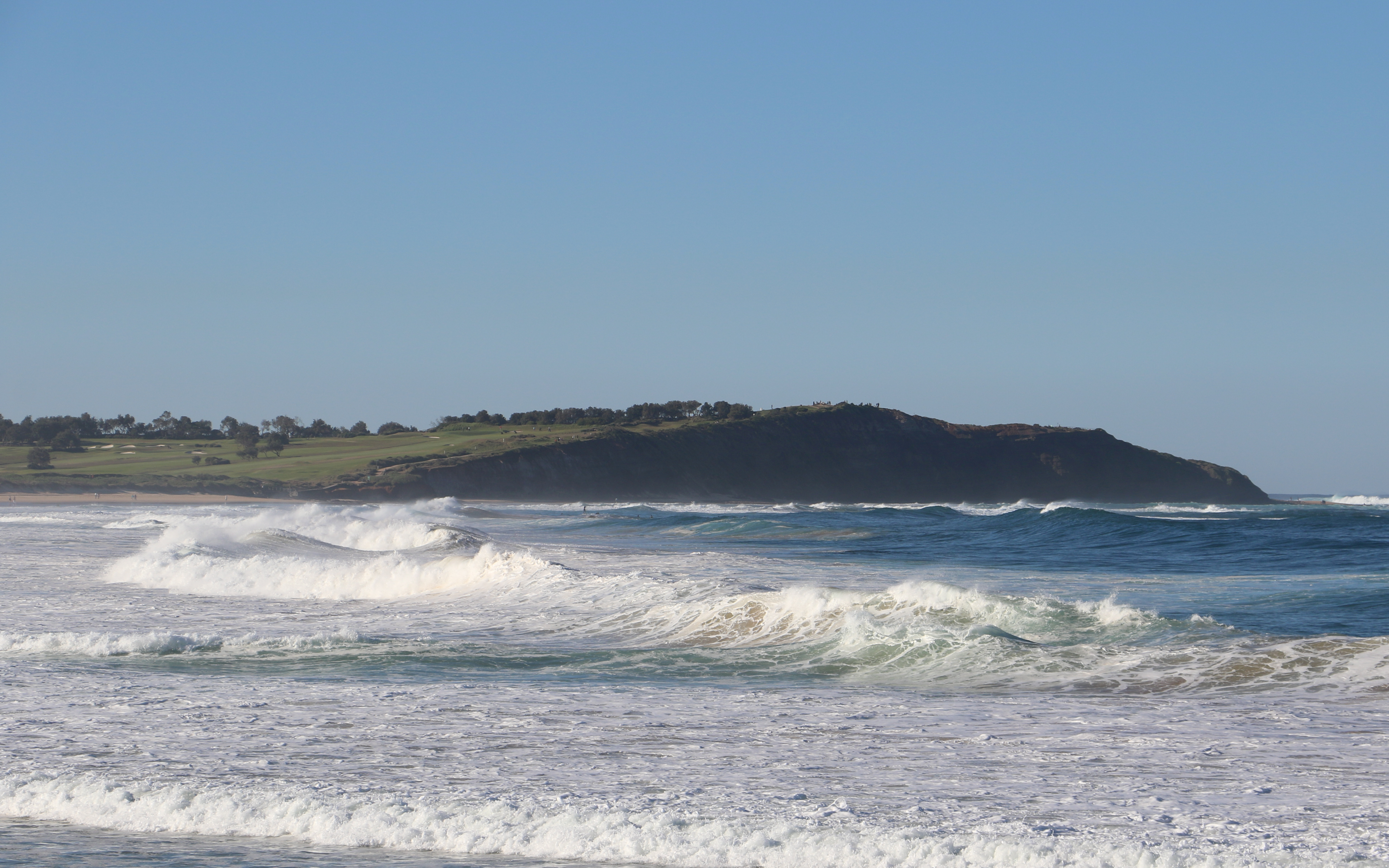
- Long Reef photographed from Dee Why

Highest point
- Elevation: 45 m (148 ft); AHD
- Coordinates: 33°44.526′S 151°19.0′E

Geography
- Location within New South Wales
- Location: Collaroy, New South Wales, Australia

Geology
- Rock age: Triassic

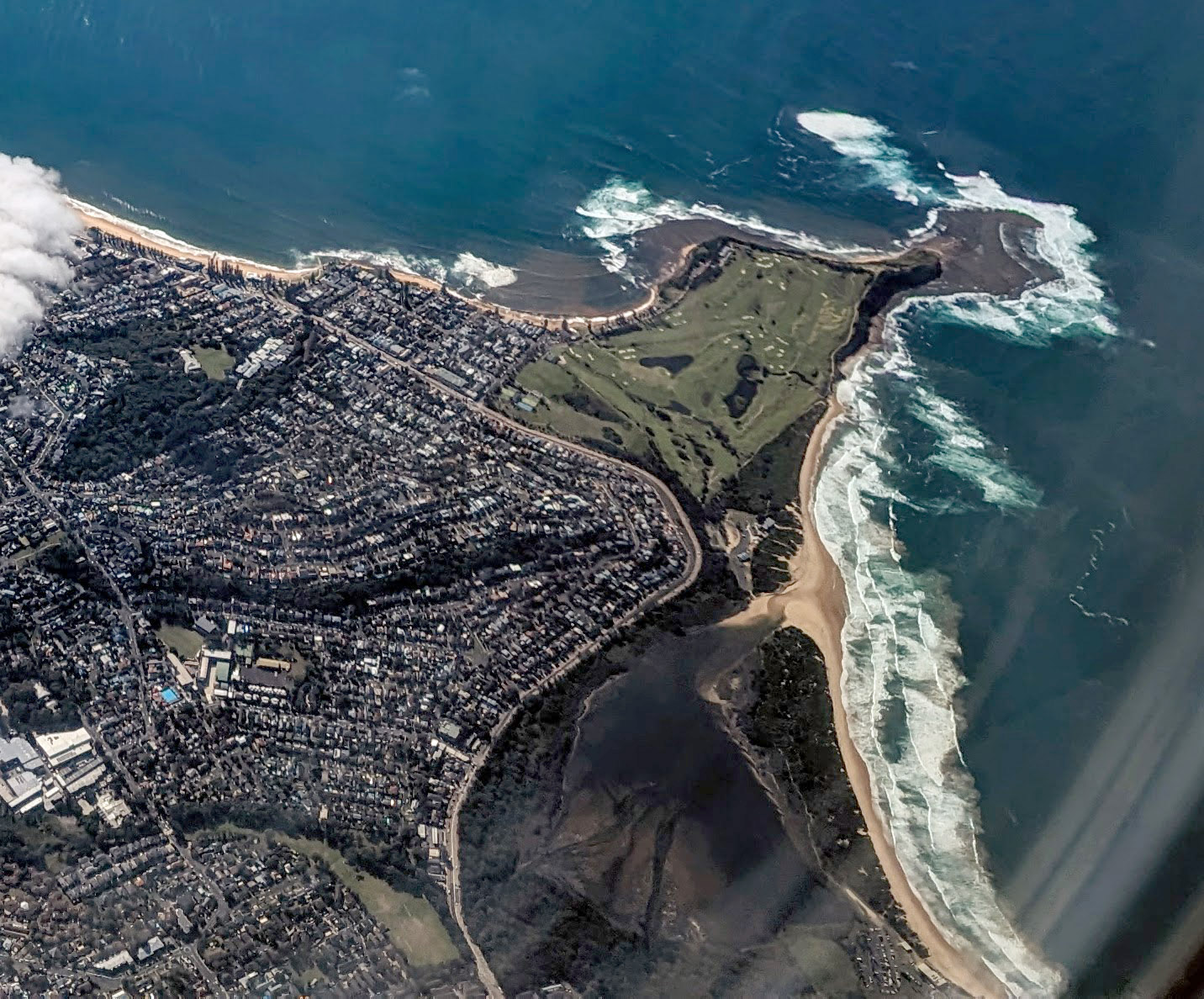
Aerial view of Long Reef Beach, headland, and golf course; Collaroy Beach at upper left

Long Reef is a prominent headland on the Northern Beaches of Sydney, Australia. Connected to the mainland by a tombolo, the reef has an extensive wave-cut platform. Long Reef is a popular recreational destination and is one of the more interesting geological areas in Sydney.

== Geology ==
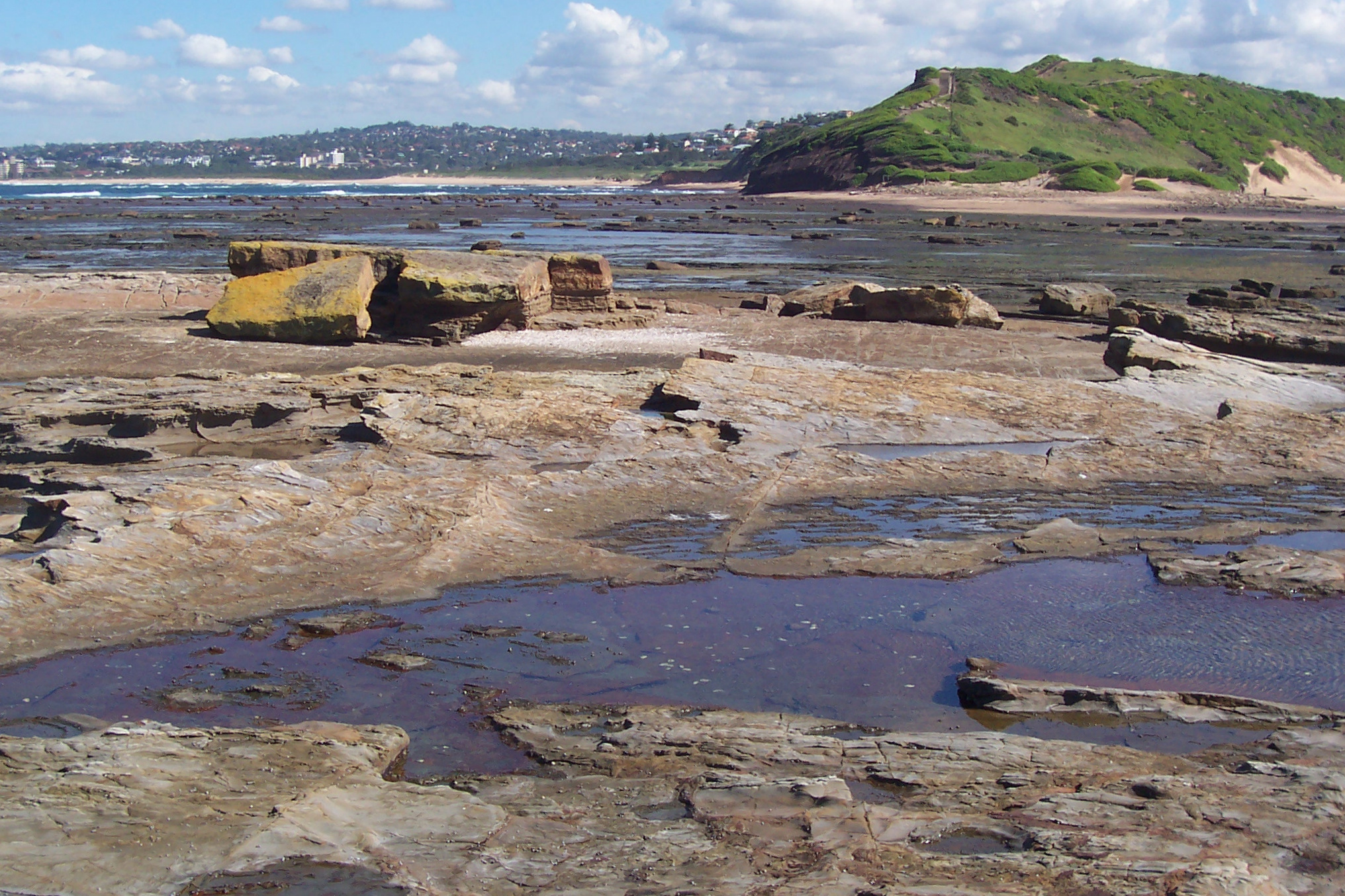
Wave-cut platform at Long Reef

Some of the oldest rocks in the Sydney area may be seen at Long Reef. Primarily from the Triassic they are from the Narrabeen Group of sedimentary rocks. The cliffs of Long Reef are composed of Bald Hill Claystone above Bulgo Sandstone. There was a 60 centimetres (24 in) wide volcanic dyke made of dolerite, two metres tall from the Jurassic. However, this has been reduced by mining. The most commonly seen type of rock in Sydney, Hawkesbury sandstone, is absent at Long Reef. It is present at Dee Why headland, a small distance to the south, separated by a fault under Dee Why beach.

A copper mine was active at Long Reef in the 1880s, after a tunnel was drilled on the southern side. A beach is formed under the cliffs and above the rock platform, with layers of shells and dark minerals. Beach sands include the minerals Ilmenite, rutile, zircon and monazite. The cliffs have evidence of ironstone and laterite, with fallen boulders of the iron rich haematite. Perched water tables produce a number of small freshwater springs on the cliff face. Evidence of faults and folding can be seen at Long Reef. The highest point of Long Reef is composed of Newport Formation sandstone which overlies the Garie Formation.

=== Fossils ===
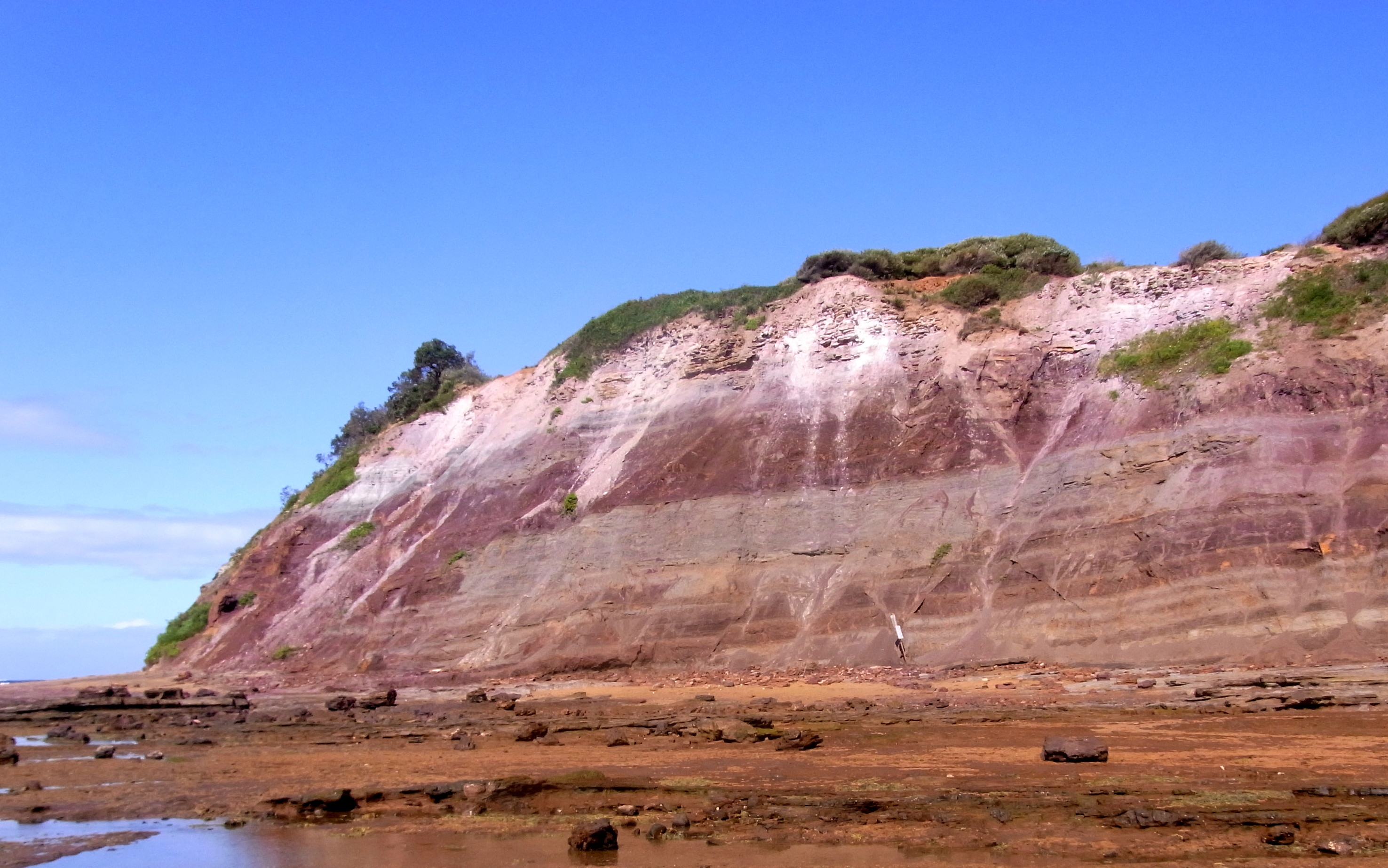
Bald Hill Claystone

Extensive rock-falls of grey claystone are found below the cliff face on the southern side. These rocks often contain plant fossils, the commonest being the horsetail, Phyllotheca. Less often, fossils of a shrub-like seed fern (Dicroidium) may be found.

In 1986, part of a fossilized mandible (jawbone) of a giant labyrinthodontian amphibian was discovered on Long Reef within the Bulgo sandstone. The complete mandible is estimated to have measured around 1 metre (3 ft 3 in) long. The temnospondyl, dated to the Triassic period, was given the name Bulgosuchus gargantua. It is only known from Long Reef.

The original Triassic vegetation is oligotrophic forest.

== History ==
The original human inhabitants were the indigenous Australians, the Kuringgai of the Eora nation. The arrival of white people saw the decimation of the Aboriginals in the late 18th and early 19th century. Their original name of the area is not known. The first white people to set foot in the area were Governor Arthur Phillip and his exploration team, when travelling north to Broken Bay on 22 August 1788. The name "Long Reef" was in use by 1814.

The shipbuilder William Cossar was granted 500 acres (202 hectares) at Long Reef in 1815. A farm of 52 cleared acres at Long Reef was advertised for sale in 1825. One original fisherman's hut remains at Long Reef, it dates from the 1870s. Long Reef was owned by the Salvation Army from 1900 to 1912.

=== Ship incidents ===
Despite the prominent headland, no lighthouse was built here. A number of shipwrecks and maritime incidents occurred at Long Reef, including the sinking of the Windsor in 1816, the Susannah Cuthbert in 1875, the Greyhound in 1904, the steamer Duckenfield which sank in 1889, and the Sylphide, a barque which sunk off Long Reef in 1877. In the 1970s and 1980s many vessels were intentionally scuttled off Long Reef for the formation of artificial reefs. Prominent among these were the Manly ferries, Dee Why and Bellubera. Others include the 50-metre-long bucket-dredge Coolooli, the tug boats Meggol and Himma and HMAS Doomba. There is a record of 25 shipwrecks and scuttlings associated with Long Reef on the Australian National Shipwreck Database (Note: The source is a database. To retrieve the list of ships, select "New South Wales" for the State/Territory field and type "Long Reef" in the "Where lost" field, then click the "Search" button at the bottom. In the list of ships that appears, click on the individual ship names to see the cause of sinking.) (not including some of those listed above).

==== SS Collaroy ====
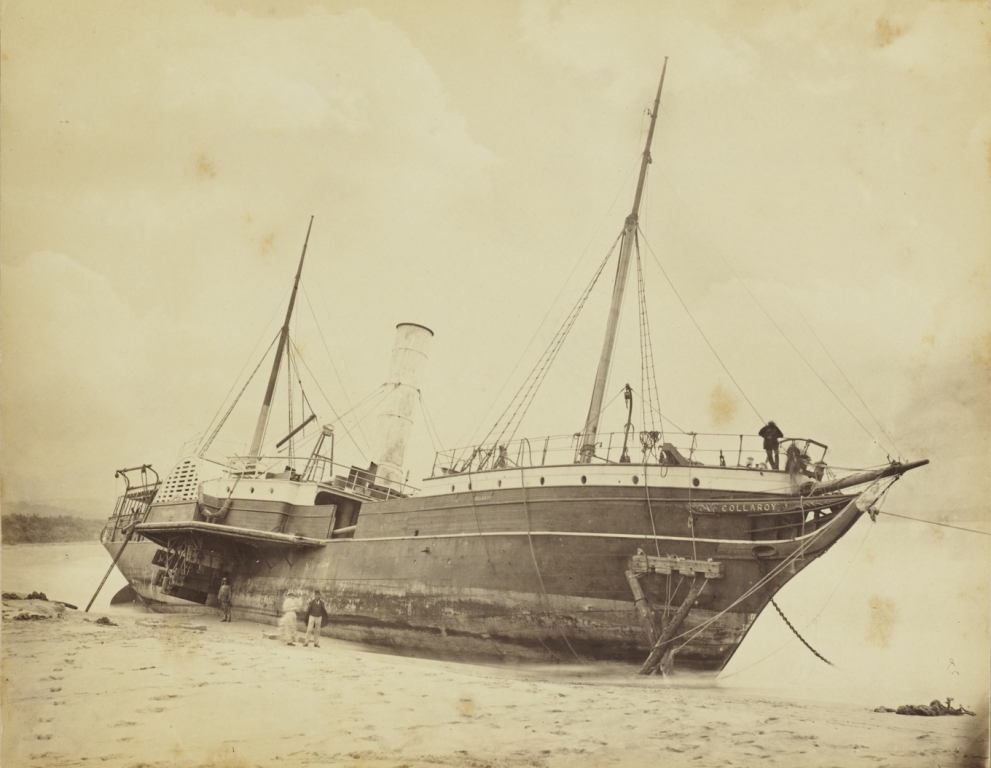
The stranded SS Collaroy, circa 1881

In 1881, the paddle steamer SS Collaroy, bound for Sydney from Newcastle, changed course in a fog and beached near Long Reef. The ship's mate and ship's master lost their certificates for three months over the incident. The ship was stranded for three years, the wreck giving the name to the Sydney suburb Collaroy. The ship was eventually returned to service, until being wrecked at Eureka Point, California in July 1889.

==== Myola shipwreck ====
SS Myola was a 655-ton screw steamer, 55 metres long, built in Middlesbrough in the United Kingdom. Myola left Newcastle on 1 April 1919 bound for Sydney with a cargo of 675 tons of coal. Off Long Reef, the ship was hit by a large wave and the collier sank. Four miles behind, the steamer South Bulli observed distress flares and assisted in picking up survivors. However, four lives were lost. The wreck of Myola was found off Long Reef in 1994 in 48 metres of water, lying on its port side.

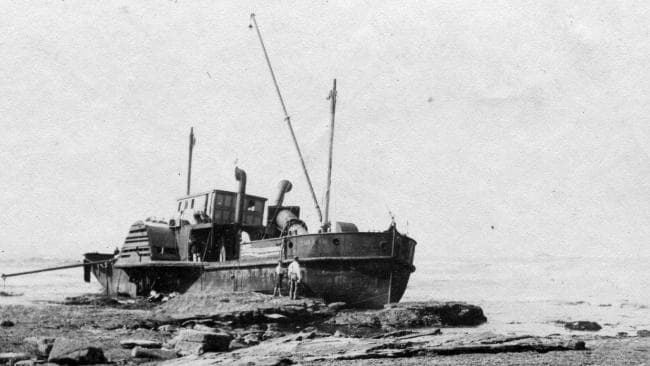
SS Euroka at Long Reef

==== Euroka ====
The 170 ton iron paddle steamer SS Euroka traveled south in 1913 with a cargo of coal loaded at Lake Macquarie. On the voyage to Sydney the steamer ran aground several times. The ship took on water, and captain Benton abandoned the ship at 5pm on 19 October 1913. Eventually, Euroka ran aground in five metres of water at Long Reef with no loss of life. The wreck of Euroka was sold for £155. Salvaged parts of the ship were removed and sold. Eventually the remains of the vessel were abandoned, and broke up in a wide area. In May 1915, a salvage crew dived on the wreck. They found the wreck of another vessel, another collier, Susannah Cuthbert, which ran aground on the reef on 7 July 1875.

== Recreation and facilities ==
Many opportunities exist for recreation at Long Reef. Walking, surfing, swimming, fishing, snorkeling wind surfing, aeromodelling, hang-gliding and exploration of the rock platform at low tide are popular.

Many thousands of school students have visited Long Reef on school excursions. The Long Reef Golf Club was formed in 1921. Public facilities include a viewing platform, public toilets, showers, picnic areas, electric barbecues and a kiosk. Free parking can be difficult on busy days.

=== Scuba diving and fish ===
Scuba diving occurs at "the wall", a 200 metres (660 ft) long underwater structure. At "the cathedral", two sloping rocks form an open cave resembling a church. "The apartments", with stacked horizontal rocks, allow swim-throughs. The wall is populated by many species of fish, including bull rays, blue devils, snapper, yellowtail kingfish, blue groper, Port Jackson sharks, red morwong, wobbegong, large cuttlefish and the rare grey nurse shark. Large shoals of small fish are also frequently seen in this area, including pomfret, yellowtails and bullseyes.

== Birds and sea life ==
Long Reef is an important site for many species of migratory shorebirds. Sea birds uncommonly seen in Sydney include the Ruddy turnstone, Bar-tailed godwit, Grey-tailed tattler, Red-necked stint, Black-browed albatross, Little penguin, Sooty oystercatcher, Osprey, Antarctic prion, Red-tailed tropicbird, Double-banded plover and the Pacific golden plover.

A variety of invertebrates live on the reef, some of which may be spotted at low tide. They include sea anemones, barnacles, limpets, chitons, gastropods including cowries, blue-ringed octopus, nudibranchs, crabs, sea stars, sea urchins, marine worms, cockles, oysters, sea sponges, tube worms, and cunjevoi. Weedy seadragons can be observed by divers. Large areas of Neptune's necklace grow on the reef.

=== Intertidal rock pools ===
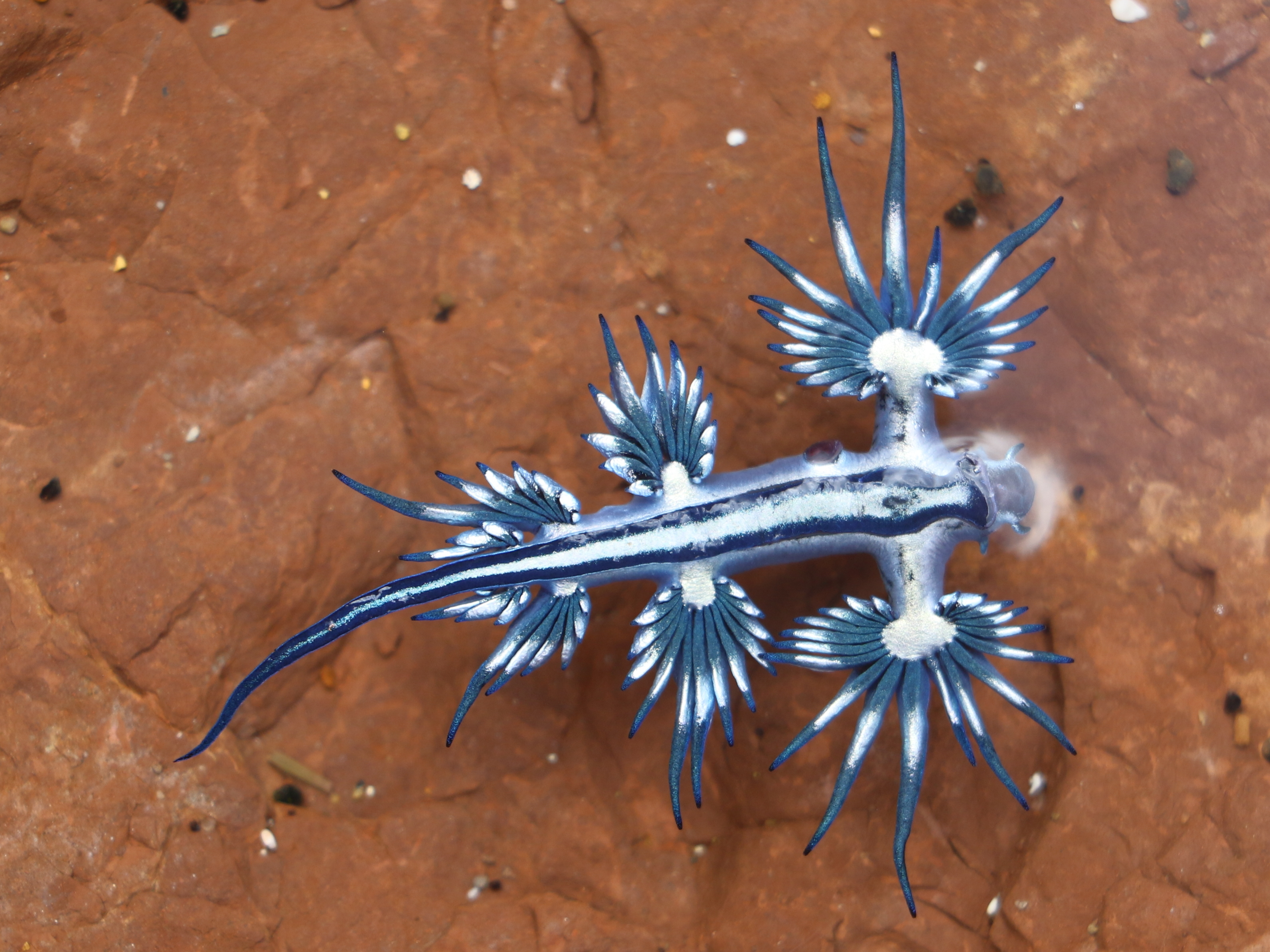
Blue angel at a rock pool, just south of the Long Reef headland

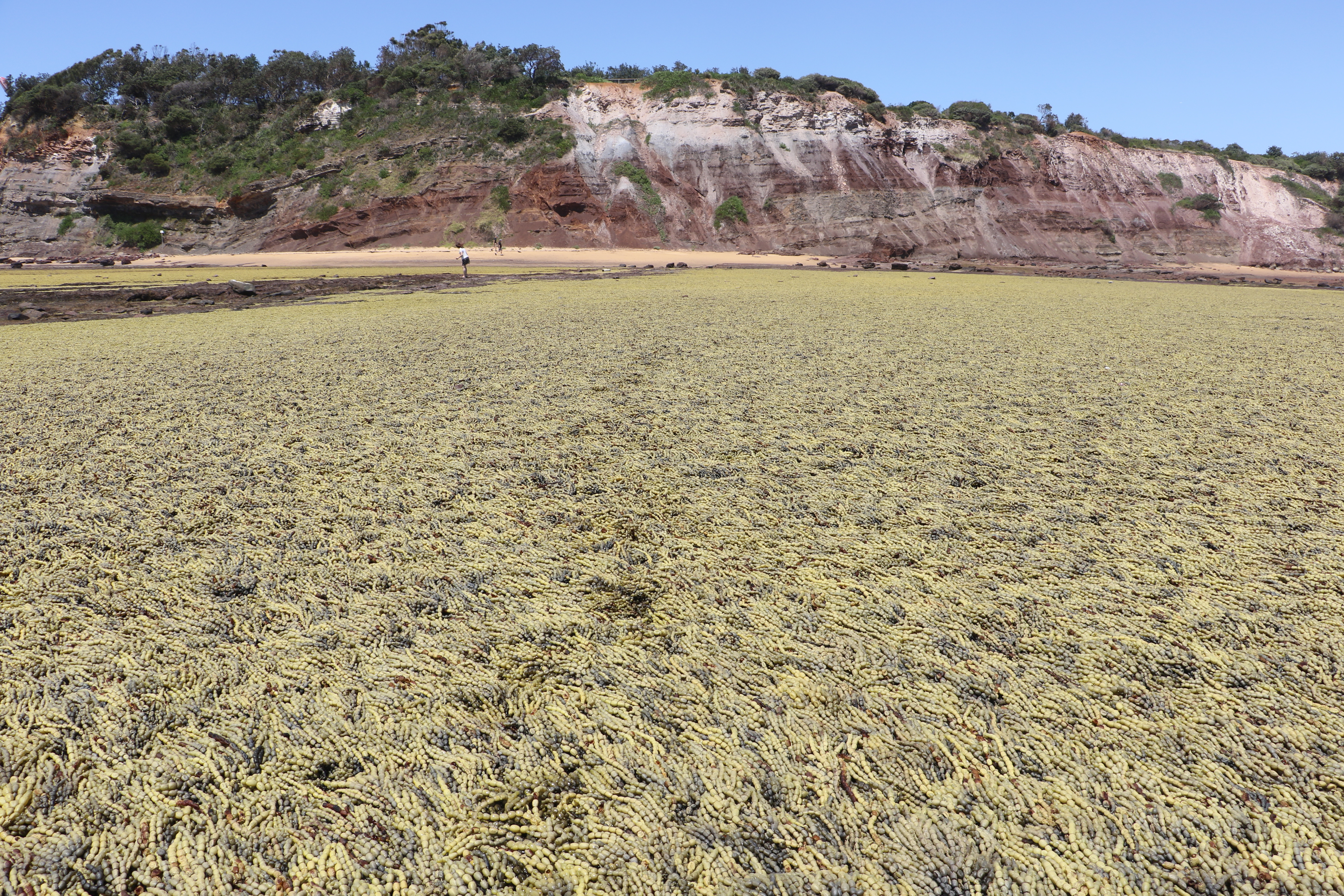
High densities of Hormosira within the intertidal zone at Long Reef

Tide pools at Long Reef contain a variety of organisms. Neptune's necklace (Hormosira banksii) is abundant in and around the rock pools. Sea grasses include Zostera capricorni.

Molluscs include the little blue periwinkle, pyramid periwinkle, black nerite, southern periwinkle, zebra top, limpet, false limpet, mulberry whelk, snakehead cowry, cart-wheel, striped-mouth conniwink, lightning turban, military turban, boat shell, blue angel, black-lip abalone and various types of chiton. The blue-ringed octopus is a dangerous resident of rock pools. Occasionally the gloomy octopus will be found in a larger pool. The banded periwinkle may be seen in the splash zone in rock cracks above the rock pools. Another mollusc found in the pools is Thylacodes sipho, known as a "worm shell".

The waratah anemone and green snake lock are common sea anemones. Others include the white-striped anemone and the red anemone.

Sea urchins include the pink sea urchin, Heliocidaris erythrogramma and Heliocidaris erythrogramma. Sea stars include carpet sea star, velvet sea star, brittle star and the dwarf cushion star.

Galeolaria caespitosa is a common tube worm, sometimes known as "Sydney coral". Crabs include decorator crabs, hermit crabs and the purple rock crab. Barnacles in the inter-tidal zone include the rose barnacle and six sided barnacle.

Fish may be isolated in the rock pools at low tide, such as the smooth toadfish (Tetractenos glaber), juvenile mullet and goby (Favonigobius lateralis).

== Flora and fauna ==
Themeda Grassland was once common at Long Reef, and in recent years efforts have been made to restore it in some areas. There are also areas of heathland and shrubland with coast tea tree, coast rosemary and coast banksia. An invasive species is bitou bush. The grassy area at Long Reef is a declared "Threatened Ecological Community". Bushcare efforts have been made to reduce invasive weeds and encourage local flora and fauna.

Feral foxes and rabbits have been recorded here. Indigenous fauna occurring at Long Reef includes the jacky lizard, blue tongue lizard, bandicoot and ring tail possum. Between 1998 and 2004, tadpoles of the green and gold bell frog were released into specially designed ponds and dams on Long Reef Golf Course. Little success has been recorded. However, other species of frogs live on Long Reef, such as striped marsh frog, eastern froglet, dwarf tree frog and the emerald-spotted tree frog.
