= Mount York Claystone =

Band of sedimentary rocks in the Sydney Basin, Australia

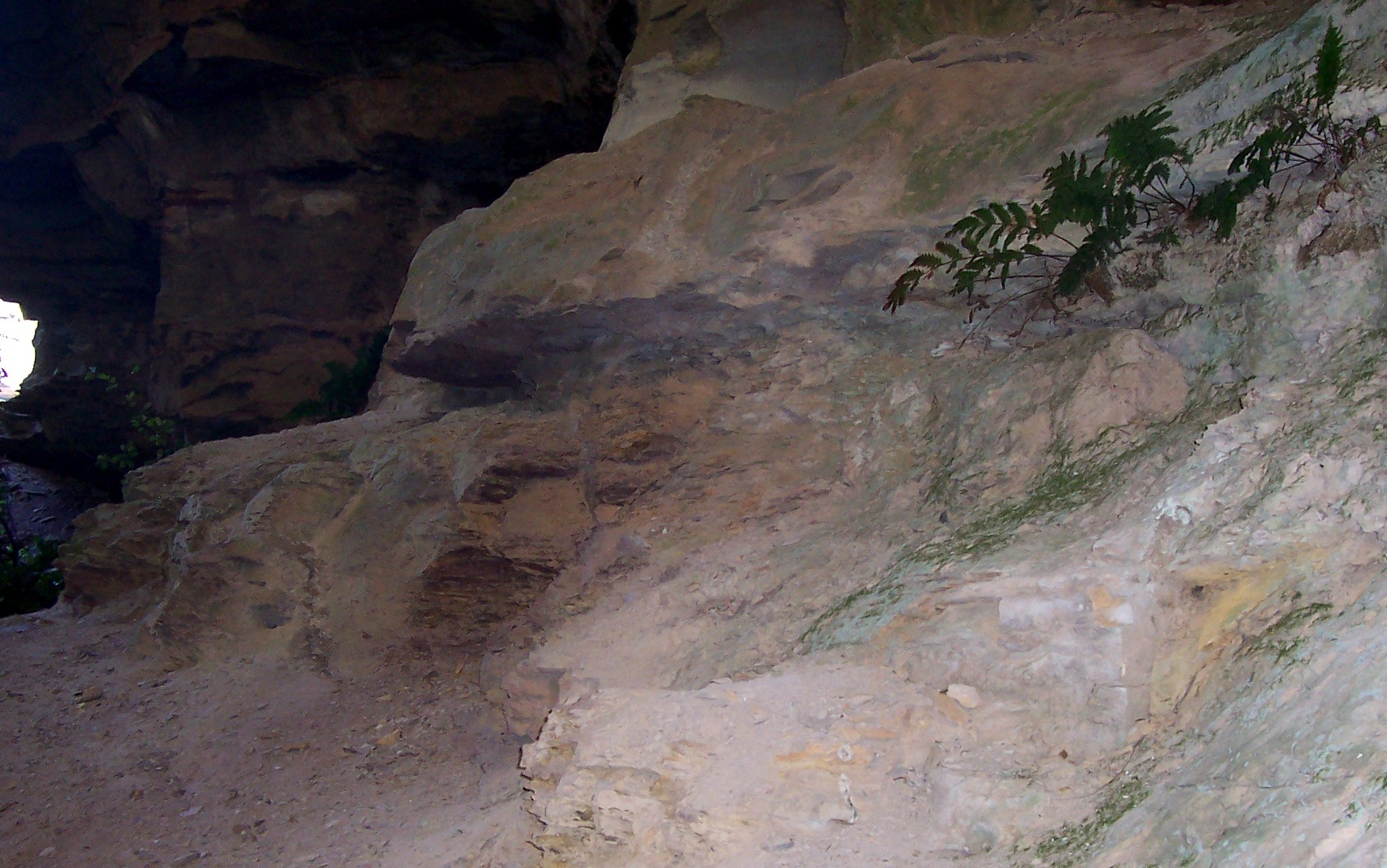
Katoomba, Australia

Mount York Claystone is a narrow band of sedimentary rocks occurring in the Sydney Basin in eastern Australia. This stratum is up to 13 metres thick. Mount York Claystone consists of red brown claystones, of fine‐grained and coarsely oolitic, kaolinite clayrocks.

Often seen situated above the Burra-Moko Head Sandstone and below the Banks Wall Sandstone in the cliffs of the Blue Mountains. The line of strata appears as a vegetated horizontal strip.

Formed in the Triassic, it is part of the Narrabeen Group of sedimentary rocks and has similarities to the Garie Formation.

== See also ==
- Sydney Basin
- Garie Formation
- Bulgo Sandstone
- Narrabeen group
