= Caley Formation =

Band of sedimentary rocks in Australia

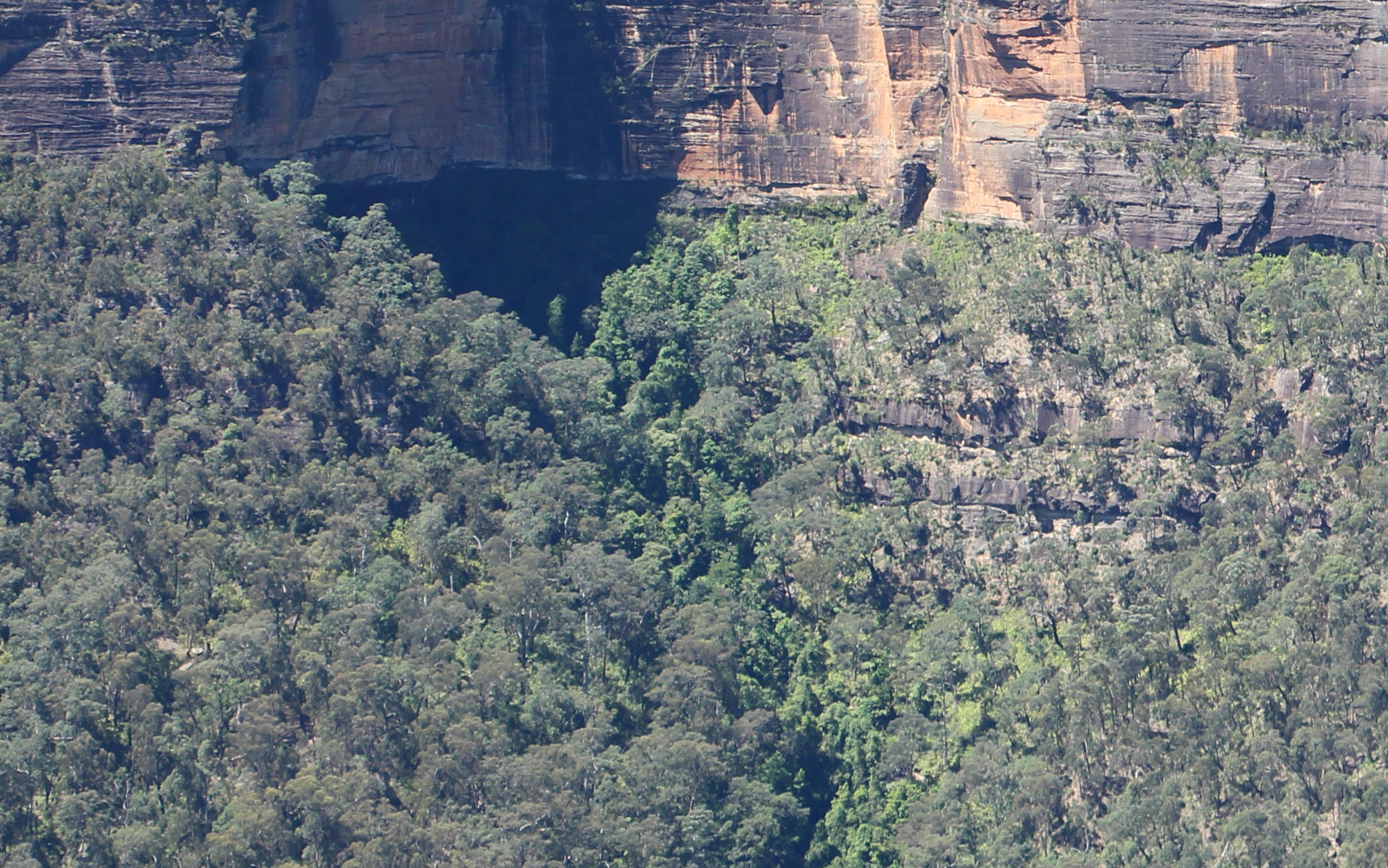
Caley Formation seen below the Burra-Moko Head Sandstone, Grose Valley, Australia

The Caley Formation is a band of sedimentary rocks occurring in the Sydney Basin in eastern Australia. This stratum is up to 46 metres thick. The formation consists of claystone, shale and quartz-lithic sandstone. Often seen situated below the Burra-Moko Head Sandstone in the cliffs of the Blue Mountains.

The formation contains several other members; such as the Beauchamp Falls Shale Member, Clwydd Sandstone Member, Hartley Vale Claystone Member and the Victoria Pass Claystone Member. Formed in the early Triassic, it is part of the Narrabeen Group of sedimentary rocks. Below this formation is the Illawarra Coal Measures from the Permian.

== See also ==
- Sydney Basin
- Burra-Moko Head Sandstone
- Illawarra Coal Measures
- Narrabeen group
