= Wentworth Falls Claystone Member =

Type of rock

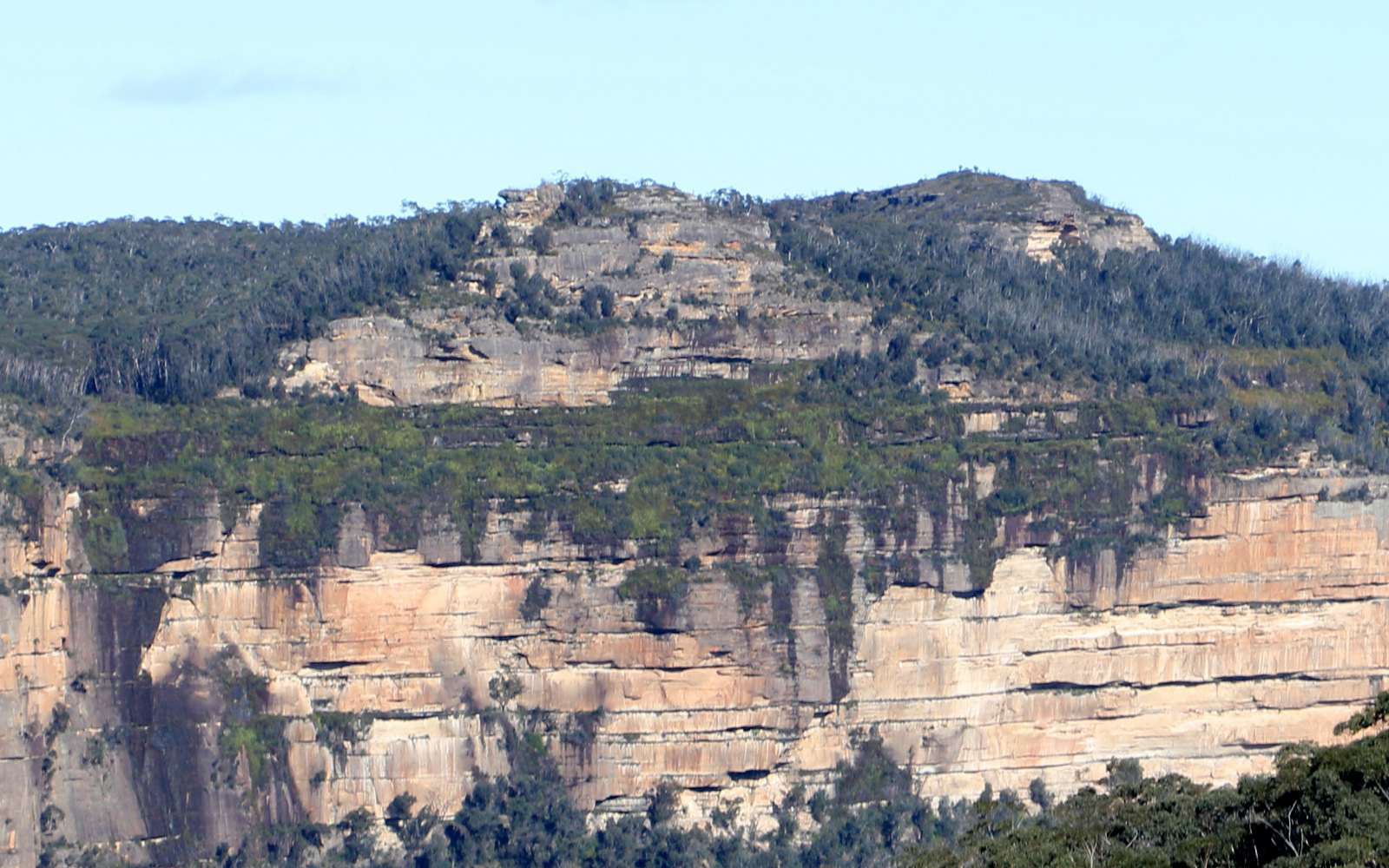
The upper middle green band is Wentworth Falls Claystone Member, at Grose Valley, Australia

Wentworth Falls Claystone Member is a type of sedimentary rock occurring in the Sydney Basin in eastern Australia. This stratum may be seen above the Banks Wall Sandstone in the Blue Mountains, west of Sydney. Part of the Narrabeen Group of Sedimentary Rocks, formed in the Triassic. Wentworth Falls Claystone Member is composed of thick claystone and siltstone red beds.

== See also ==
- Sydney Basin
- Banks Wall Sandstone
- Narrabeen group
