= Long Reef =

Long Reef may refer to:

- Long Reef (New South Wales), a prominent headland in the Northern Beaches of Sydney, Australia
- Longreef, an Australian rock band from Sydney
