= Munmorah Conglomerate =

Geologic formation in New South Wales

- Stratigraphic range: Early-Triassic
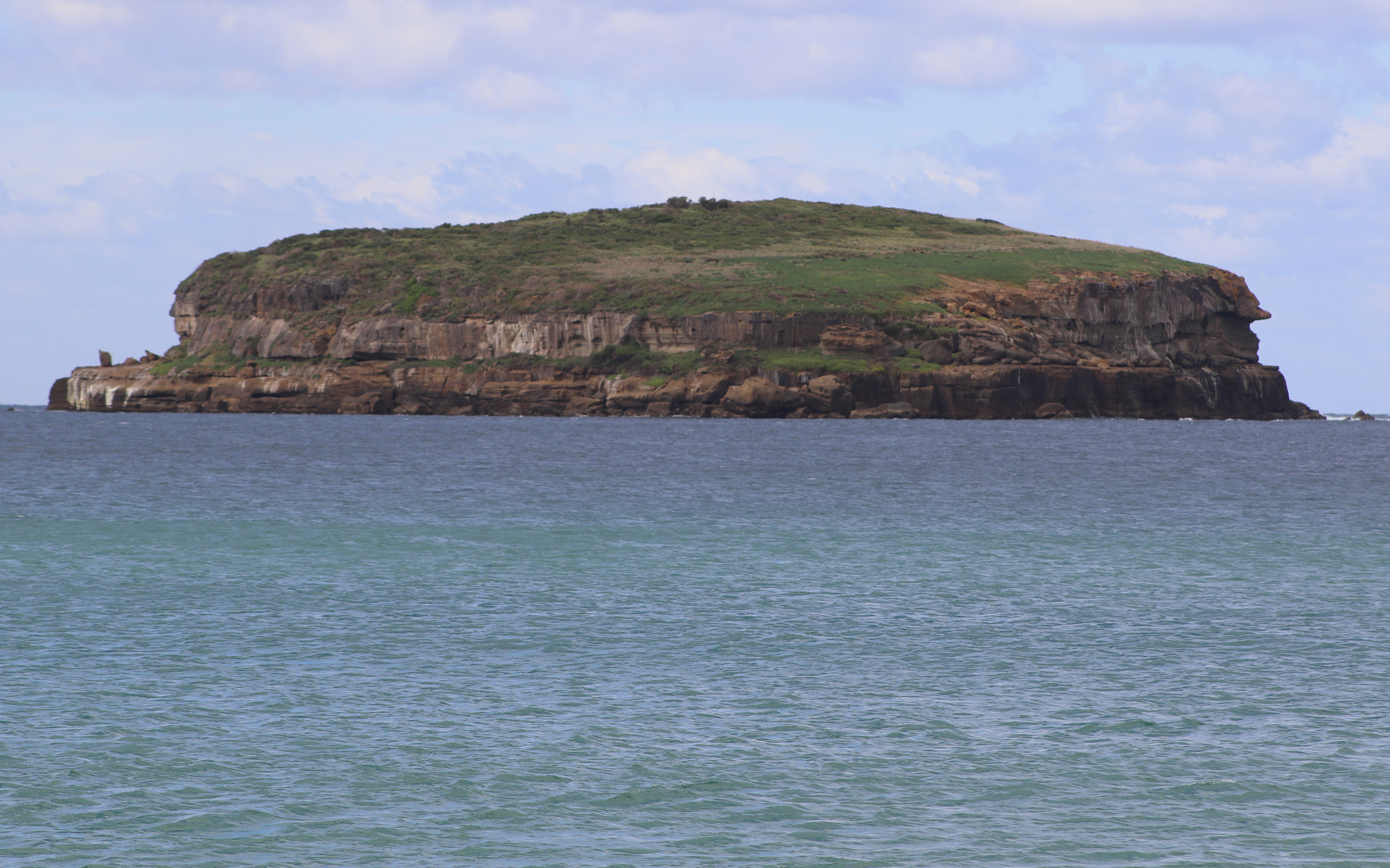
- Bird Island, Central Coast, Australia
- Type: Geological formation
- Unit of: Narrabeen Group
- Overlies: Newcastle Coal Measures
- Thickness: up to 140 metres (460 ft)

Lithology
- Primary: Medium to coarse-grained sandstone and conglomerate
- Other: Minor amounts of siltstone and claystone

Location
- Region: Sydney Basin
- Country: Australia

Munmorah Conglomerate is a geologic formation in the Sydney Basin in eastern Australia. This stratum is up to 140 metres thick. Formed in the early-Triassic, it is part of the Narrabeen Group of sedimentary rocks. This formation includes medium to coarse-grained sandstone and conglomerate. With minor amounts of siltstone and claystone. Below the Munmorah Conglomerates are Newcastle Coal Measures, originating from the Permian.

== See also ==
- Sydney Basin
- Terrigal Formation
- Newport Formation
- Narrabeen group
