= Bulgo Sandstone =

Geologic formation in Australia

- Stratigraphic range: Olenekian
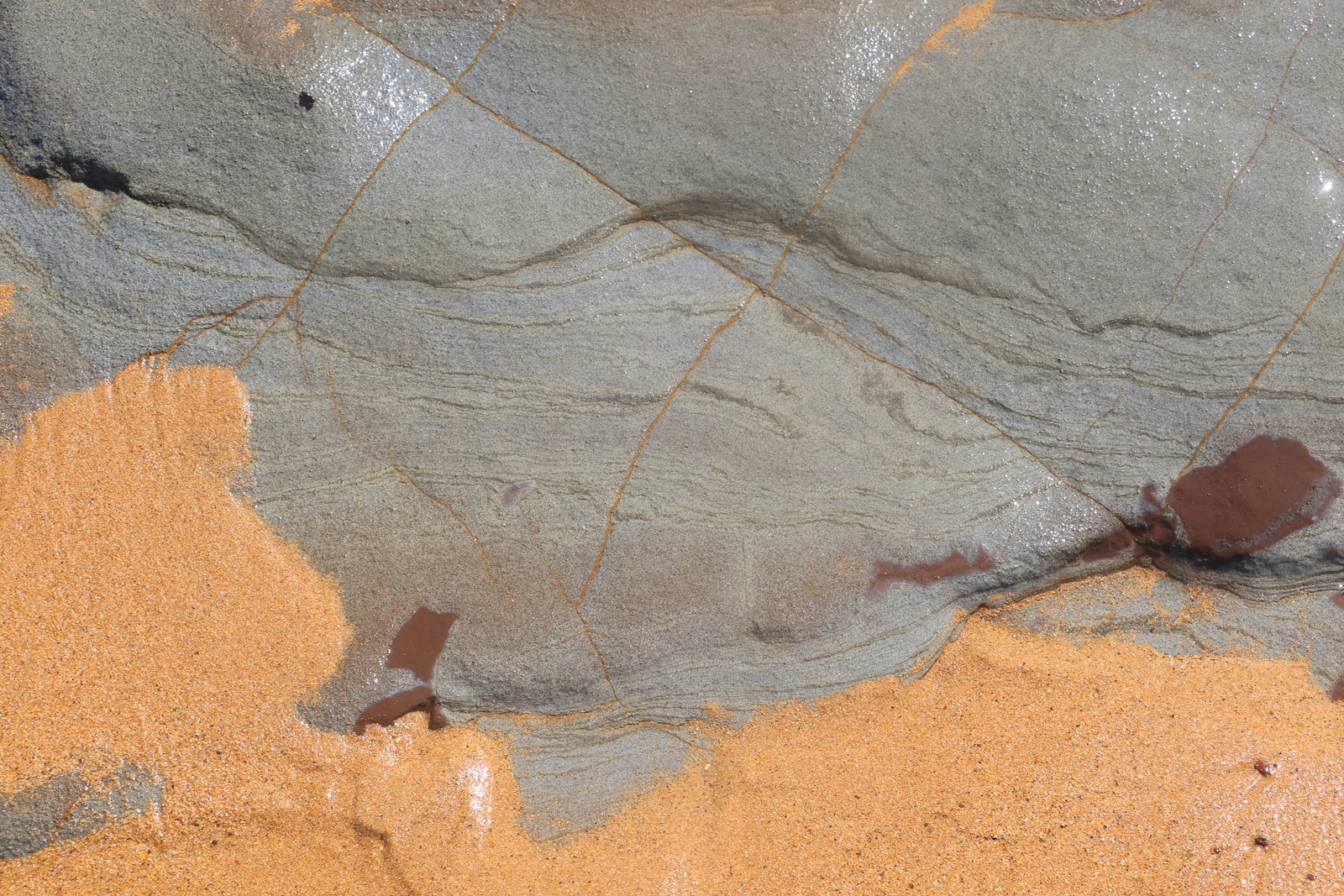
- Outcrop of the Bulgo Sandstone at Long Reef in New South Wales
- Type: Geological formation
- Unit of: Narrabeen Group
- Underlies: Bald Hill Claystone
- Thickness: up to 100 metres (330 ft)

Location
- Location: Sydney Basin
- Country: Australia
- Extent: Sydney

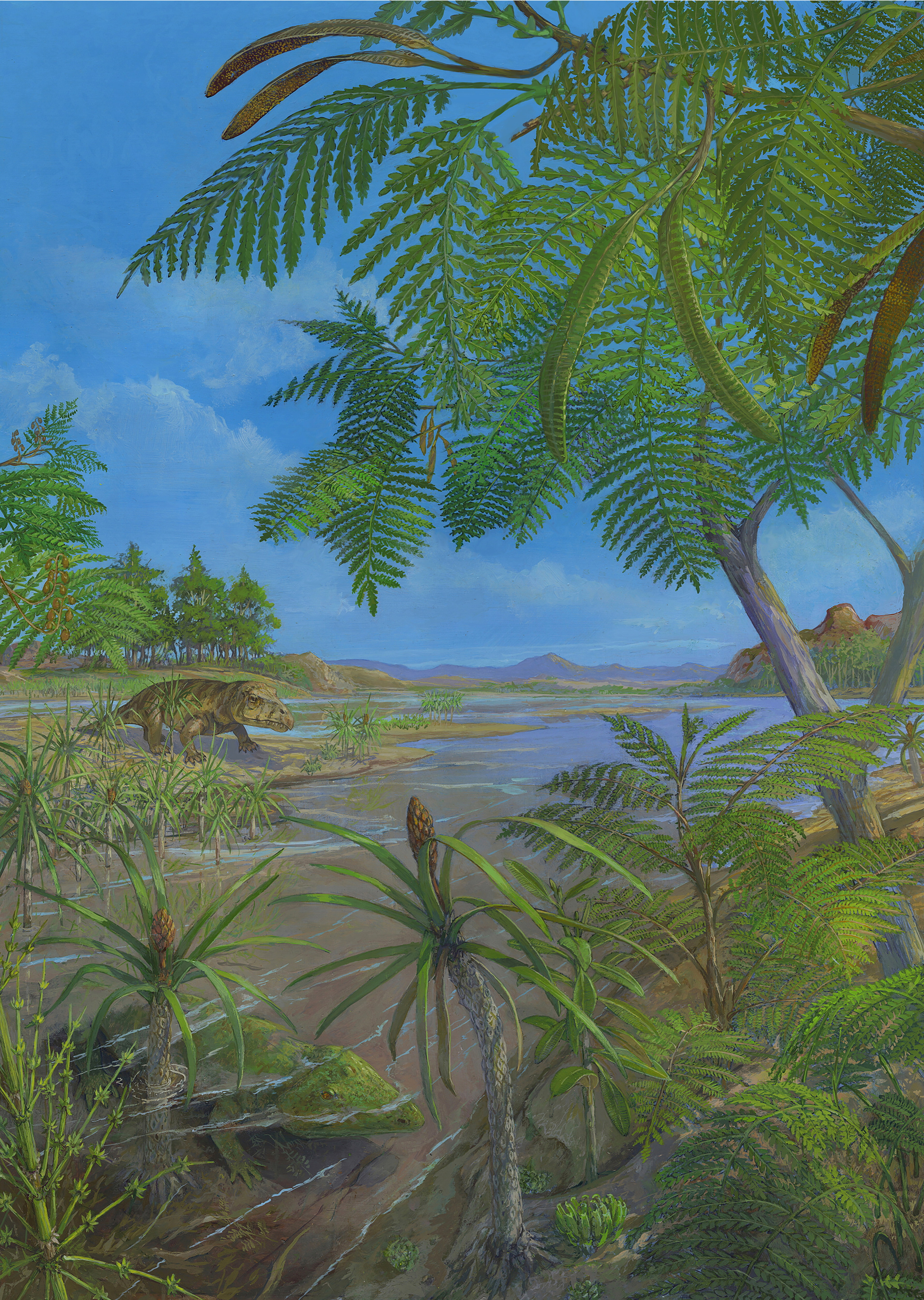
Paleoenvironmetal reconstruction, including Dicroidium tree (top right), Pleuromeia (centre foreground) Bulgosuchus (right foreground) and a proterosuchid (right background). Art by Michael Rothman

Bulgo Sandstone is a sedimentary rock occurring in the Sydney Basin in eastern Australia. This stratum is up to 100 metres thick, formed in the early Triassic (Olenekian). A component of the Narrabeen Group of sedimentary rocks. It consists of layers of fine to medium-grained quartz-lithic sandstone, with lenticular shale interbeds.

Often seen as a grey-green colour when exposed, the Bulgo sandstone contains a high level of particles of volcanic rocks, and is dissimilar to other Sydney sandstones, such as Hawkesbury sandstone and Newport Formation. The rock breaks down to create a relatively fertile clayey soil. These soils contribute to the rainforest growth in the northern Illawarra. Bulgo sandstone may be seen at the "figure eight" rock pool at Royal National Park and at Long Reef in the northern Beaches in Sydney. A fossil of the giant amphibian Bulgosuchus gargantua was found at Long Reef.

== Paleofauna and paleoflora ==
- Bulgosuchus gargantua - Mandible and femur.
- Capitosauria indet. - Isolated remains.
- Dicroidium - Abundant remains.
- Non-teleost fish - Isolated remains.
- Proterosuchidae indet. - Two anterior dorsal vertebrae.

== See also ==
- Sydney Basin
- Bald Hill Claystone
- Garie Formation
- Narrabeen group
