= Burra-Moko Head Sandstone =

Geologic formation in Australia

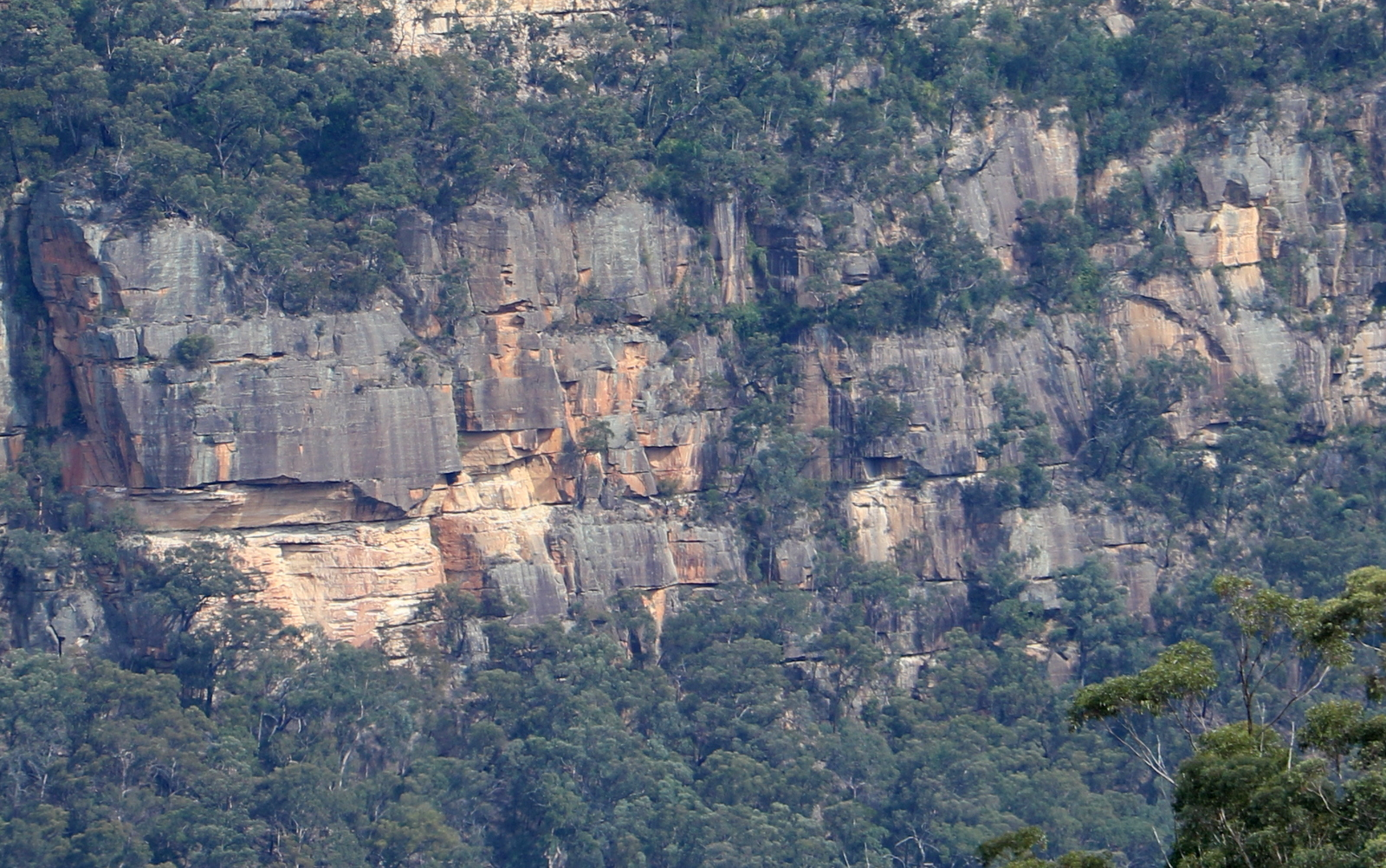
Grose Valley, Australia

Burra-Moko Head Sandstone is a type of sedimentary rock occurring in the Sydney Basin in eastern Australia. This stratum is up to 112 metres thick. The rock is composed of quartzose to quartz lithic sandstone. It is situated below the Mount York Claystone in the Blue Mountains. Formed in the early Triassic, it is part of the Narrabeen Group of sedimentary rocks.

== See also ==
- Sydney Basin
- Banks Wall Sandstone
- Blue Mountains Basalts
- Mount York Claystone
- Narrabeen group
