= Bald Hill Claystone =

Geologic formation in Australia

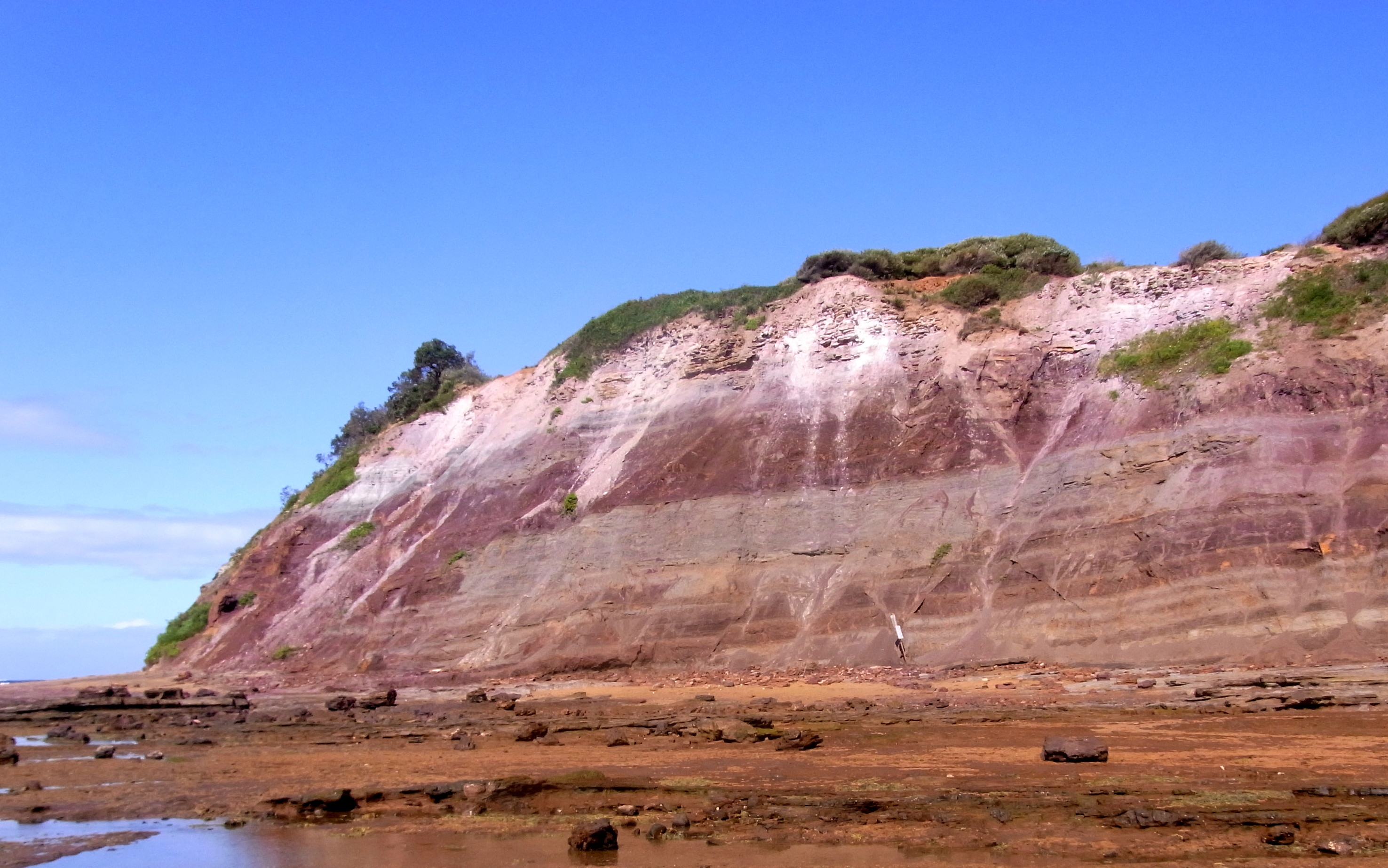
Bald Hill Claystone at Long Reef (New South Wales), Australia

Bald Hill Claystone is a sedimentary rock found in the Sydney Basin in eastern Australia. It is part of the Clifton sub-group of the Narrabeen Group of sedimentary rocks. It was formed by weathering of the Gerringong Volcanics in the early Triassic. Named after Bald Hill, in the northern Illawarra, where it is 15 metres thick. The claystone is easily noticed at Long Reef, where it is 18 metres thick.

== Mineralogy ==
The Bald Hill Claystone is a redbed containing laterite. Primarily a red shale or fine to medium grained sandstone. Kaolinite is found in proportions of 50% to over 75%. Iron rich haematite is also present. Felspar and quartz may be present. This mineralogy indicates that Bald Hill Claystone is unlikely to swell. Typically this rock type is a chocolate brown to red brown colour, with bands of silty grey, or sandy greenish grey.

== Fossils ==
Fossils of lycopod tree roots may be seen in this strata. Gymnosperm spore pollen from Protohaploxypinus samoilovichii has also been recorded.

== See also ==
- Sydney Basin
- Hawkesbury sandstone
- Ashfield Shale
- Narrabeen group
- Garie Formation
- Bulgo Sandstone
