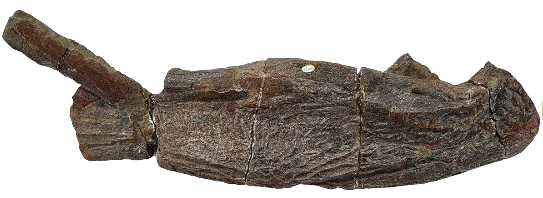
- Holotype mandible of B. gargantua

Scientific classification
- Kingdom: Animalia
- Phylum: Chordata
- Clade: Tetrapoda
- Order: †Temnospondyli
- Suborder: †Stereospondyli
- Clade: †Capitosauria
- Family: †Mastodonsauridae
- Genus: †Bulgosuchus; Damiani, 1999
- Species: †B. gargantua

Binomial name
- †Bulgosuchus gargantua Damiani, 1999

= Bulgosuchus =

Bulgosuchus Temporal range: Early Triassic, Olenekian

Extinct genus of amphibians

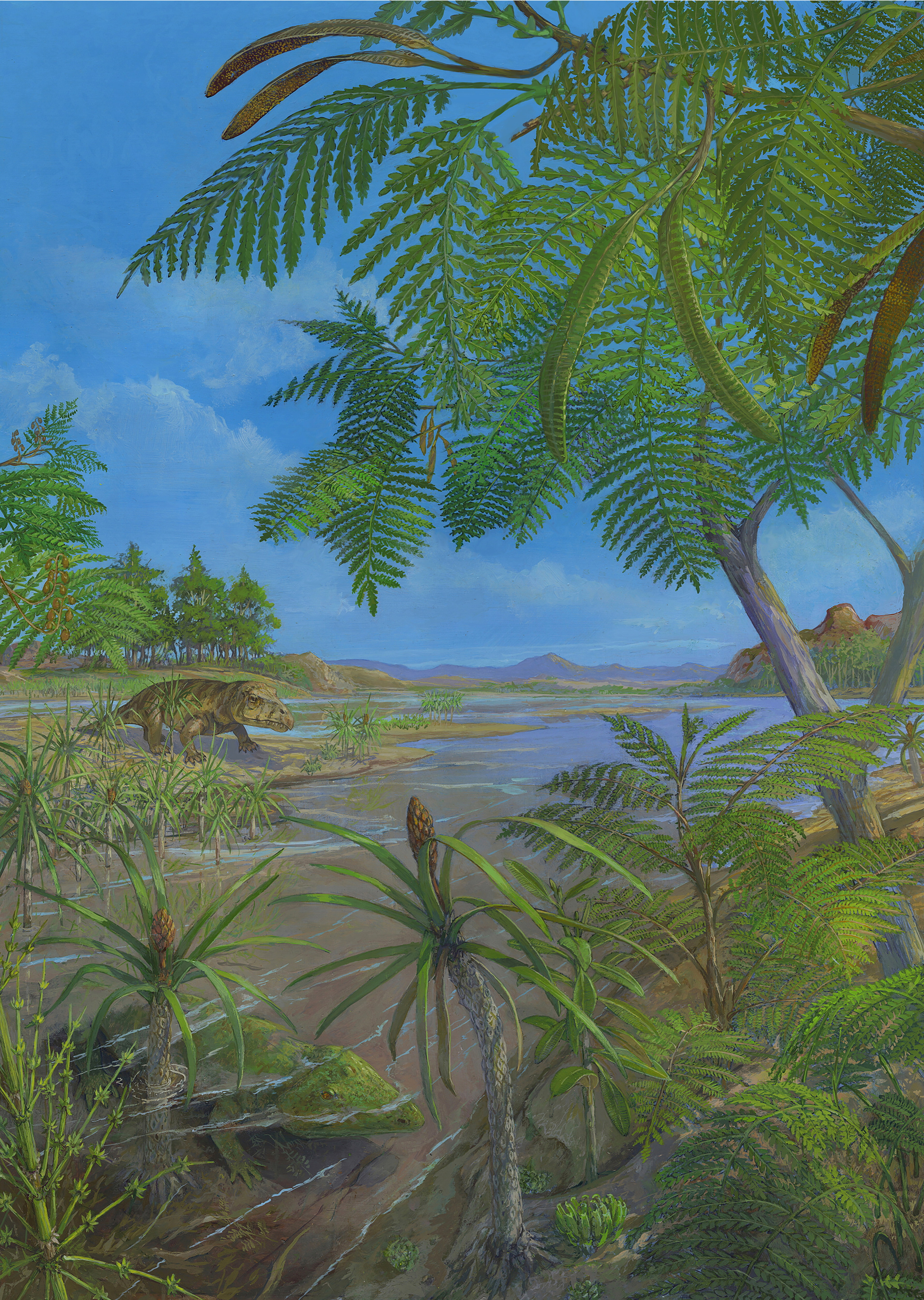
Life reconstruction (left foreground) in an Early Triassic landscape, art by Michael Rothman

Bulgosuchus is an extinct genus of prehistoric amphibians, known from an incomplete mandible and a femur recovered from the Bulgo Sandstone at Long Reef in Sydney, Australia. The type species is Bulgosuchus gargantua, which was named in 1999.

The type specimen is AM F80190, the posterior glenoid section of a left mandibular ramus, and the mandible is estimated to have been at least one metre long.

At the time of discovery, Bulgosuchus was described as the largest known temnospondyl from the Early Triassic.

== See also ==
- Prehistoric amphibian
- List of prehistoric amphibians
