= Narrabeen group =

Sedimentary rocks in New South Wales, Australia

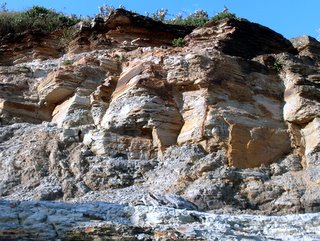
Narrabeen Group of sedimentary rocks at Narrabeen Headland, Australia

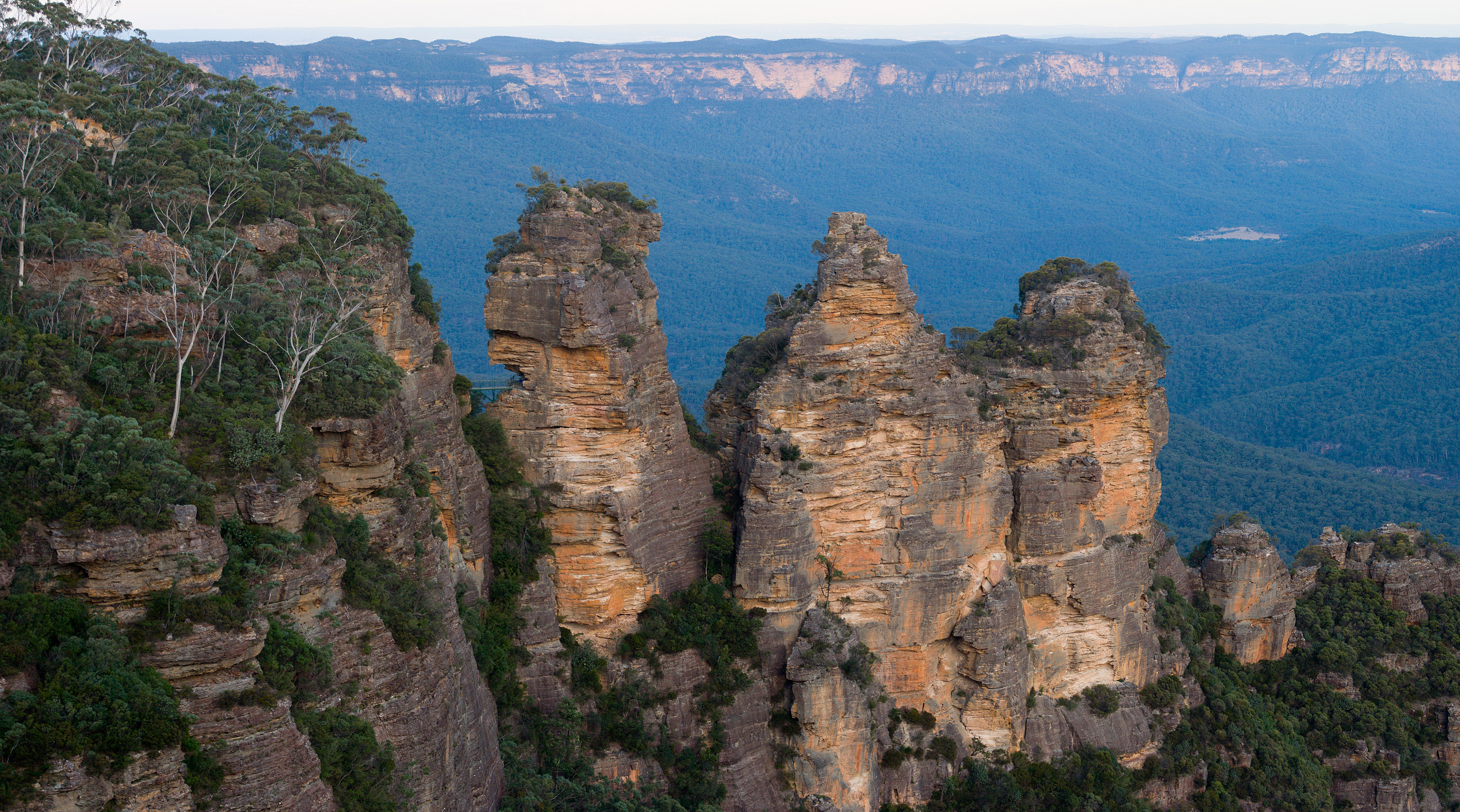
The Three Sisters, made up of rocks of the Narrabeen Group, Blue Mountains.

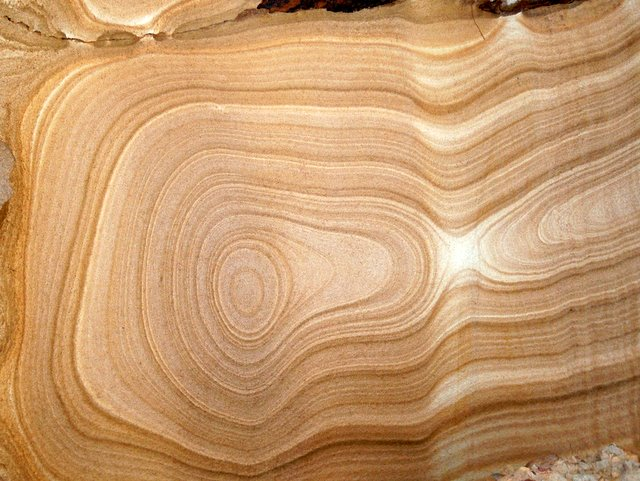
Newport Formation Sandstone at Flint & Steel Beach, Broken Bay

The Narrabeen group of sedimentary rocks occurs in the Sydney Basin in eastern Australia. This series of rocks was formed in the Triassic Period.

== Geology ==
It includes various rock types including lithic sandstone, quartz sandstone, siltstones, claystones, conglomerate and shales, some of which have fossils of plants and fish. Partly in these rocks plants, fish and amphibious animals are petrified. The red and green shales of the Narrabeen Group are water-tight over the sandstone bodies and the shale of Bald Hill, which forms the top layer of the Narrabeen Group, forms a regional water-barrier layer. Over the Narrabeen Group, the younger stratigraphic formation of Hawkesbury sandstones accumulated.

The Narrabeen Group is affected by numerous faults and joint systems, including the Homebush Bay Fault Zone, a major north-northeast-trending fault system that extends for at least 20 kilometres (12 mi) through parts of western and northern Sydney.

== Structure ==
Above the Narrabeen group is the younger less fertile Hawkesbury sandstone. Below are Permian sedimentary rocks including measures of coal broadly known as the Illawarra Coal Measures.

== Whereabouts ==
The Narrabeen group is most famously seen as The Three Sisters in the Blue Mountains. It can also be seen in various places in the Sydney Basin, such as Long Reef near Narrabeen, and at sea level around Broken Bay.

== See also ==
- Bringelly Shale
- Ashfield Shale
- Banks Wall Sandstone
- Burra-Moko Head Sandstone
- Caley Formation
- Mount York Claystone
- Munmorah Conglomerate
- Terrigal Formation
- Newport Formation (NSW)
- Garie Formation
- Bulgo Sandstone
- Bald Hill Claystone
- Scarborough Sandstone
- Wentworth Falls Claystone Member
- Geology of New South Wales
- Geography of Sydney
