= Garie Formation =

Geologic formation in Australia

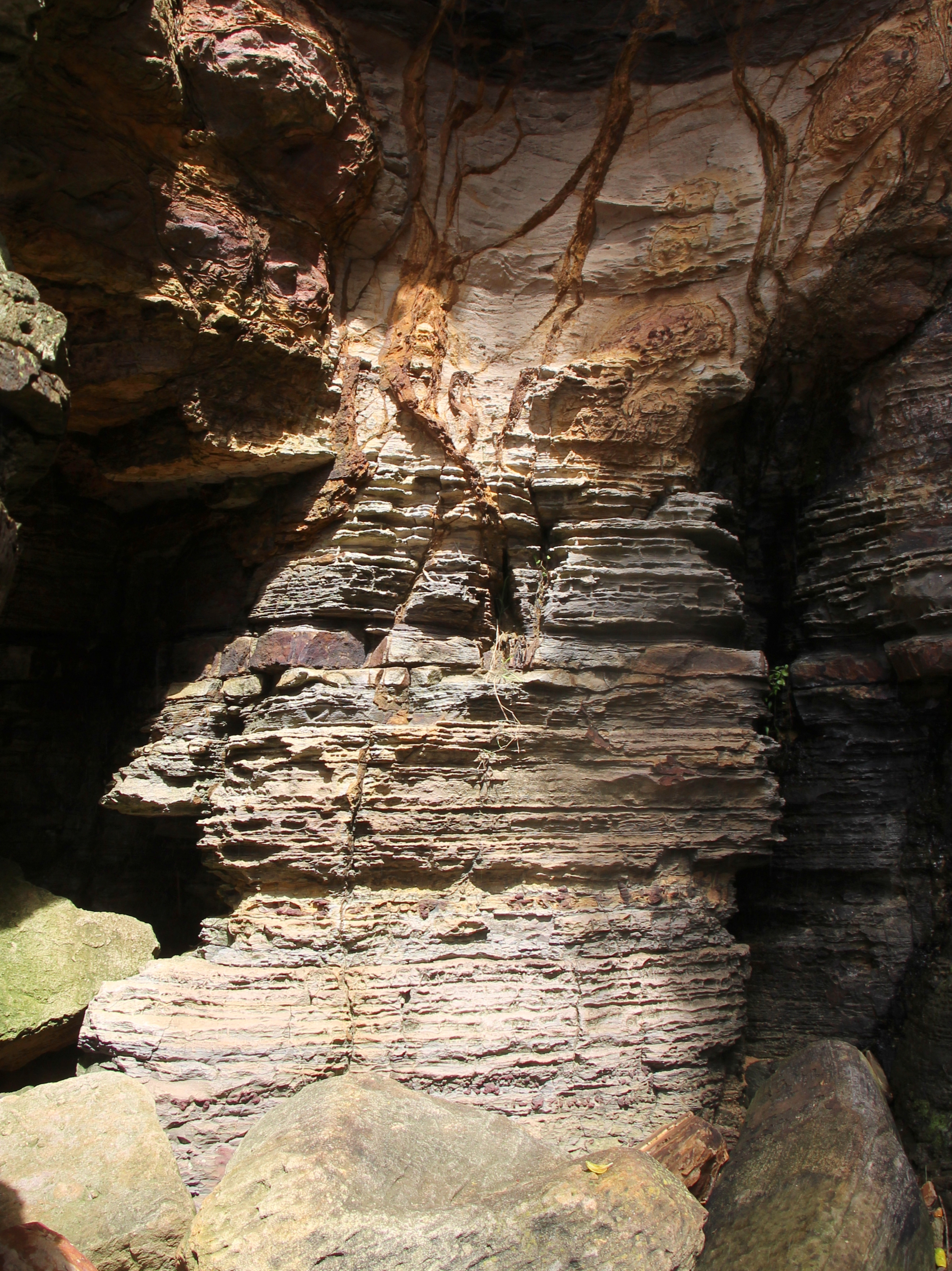
Bilgola, Australia

The Garie Formation is a narrow band of sedimentary rocks occurring in the Sydney Basin in eastern Australia. This stratum is up to 8 metres thick, situated below the sandstones of the Newport Formation. Formed in the mid-Triassic, it is part of the Narrabeen Group of sedimentary rocks. Garie formation consists of layers of clay pellet sandstone, dark lithic particles, spotted volcanic deposits and chocolate coloured claystone bands.

== See also ==
- Sydney Basin
- Bald Hill Claystone
- Bulgo Sandstone
- Narrabeen group
