= Three Sisters (Australia) =

Rock formation in New South Wales, Australia

- Stratigraphic range: Triassic
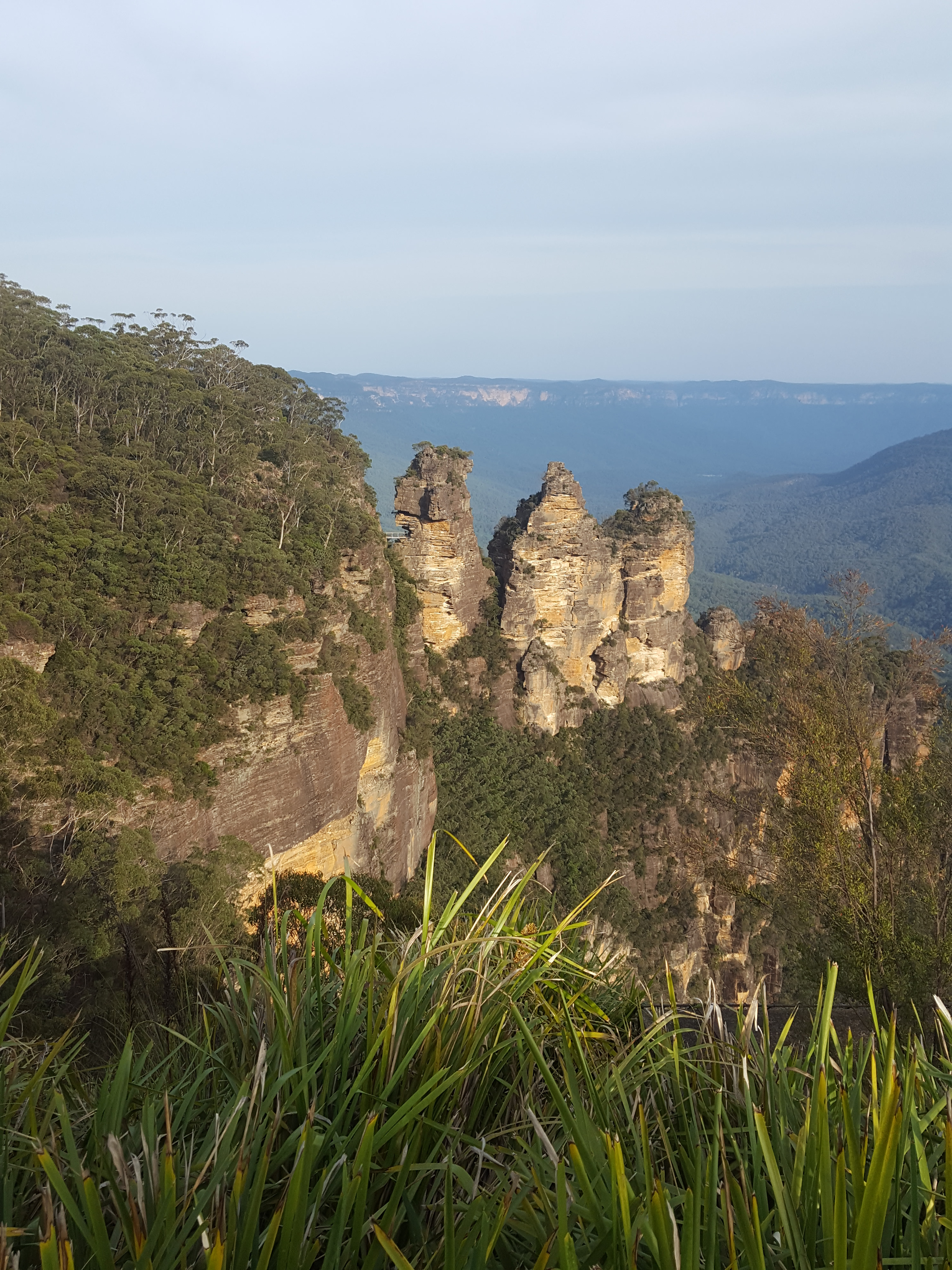
- The Three Sisters towering above the Jamison Valley.
- Type: Rock formation
- Unit of: Great Dividing Range

Lithology
- Primary: Sandstone

Location
- Coordinates: 33°44′8″S 150°18′52″E
- Region: Blue Mountains
- Country: Australia

Type section
- Named for: Indigenous mythology

The Three Sisters are an unusual rock formation in the Blue Mountains of New South Wales, Australia, on the north escarpment of the Jamison Valley. They are located close to the town of Katoomba and are one of the Blue Mountains' best known sites, towering above the Jamison Valley. Their names are Meehni (922 m), Wimlah (918 m), and Gunnedoo (906 m).

The formation receives more than 600,000 visitors per year.

== Formation ==
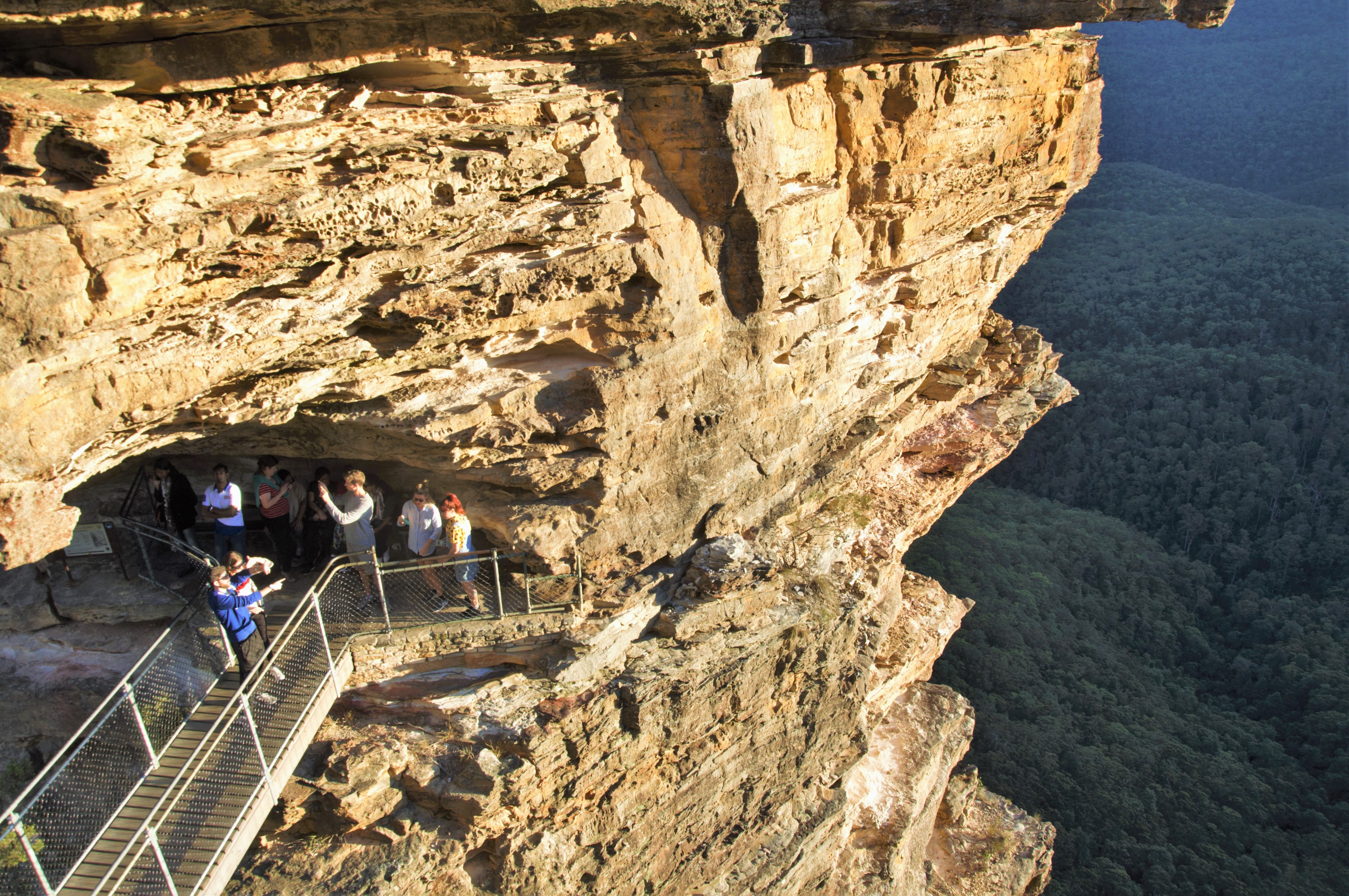
A view of The Three Sisters rock formation alongside Mount Solitary. The lighter coloured orange/yellow sections indicate fresh rock, exposed by recent erosion.

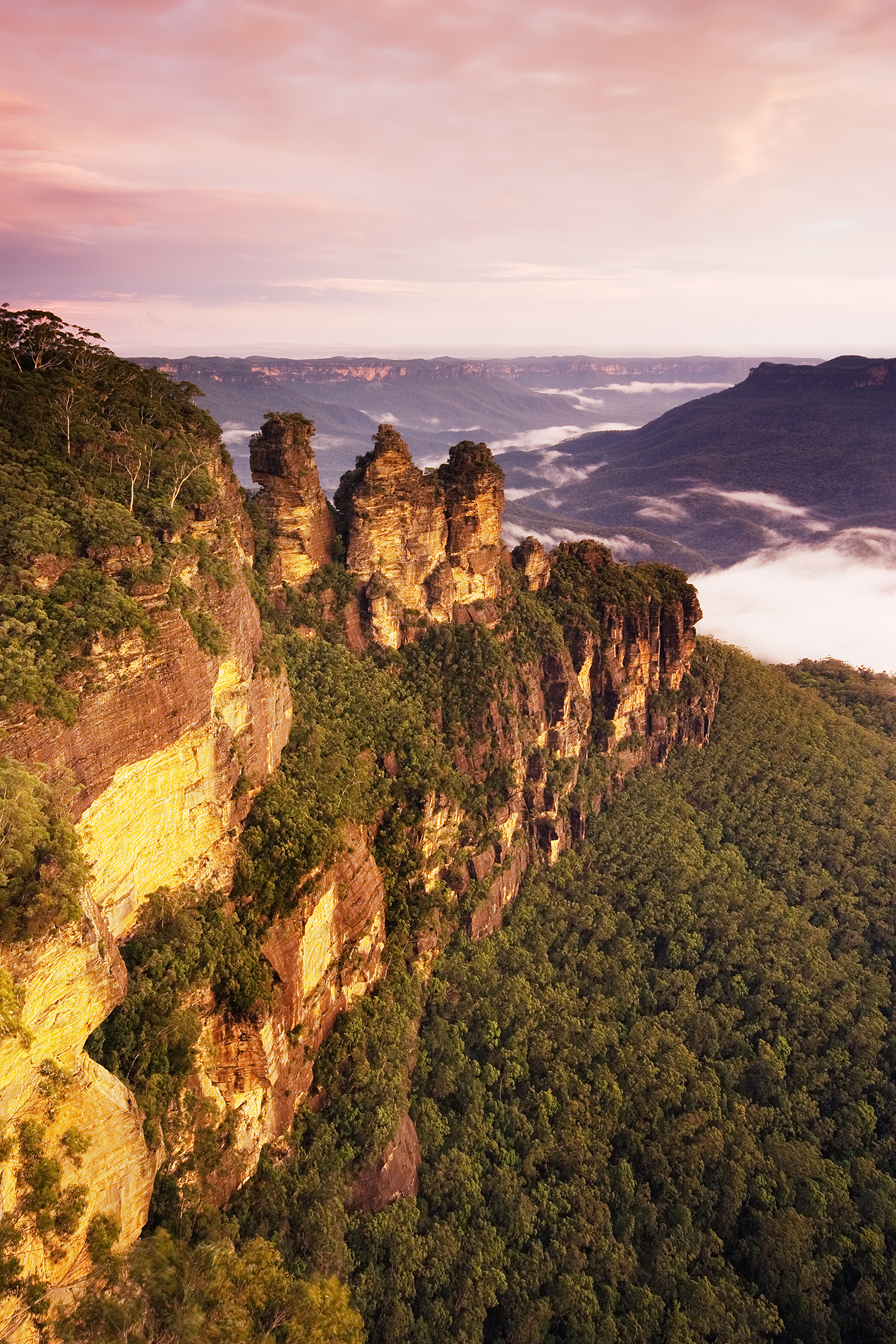
The Three Sisters at sunset

The Three Sisters were formed by land erosion around 200 million years ago during the Triassic period when the sandstone bog, the Blue Mountains, was eroded over time by wind, rain and rivers, causing the cliffs surrounding the Valley to be slowly be broken up.

== Aboriginal Dreamtime Story ==
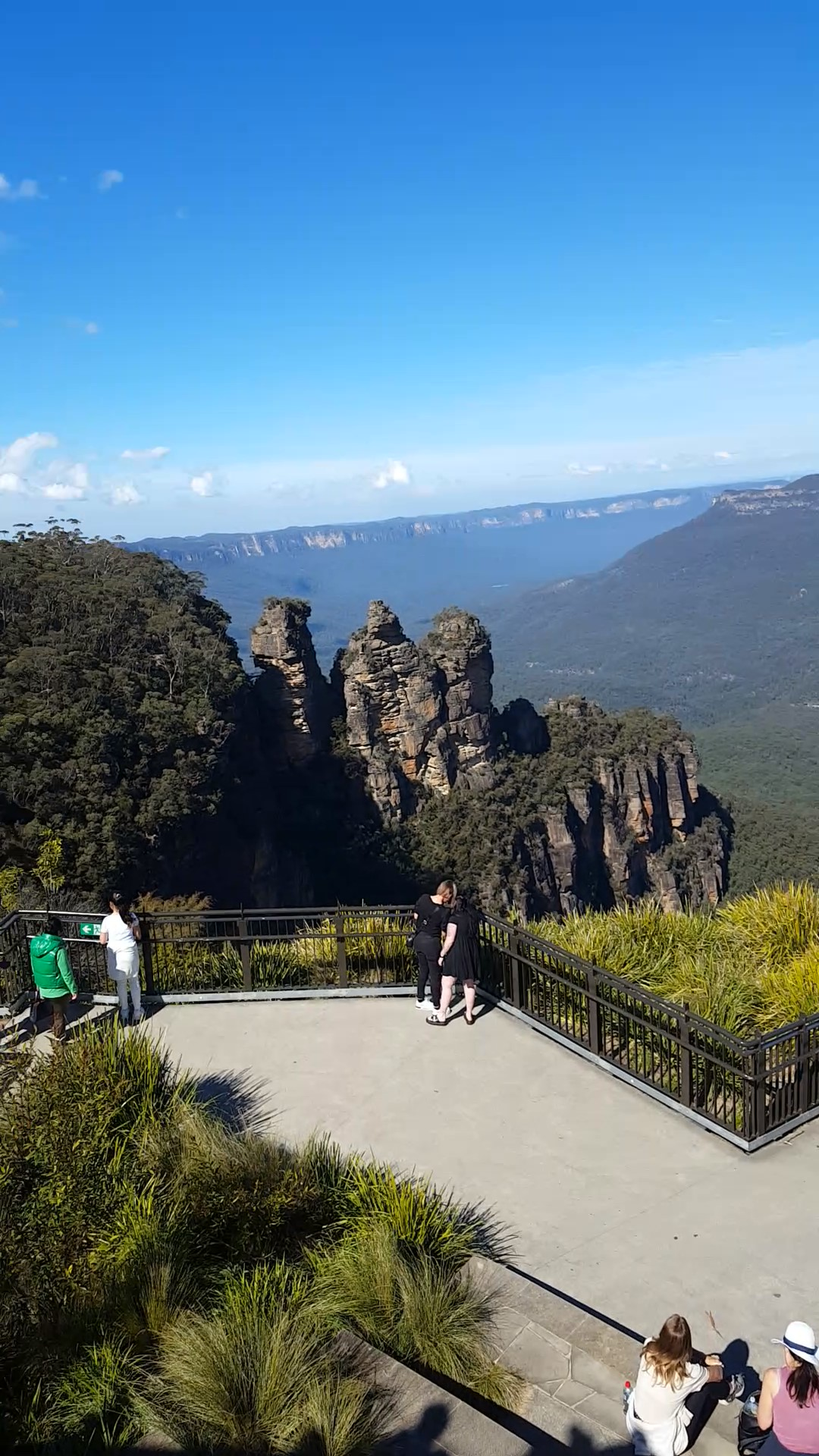
The Three Sisters at morning

The commonly told Dreamtime Story of the Three Sisters is that three sisters, Wimalah, Meeni, and Gunedoo, lived in the Jamison Valley as members of the Katoomba tribe. They fell in love with three men from the neighbouring Nepean tribe, but marriage was forbidden by tribal law. The brothers were not happy to accept this law and so decided to capture the three sisters. A major tribal battle ensued, and the sisters were turned to stone by an elder to protect them, but he was killed in the fighting and no one else could turn them back.

This legend is commonly claimed to be an Indigenous Australian Dreamtime legend. However, the legend as is commonly told may be traced back to non-indigenous 16-year-old schoolgirl Patricia Stone, who gave the formations their "indigenous" names.

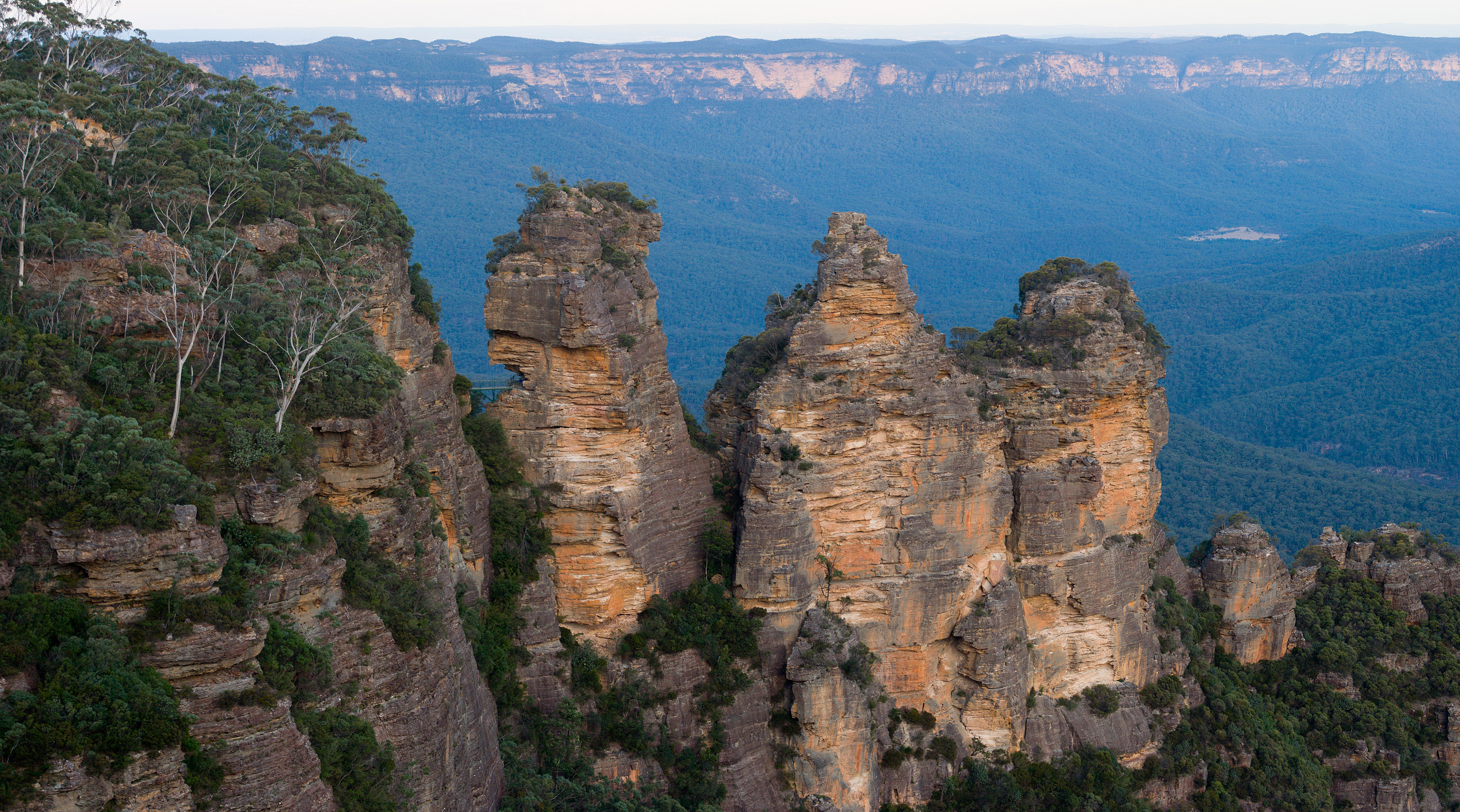
A close-up view of the Three Sisters

The Aboriginal traditional owners, the Gundungurra, have a different legend that includes the Sisters rock formation is a relief to the system.

The Three Sisters were declared an Aboriginal Place in January 2014, making it the 98th place in New South Wales to be declared as such.

== Giant Stairway ==
From nearby Echo Point, a bushwalking trail leads to the Three Sisters and down to the valley floor via 998 steps to the upper lookout called "the Giant Stairway". Then a 1.5-hour walk on The Federal Pass trail leads to the base of Katoomba Falls and the Katoomba Scenic Railway. Walkers who do not wish to climb back to the top can take the Scenic Railway back to the plateau for a fee.

== See also ==
- Jenolan Caves
