= Illawarra Coal Measures =

Group of rocks in Australia

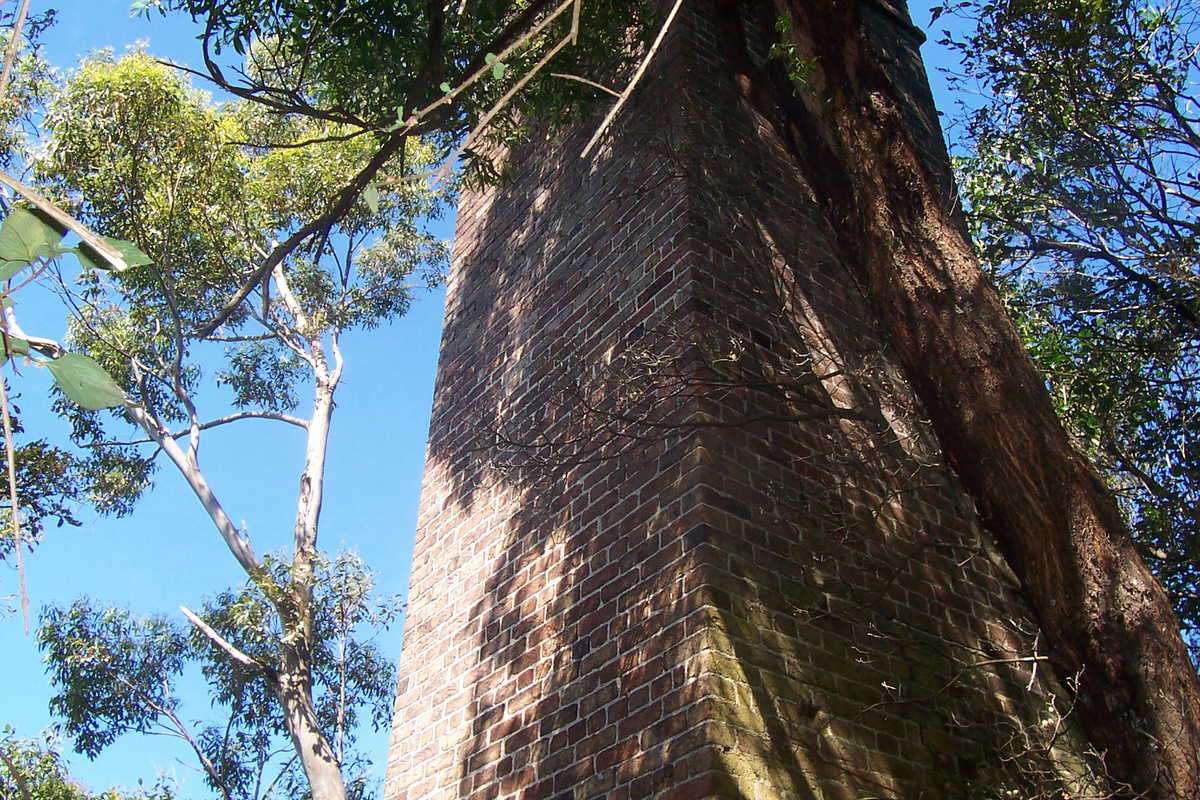
Abandoned coal mine ventilation shaft at Mount Keira, Australia

The Illawarra Coal Measures is a group of sedimentary rocks occurring in the Sydney Basin in eastern Australia. This stratum is up to 150 metres thick. Formed in the Late Permian, it comprises shale, quartz-lithic sandstone, conglomerate rocks, and chert, with sporadically carbonaceous mudstone, coal and seams of torbanite. Coal mining of these measures remains a significant commercial enterprise to the present day. One of the abandoned coal mines in the Blue Mountains is now a tourist attraction.

== See also ==
- Sydney Basin
- Hawkesbury sandstone
- Mittagong Formation
- Ashfield Shale
- Narrabeen group
