= Banks Wall Sandstone =

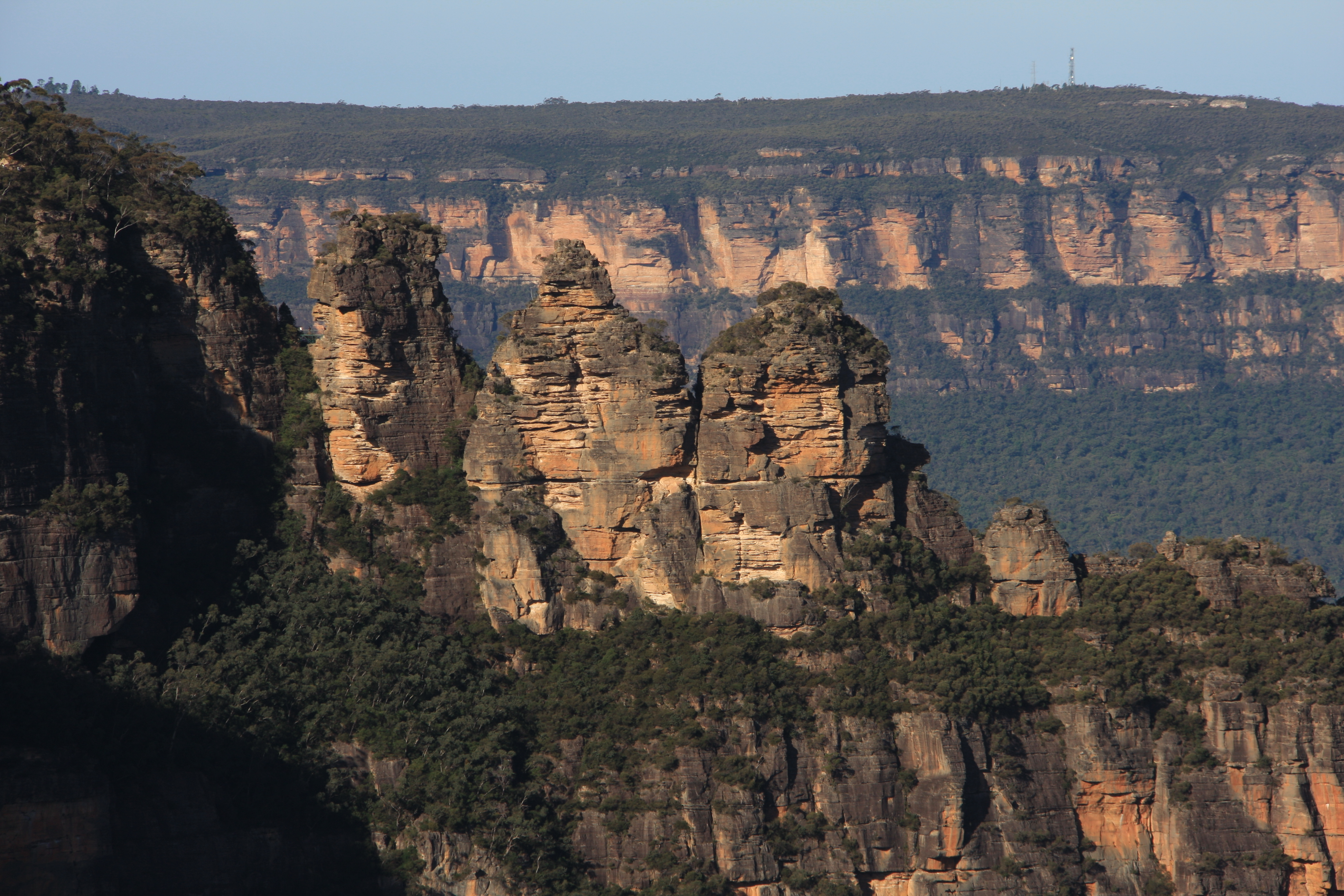
Katoomba, Australia

Banks Wall Sandstone is a type of sedimentary rock occurring in the Sydney Basin in eastern Australia. This stratum is up to 115 metres thick. Often seen in the Blue Mountains, such as at the Three Sisters at Katoomba.

The rock is mostly quartzose, but also contains many ironstone bands, with conglomerates and numerous claystone lenses several metres thick. It is situated above the Mount York Claystone. Formed in the early Triassic, it is part of the Narrabeen Group of sedimentary rocks

== See also ==
- Sydney Basin
- Mount York Claystone
- Narrabeen group
