= Newport Formation =

- Stratigraphic range: Mid-Triassic
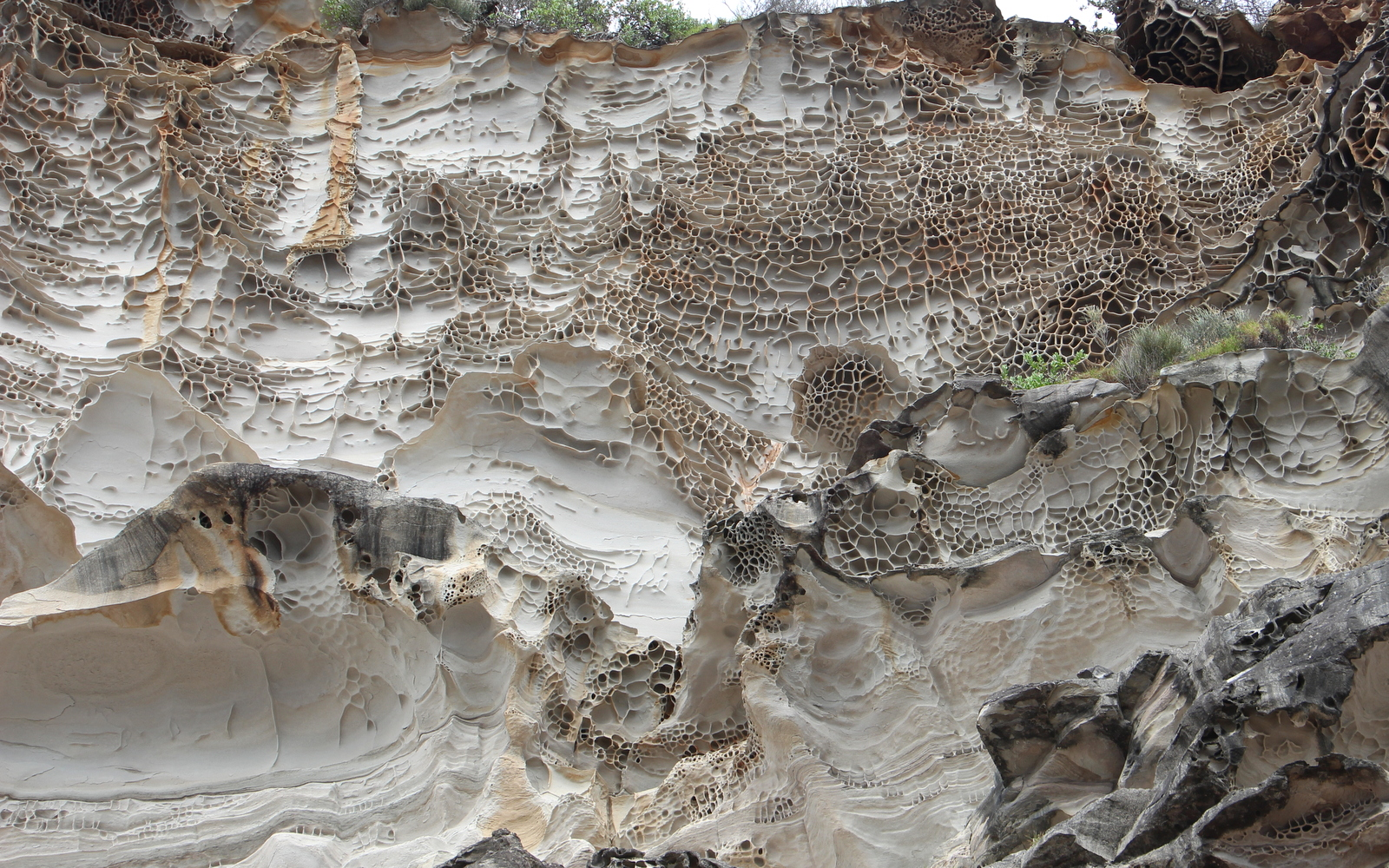
- Wind-weathered sandstone near St Michaels Cave, Avalon Beach, Australia
- Type: Geological formation
- Unit of: Narrabeen Group
- Thickness: up to 49 metres (160 ft)

Location
- Location: Sydney Basin
- Country: Australia

The Newport Formation is a geologic formation outcropping in the Sydney Basin in eastern Australia. This stratum is up to 49 metres thick. Formed in the mid-Triassic, it is part of the Narrabeen Group of sedimentary rocks.

== See also ==
- Sydney Basin
- Bald Hill Claystone
- Garie Formation
- Narrabeen group
