= Longreef =

Australian rock band

- Origin: Sydney, Australia
- Genres: Rock
- Years active: 2010–present
- Members: Josh Barker; Nick Miller; Tristan Davies; Jim Wark
- Website: longreefmusic.com

Longreef is an Australian rock band from Sydney, formed in 2010. The band consists of Josh Barker (vocals/guitar), Nick Miller (guitar), Tristan Davies (drums), and Jim Wark (bass/vocals). The band released their self-titled debut EP in 2011 and their second EP entitled "Dirty Motel" in 2012, which features their Active Rock radio singles "Dirty Motel" and "She Likes The Ladies" featured on Octane (Sirius XM). The band performs over 200 shows a year in the United States and was named one of DeliRadio's Hardest Touring Artists of 2013. The band supports the Ronald McDonald House Charities by donating 10 cents for every mile travelled.

== Band members ==
Current members

- Josh Barker – Lead vocals, guitar
- Nick Miller – Lead guitar
- Jim Wark - Bass, backing vocals
- Tristan Davies – Drums

== Tours ==
- Toured with Minneapolis-based rock band 3 Pill Morning in Fall 2013.
- Has shared stage with rock bands Hoobastank, Sick Puppies, Bush, Thirty Seconds to Mars, Stone Temple Pilots, Seether, and Taproot.

== Discography ==
=== Studio albums ===
Year	Album	Chart positions		
Year	Album	Billboard 200	Top Heatseekers	Independent Albums
2012	Dirty Motel (EP): Released 12 June 2012; Label: Independent	-	-	-
2011	Longreef (EP): Released 6 June 2011; Label: Independent	-	-	-

=== Singles ===
- "Lonely" (2011)
  - Reached #33 on Billboard's Top 40 R&R Indicator Chart
- "Dirty Motel" (2012)
- "She Likes The Ladies" (2013)
- "Battle Plan" (2014)
