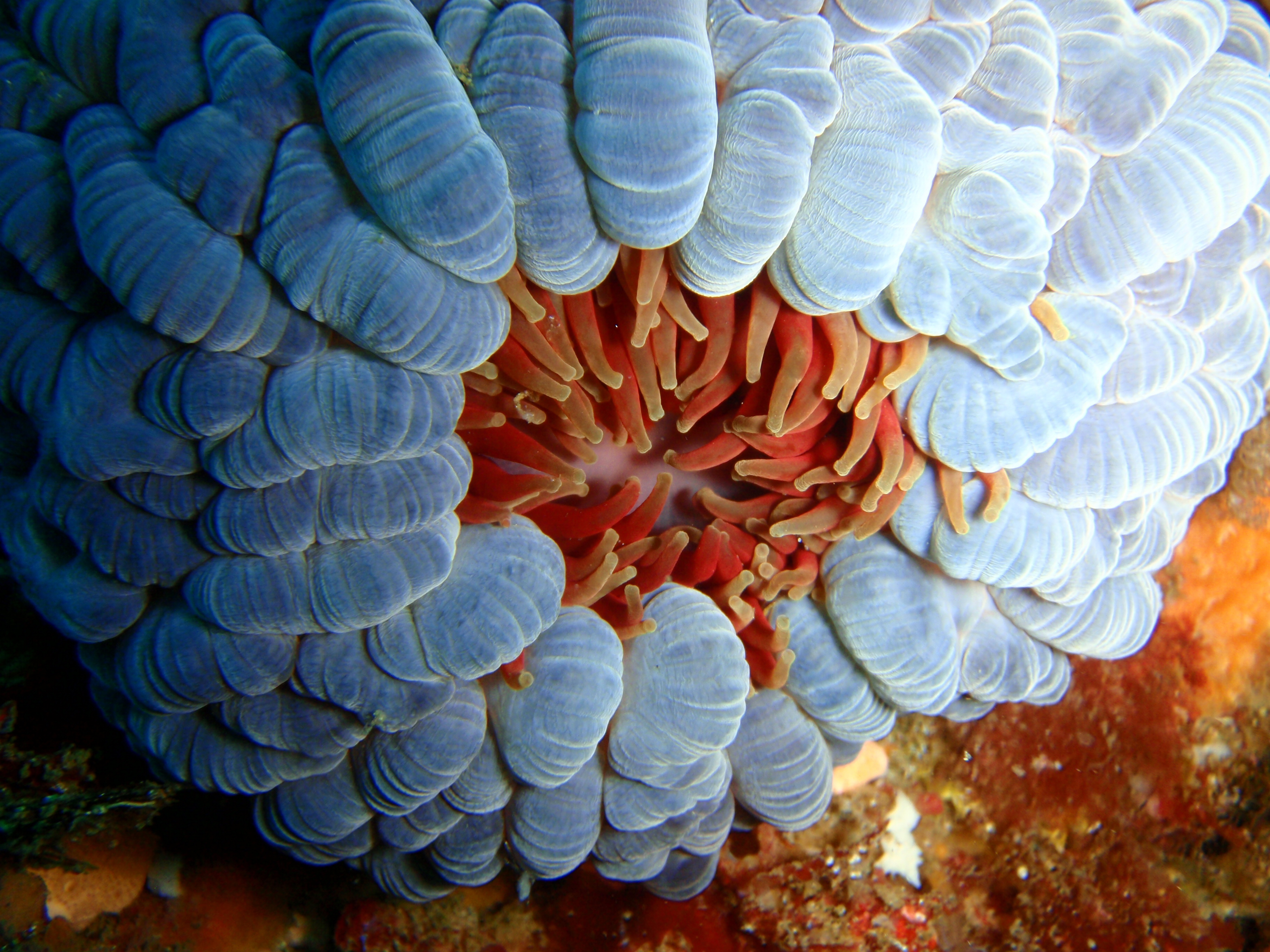

Scientific classification
- Kingdom: Animalia
- Phylum: Cnidaria
- Subphylum: Anthozoa
- Class: Hexacorallia
- Order: Actiniaria
- Family: Actiniidae
- Genus: Phlyctenanthus
- Species: P. australis

Binomial name
- Phlyctenanthus australis Carlgren, 1949

Synonyms
- Phyctenanthus australis

= Phlyctenanthus australis =

Species of sea anemone

Phlyctenanthus australis, commonly known as red anemone or southern anemone, is a species of sea anemone in the family Actiniidae. It grows to a maximum size of 10 cm in diameter. The column is red-brown in colour with blue vesicles covering it. The tentacles are reddish-brown and short, and number up to around 100. This species is found in south Australia, New South Wales, down to Tasmania. This species lives on exposed reefs at depths of between 1 and 35 metres.

== Description ==
Phlyctenanthus australis is a large sea anemone, and is similar in appearance to the swimming anemone (Phlyctenactis tuberculosa), although this species remains permanently attached to the rock. It has a large pedal disc and a wide brick red column which is covered in large vesicles set close together. The fosse is well developed, and the sphincter is strong and circumscribed. There are up to 96 short tentacles, and the muscles of the tentacles and those of the oral disc are ectodermal. There are two siphonoglyphs (grooves leading down to the gullet). The body cavity is subdivided by forty-eight pairs of mesentery. The cnidom (the types of cnidocyte present) consists of spirocysts, basitrichs and microbasic p-mastigophors. This sea anemone is yellowish-brown, with bluish-grey vesicles and pinkish-brown tentacles.

== Distribution and habitat ==
Phlyctenanthus australis is native to the seas around Australia. Its range includes Western Australia, Victoria, Tasmania, New South Wales and the Great Barrier Reef. It is found in the intertidal zone down to depths of about 35 metres (115 ft).

== Ecology ==
Although normally attaches to rocks in shallow water, Phlyctenanthus australis has been found attached to the carapace of the crab Libinia spinosa.
