= Sydney Basin =

Sedimentary basin and region in New South Wales, Australia

- Region
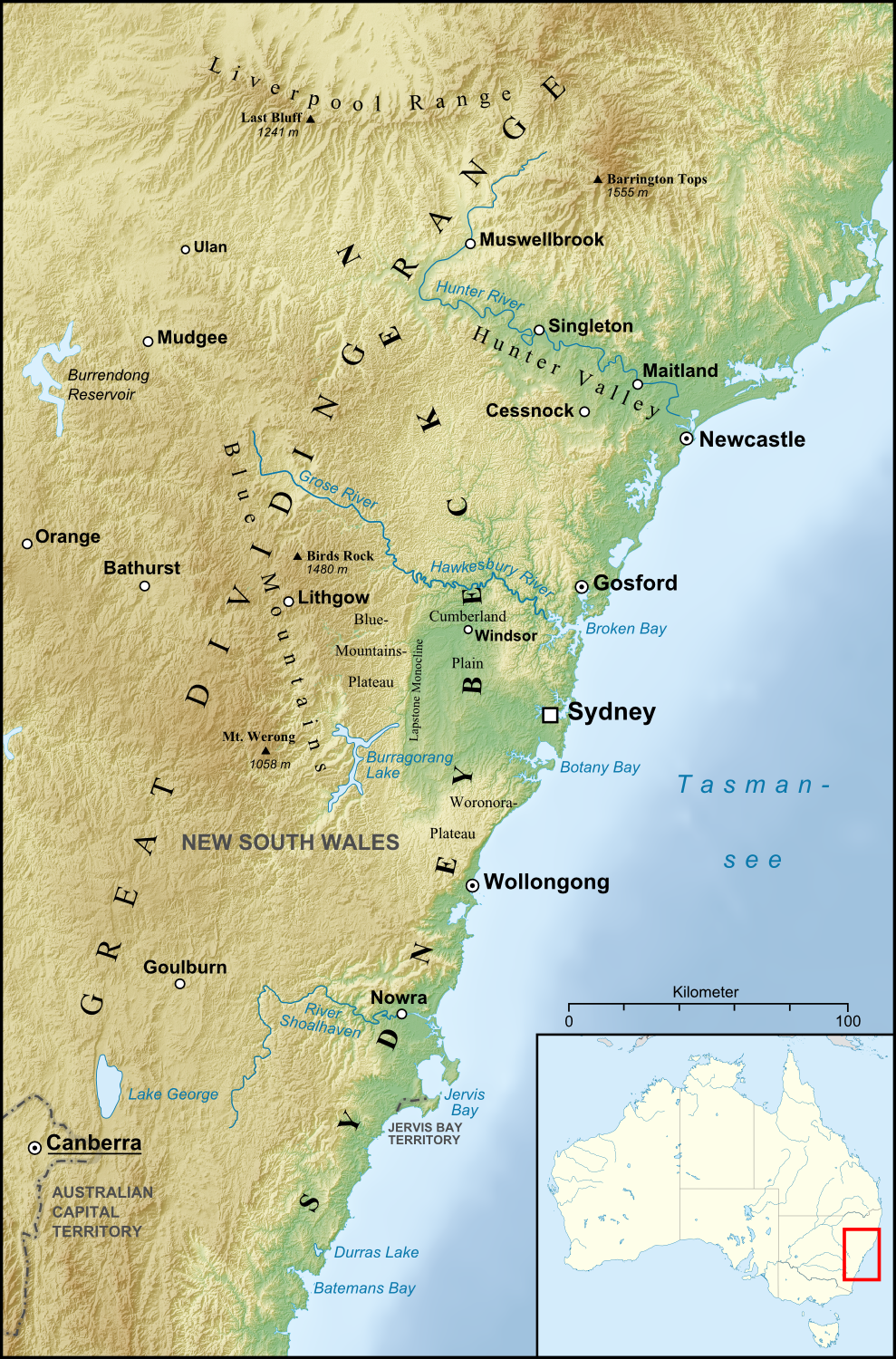
- Map of the Sydney Basin

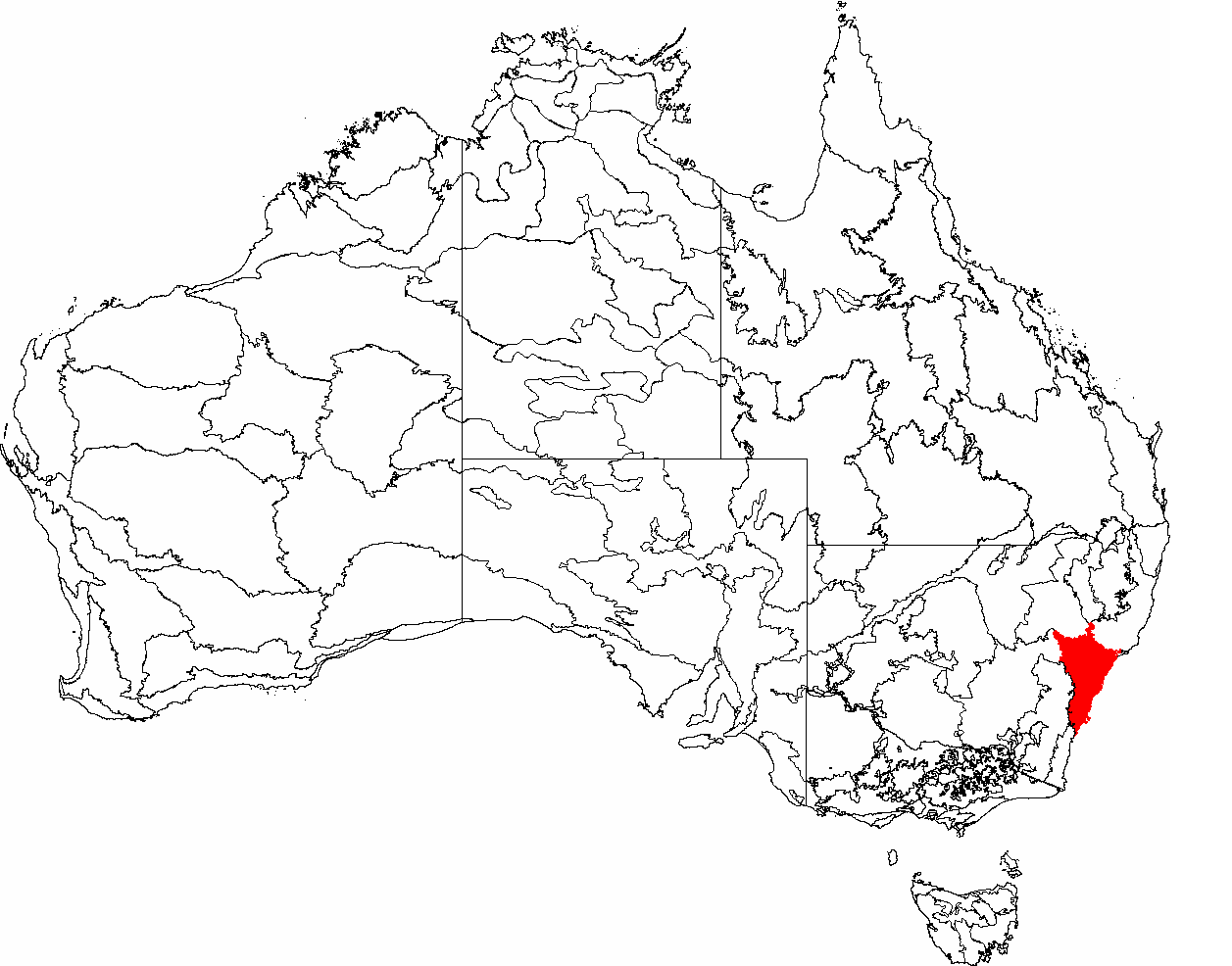
- The interim Australian bioregions, with the Sydney Basin in red
- Coordinates: 33°56′53″S 150°45′36″E
- Country: Australia
- State: New South Wales

Area
  - Total: 36,295.97 km^{2} (14,013.95 sq mi)

Population
  - Total: 6,300,000
  - Density: 173.6/km^{2} (450/sq mi)
- Annual rainfall: 650–1,300 mm (26–51 in)
Regions around Sydney Basin
South Eastern Highlands	North Coast	Tasman Sea
South Eastern Highlands	Sydney Basin	Tasman Sea
Australian Alps	South Coast	Tasman Sea

The Sydney Basin is a major sedimentary basin and interim Australian bioregion on the east coast of New South Wales, Australia, centred on the city of Sydney and extending offshore beneath the Tasman Sea. Geologically, it forms the southernmost part of the Bowen–Gunnedah–Sydney Basin system. The basin initially developed in an extensional setting during the Early Permian before evolving into a retroarc foreland basin during the Late Permian as a result of contraction and uplift associated with the New England Orogen and Hunter–Bowen orogeny.

The Sydney Basin developed from the Early Permian to the Middle Triassic and contains a sedimentary succession several kilometres thick. It forms the southernmost part of the larger Bowen–Gunnedah–Sydney Basin system, a north-northwest-trending, asymmetric basin system extending for more than 1,500 kilometres (930 mi) along eastern Australia. The basin extends from the Newcastle region in the north to near Batemans Bay in the south and westwards towards the Great Dividing Range, lying between the Lachlan Orogen to the southwest and the New England Orogen to the northeast. Its Permian and Triassic strata overlie Palaeozoic basement consisting of Ordovician to Devonian metamorphic rocks and Devonian to Carboniferous intrusive rocks. It contains economically significant coal deposits and includes the major population centres of Sydney, Newcastle, Gosford and Wollongong.

== History and formation ==
=== Early Permian extension ===
The basin initially developed in an extensional tectonic setting during the Early Permian. Rifting affected the eroded Lachlan and New England orogens, accompanied by subsidence associated with cooling of the magmatic arc along the eastern margin of Gondwana. Early sedimentation occurred in half-grabens and other extensional depressions, producing a succession of volcanic, volcaniclastic, marine and continental deposits.

Continued subsidence allowed marine waters to enter parts of the basin. Early Permian sedimentation therefore records alternating marine and terrestrial environments, including glacially influenced deposits, shallow-marine sediments and coal-bearing continental successions. The early basin has variously been interpreted as a continental rift or back-arc basin associated with the active convergent margin to the east.

=== Development as a foreland basin ===
During the later Permian, the tectonic regime changed from predominantly extensional to compressional. Contraction associated with the Hunter–Bowen orogeny produced uplift, crustal thickening and west-directed thrusting in the southern New England Orogen. As the growing orogenic belt imposed a tectonic load on the adjacent crust, the Sydney Basin evolved into a retroarc foreland basin on the inland side of the convergent margin. In this configuration, the New England Orogen lay along the northeastern side of the basin and became an important source of sediment, while the older Lachlan Orogen bounded the basin to the southwest. The Sydney Basin consequently formed the southern part of the much larger Bowen–Gunnedah–Sydney retroarc foreland basin system. Its asymmetric geometry, with the thickest Permian succession developed towards the northeast, reflects this tectonic history.

The transition to foreland-basin conditions was progressive rather than a single event. The Hunter–Bowen orogeny involved several phases of contraction, including major deformation at approximately 270–260 million years ago and around 253 million years ago, followed by a later phase at approximately 235–230 million years ago. Uplift and erosion of the southern New England Orogen supplied increasing quantities of volcanic, sedimentary and low-grade metamorphic detritus to the basin. Provenance, palaeocurrent and sequence-stratigraphic studies of the Newcastle Coal Measures indicate that these Late Permian sediments accumulated within the retroarc foreland basin and were derived principally from the southern New England Orogen. Late Permian subsidence produced major depocentres, particularly in the northeastern Sydney Basin. These accumulated thick marine, deltaic, fluvial, volcanic and coal-bearing successions, including the Newcastle Coal Measures. The development of the foreland basin therefore coincided with major coal-forming episodes that produced the economically important coalfields of the Hunter Region and Illawarra.

=== Triassic sedimentation ===
Sedimentation continued into the Triassic as the basin became increasingly dominated by continental environments. Large river systems transported sediment across the basin, depositing the Narrabeen Group, Hawkesbury Sandstone and ultimately the Wianamatta Group. The Hawkesbury Sandstone represents a major Middle Triassic fluvial system and now forms many of the conspicuous sandstone plateaus, cliffs and gorges of the Sydney region and Blue Mountains.

Fine-grained sedimentation became increasingly important during deposition of the Wianamatta Group. The Ashfield Shale, Minchinbury Sandstone and Bringelly Shale record changing environments ranging from lacustrine and marginal-marine conditions to shoreline and predominantly alluvial environments. The final major phase of the Hunter–Bowen orogeny occurred during the Middle to Late Triassic, producing further contraction and deformation of the basin. By the end of the Triassic, widespread sedimentation had largely ceased and erosion became dominant.

=== Post-Triassic history ===
No significant Jurassic sedimentary succession is preserved in the Sydney Basin, indicating a prolonged period of erosion following Triassic deposition. Igneous activity nevertheless occurred during the Jurassic, producing numerous volcanic diatremes and intrusions, including the Prospect dolerite intrusion at Prospect Hill. Rifting and opening of the Tasman Sea during the Late Cretaceous profoundly modified the eastern margin of the basin. Extension associated with the breakup of eastern Gondwana established much of the present offshore structural margin and was followed by prolonged uplift, denudation and landscape development. Later uplift and erosion exposed different levels of the Permian and Triassic succession. Resistant sandstone units, particularly the Hawkesbury Sandstone, form elevated plateaus, cliffs and deeply incised gorges, whereas softer shale units generally underlie lower and more gently undulating terrain such as the Cumberland Plain.

Along the eastern margin of the lower Blue Mountains, the sedimentary succession is deformed by the Lapstone Monocline, part of the approximately 95 km (59 mi)-long Lapstone Structural Complex. The complex consists of a north–south-trending system of monoclines and faults separating the elevated lower Blue Mountains from the Cumberland Plain and is interpreted as a comparatively young episode of compressional deformation superimposed on the much older Sydney Basin succession.

== Structure ==
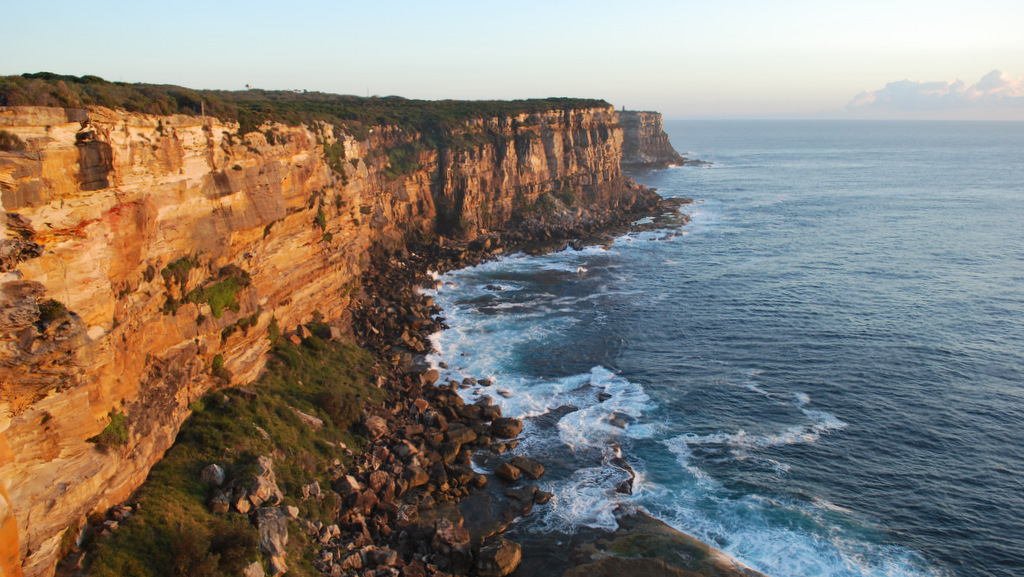
Much of the Sydney Basin consists of elevated sandstone plateaus, contrasting with lower areas such as the Cumberland Plain and Hunter Valley.

The Sydney Basin is structurally asymmetric and contains a series of regional synclines, anticlines, structural shelves, troughs, monoclines and faults. Many of the dominant structures trend approximately north–south and either formed during Permian–Triassic tectonism or reflect reactivation of older structures within the underlying Palaeozoic basement. The basin can consequently be regarded structurally as a series of troughs and ridges rather than a single simple depression.

Major structures include the Lapstone Structural Complex, Mount Tomah Monocline, Kurrajong Fault, Lochinvar Anticline, Kulnura Anticline and Lake Macquarie Syncline. In the southern Sydney Basin, additional synclines, anticlines and faults commonly have northwesterly trends. The Blue Mountains and Illawarra structural shelves are separated from adjoining parts of the basin by faults and monoclines that may reflect older basement structures.

The western margin of the lower Blue Mountains is characterised by several structural troughs and shelves. The Mount Tomah Monocline separates the Wollar and Blue Mountains shelves from the Murrurundi and Macdonald troughs, while the Lapstone Structural Complex forms a major structural boundary between the lower Blue Mountains and the Cumberland Plain. The latter is a 95 km (59 mi)-long segmented association of faults and monoclines interpreted as the near-surface expression of a deep-seated west-dipping thrust system.

=== Cumberland and Fairfield basins ===
Within the broader Sydney Basin, the Cumberland Plain occupies a relatively low-lying structural and erosional depression in western Sydney. The geological centre of the Sydney Basin lies near Fairfield, approximately 30 km (19 mi) west of the Sydney central business district.

A smaller synclinal structure within western Sydney is commonly referred to as the Fairfield Basin. It preserves some of the youngest surviving Triassic strata of the Sydney Basin, particularly the Wianamatta Group. Post-Triassic erosion removed much of these upper strata elsewhere, while the structural depression around Fairfield protected thicker remnants from erosion. The Bringelly Shale, the uppermost major formation of the Wianamatta Group, is consequently particularly well preserved within the Fairfield Basin and reaches approximately 60 m (200 ft) in thickness around Potts Hill. The preservation of comparatively soft Wianamatta Group rocks within this structural depression has also influenced the modern landscape. Their weathering produces the comparatively low, gently undulating terrain and clay-rich soils characteristic of much of the Cumberland Plain, contrasting with the rugged plateaus and deeply incised valleys developed on the more resistant Hawkesbury Sandstone to the north, east and west.

== Igneous activity ==
Although the Sydney Basin is predominantly sedimentary, several episodes of igneous activity affected the basin from the Permian into the Cenozoic. Volcanism was particularly important during parts of the Permian, when volcanic and volcaniclastic material derived from the active eastern Australian margin was incorporated into the basin succession. The southern basin includes the Gerringong Volcanics, while the Rylstone Volcanics and other volcanic units occur elsewhere within the basin system. A Late Permian intrusive complex near Nowra, the Coonemia Complex, consists of dykes, sills and a large sheet intrusion. Basaltic intrusions began to penetrate the basin succession around the Permian–Triassic boundary and occurred sporadically during later geological periods. Post-Triassic igneous activity is represented by numerous dykes, sills, plugs and volcanic diatremes. Because little or no Jurassic sedimentary succession is preserved in the basin, these intrusions provide some of the principal evidence for geological activity in the region during the Jurassic.

One of the largest and best-known intrusions is the Early Jurassic Prospect dolerite intrusion at Prospect Hill in western Sydney. The intrusion penetrated Triassic sedimentary rocks and consists principally of doleritic and picritic rocks. Other prominent igneous centres occur at Hornsby, Mount Tomah and Mount Wilson. Numerous volcanic breccia pipes occur throughout the Sydney region, particularly around the metropolitan area. The basin is also crossed by numerous igneous dykes. Some form conspicuous linear geological structures and may locally influence drainage, groundwater movement and engineering conditions where their weathering characteristics differ from the surrounding sandstone and shale.

== Hydrogeology ==
Groundwater within the Sydney Basin occurs in several distinct aquifer systems controlled by lithology, fractures and weathering. The Hawkesbury Sandstone forms the principal regional bedrock aquifer, while sandstone units of the Narrabeen Group and water-bearing Permian strata form additional aquifers. The predominantly fine-grained Wianamatta Group generally forms minor aquifers and aquitards. Groundwater flow through the Hawkesbury Sandstone is strongly influenced by fractures because the intact sandstone generally has relatively low matrix permeability. Faults, joints and bedding-plane discontinuities can therefore substantially increase local hydraulic conductivity.

In western Sydney, shallow groundwater also occurs within residual soils, colluvium and deeply weathered Wianamatta Group rocks. This shallow system is generally about 3 to 10 m (9.8 to 32.8 ft) deep and has highly variable permeability, with groundwater movement locally enhanced by fractures and ferricrete horizons. Groundwater and soil salinity associated with shale terrain can have significant implications for urban development and infrastructure across the Cumberland Plain.

== Engineering geology ==
The sedimentary rocks of the Sydney Basin have had a major influence on the construction and development of the Sydney metropolitan region. Much of central and northern Sydney is underlain by Hawkesbury Sandstone, Ashfield Shale or the transitional Mittagong Formation, while the younger Bringelly Shale is widespread across parts of western and south-western Sydney. Their contrasting mechanical and hydrogeological properties are important in the design of tunnels, foundations, cuttings and deep excavations. The Hawkesbury Sandstone generally forms strong rock masses and has hosted numerous major underground projects, including road, railway, utility and water tunnels. Its engineering behaviour is strongly influenced by bedding, joints, faults and other discontinuities, however, and rock-mass properties may differ substantially from those of intact sandstone. High horizontal in situ stress within the Sydney rock mass is also an important consideration in deep tunnels and excavations.

Shale units present different engineering conditions. Ashfield Shale is generally weaker than Hawkesbury Sandstone, while Bringelly Shale is weakly cemented and may contain reactive clay minerals. Weathered Bringelly Shale can exhibit shrink–swell behaviour and may degrade rapidly following excavation and repeated wetting and drying, creating potential problems for foundations, cut slopes and deep excavations in western Sydney. The distinction is increasingly important as major infrastructure and urban development extend across Western Sydney. At the St Marys station excavation for the Sydney Metro – Western Sydney Airport project, for example, approximately 20 m (66 ft) of excavation through Bringelly Shale required specific consideration of swelling behaviour and ground-anchor performance.

== See also ==
- Homebush Bay Fault Zone
- Great Sydney Dyke
- Fairfield Basin
- Illawarra Coal Measures
- Mittagong Formation
- Narrabeen group
- Sydney sandstone
- Wianamatta Shale
- Tasman Abyssal Plain
