= Cooks River/Castlereagh Ironbark Forest =

Forest in Sydney, Australia

Castlereagh Ironbark Forest/ Cooks River Clay Plain Scrub Forest
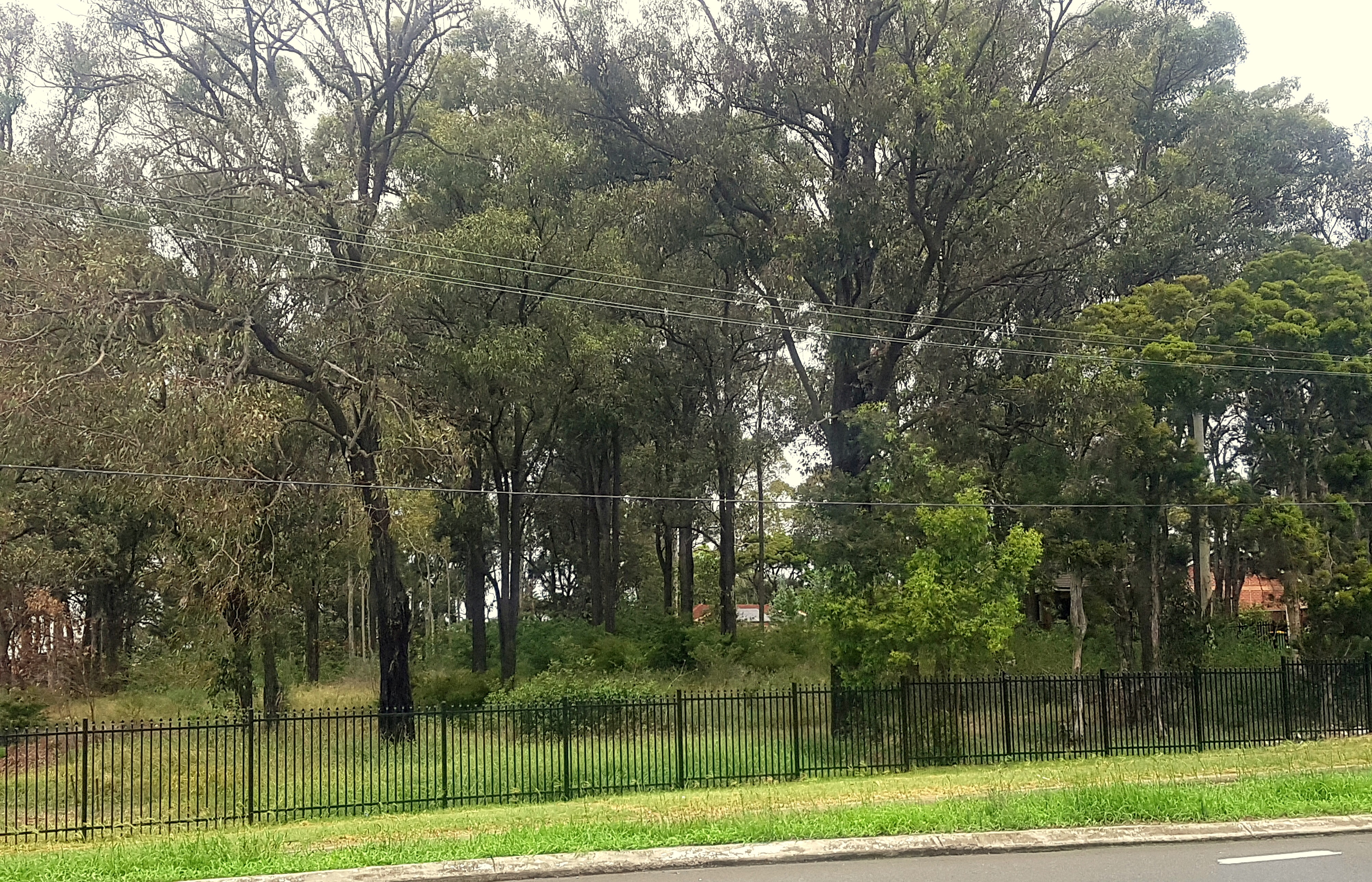
- Reserved remnant near Smithfield General Cemetery in Dublin Street

Ecology
- Realm: Australasia
- Biome: Temperate grasslands, savannas, and shrublands
- Borders: Cumberland Plain Woodland; Shale Sandstone Transition Forest; Sydney Turpentine-Ironbark Forest

Geography
- Area: 11.01 km^{2} (4.25 mi^{2})
- Country: Australia
- Elevation: 60–100 metres (200–330 ft)
- Geology: Sandstone, shale
- Climate type: Humid subtropical climate (Cfa)
- Soil types: Clay, sand

The Cooks River/Castlereagh Ironbark Forest (CRCIF) is a scattered, dry sclerophyll, open-forest to low woodland and scrubland which occurs predominantly in the Cumberland subregion of the Sydney basin bioregion, between Castlereagh and Holsworthy, as well as around the headwaters of the Cooks River. The Cooks River Clay Plain Scrub Forest is a component of this ecological community, though both belong to a larger occurring community called the Temperate Eucalyptus fibrosa/Melaleuca decora woodland.

On 10 May 2002 the NSW Government gazetted the forest as a critically Endangered Ecological Community under the Threatened Species Conservation Act 1995; and on 17 March 2015 the forest was listed as Critically Endangered by the Australian Government under the Environment Protection and Biodiversity Conservation Act 1999. The community occurs in fragmented patches within the Cumberland Plain Woodland, where it generally grades into it.

== Ecology ==
Around 1,101-hectare (2,721-acre) in size, the ecological community consists of scrub-forests and open-forest savannas that are dominated by broad-leaved Ironbark (Eucalyptus fibrosa) and Paperbark (Melaleuca decora). The main threat is further clearing for development, as well as weed invasion, inappropriate fire regime, damage from vehicles, and impacts from surrounding development. Fencing also prevents wildlife movement and increases injuries and deaths. There is also the potential of clay/shale extraction.

The community includes a portion of the eastern Shale Sandstone Transition Forest, where it intergrades to it (often where the alluvium is shallow). In addition, it also grades to Castlereagh Swamp Woodland in damp slumps and Castlereagh Scribbly Gum Woodland on sandier soils.

The canopy includes Eucalyptus resinifera, Syncarpia glomulifera, Eucalyptus eugenioides, Acacia parramattensis, Melaleuca nodosa, Melaleuca decora and Casuarina glauca. The smaller trees include Acacia longifolia, Bursaria spinosa, Solanum aviculare and Polyscias sambucifolia. The ground covers include Entolasia marginata, Cymbopogon refractus, Dichondra repens, and Commelina cyanea. Smaller shrubs include Pultenaea villosa, Acacia falcata and Leptospermum trinervium. Vines include Eustrephus latifolius, Glycine tabacina and Cayratia clematidea.

A 2014 biodiversity report indicated that parts of the CRCIF will be impacted by the development of the Western Sydney Airport.

== Geography ==
The majority of the forest community is found in the north-west section of the Cumberland Subregion in the Castlereagh area between Penrith and Richmond. Other significant patches occur in the Kemps Creek and Holsworthy areas, which transition to scrub, with the rest occurring in the eastern section of the Cumberland Subregion, such as in the cities of Fairfield (surrounding Prospect Creek), Liverpool and the western portion of the Canterbury-Bankstown LGA. It is found on clay soils traced from Wianamatta shale or the deposits of ancient river systems (i.e. alluvium), generally with a high component of ironstone nodules.

The eastern presence of this community, found in the Canterbury-Auburn-Strathfield-Bankstown-Parramatta-Holroyd area, are currently listed within the Cooks River Clay Plain Scrub Forest Endangered Ecological Community. Approximately 7% of the original spacing is estimated to remain. The scrub community was once abundant in the Bankstown-Auburn-Regents Park and Strathfield districts, but has been seriously impacted by the urban development of inner south-western Sydney.

== Beverly Grove Bushland ==
Beverly Grove Bushland, part of the CRCIF, is 1.87 hectares (5 acres) of remnant bushland between Canterbury Golf Course and the M5 East Motorway. It is one of the larger patches of the CRCIF and has been preserved as an offset for the construction of the M5 East. Despite this, 1.4 hectares (3 acres) of the site has been proposed as a construction compound for Stage 2: King Georges Road Interchange and New M5 of WestConnex.

Following approval of a secret biobanking package to offset the destruction of the 1.4 hectares (3 acres) of Beverly Grove Bushland, it was expected that the bushland be bulldozed on 31 August 2016. Bulldozers moved in on Threatened Species Day (7 September 2016) and started demolishing the bushland. However, despite reports of protestors halting work, demolition continued.

== See also ==
- Ecology of Sydney
- Environment Protection and Biodiversity Conservation Act 1999
- Threatened Species Conservation Act 1995
