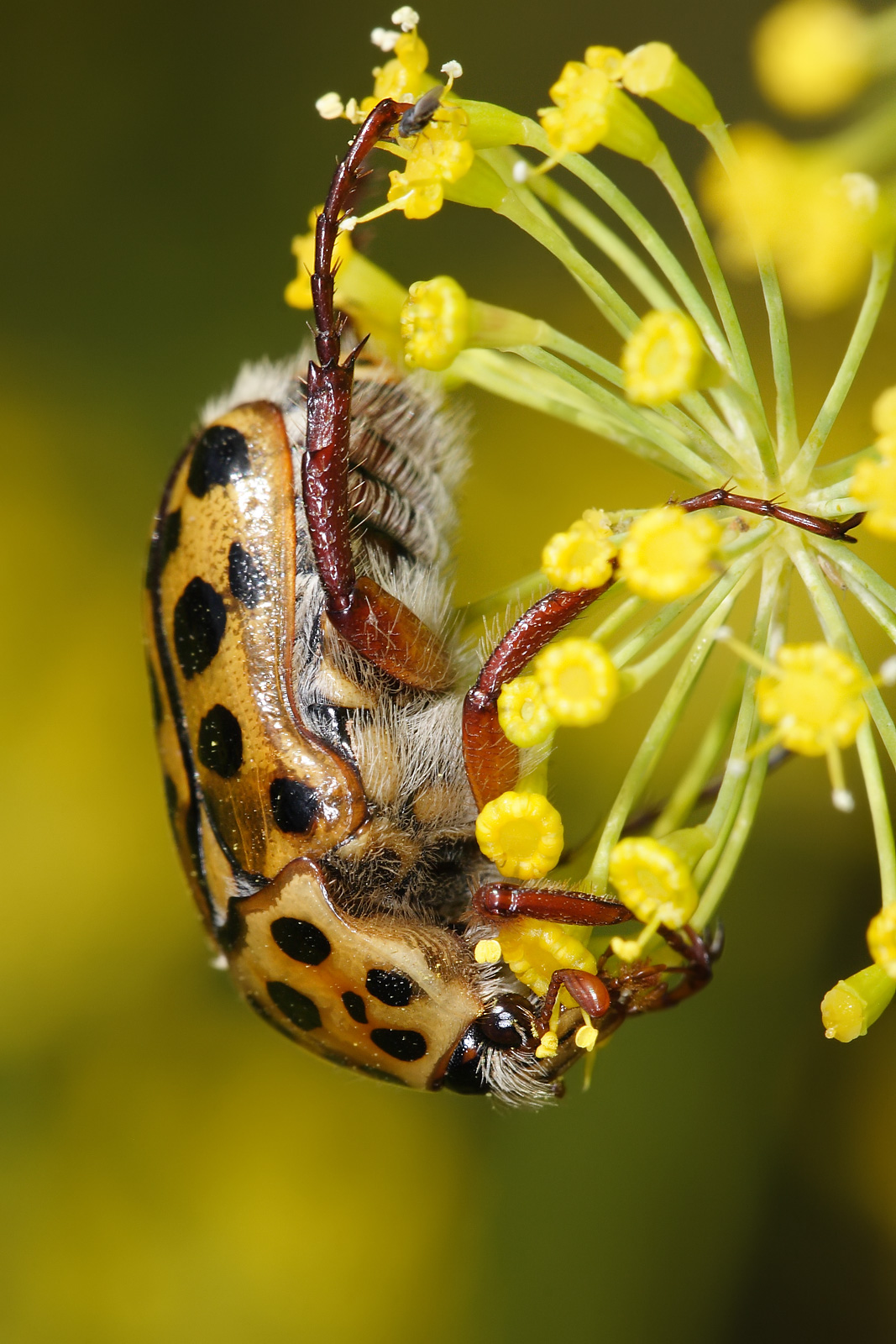
- At Swifts Creek, Victoria

Scientific classification
- Kingdom: Animalia
- Phylum: Arthropoda
- Clade: Pancrustacea
- Class: Insecta
- Order: Coleoptera
- Suborder: Polyphaga
- Infraorder: Scarabaeiformia
- Family: Scarabaeidae
- Genus: Neorrhina
- Species: N. punctata

Binomial name
- Neorrhina punctata (Donovan, 1805)

Synonyms
- Numerous, see text

= Punctate flower chafer =

Species of beetle

The punctate flower chafer or spotted flower chafer, Neorrhina punctata, is a species of flower chafer. The chafers are beetles of subfamily Cetoniinae in the large scarab beetle family (Scarabaeidae). Among the chafers, N. punctata belongs to the tribe Schizorhinini.

This beetle occurs in eastern mainland Australia, from Victoria, through New South Wales to northern Queensland.

It is also known under several other scientific names, but these are obsolete or misspelled:

- Cetonia punctatum (lapsus)
- Cetonia punctata Donovan, 1805
- Neorrhina punctatum (lapsus)
- Polystigma punctatum (lapsus)
- Polystigma punctata (Donovan, 1805)
