= Castlereagh Scribbly Gum and Agnes Banks Woodlands =

Indigenous woodland community in Sydney, Australia

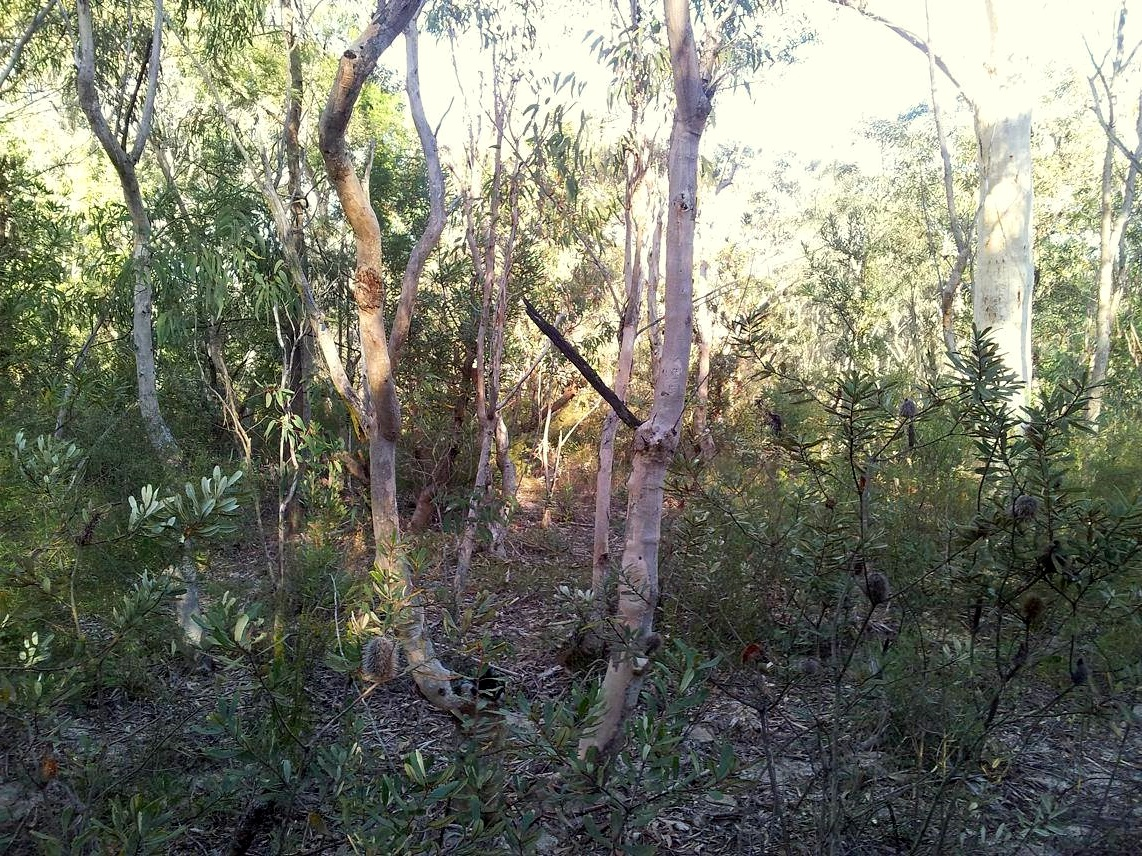

Ecology
- Realm: Australasia
- Biome: Temperate grasslands, savannas, and shrublands
- Borders: Shale Sandstone Transition Forest

Geography
- Area: 0.98 km^{2} (0.38 mi^{2})
- Country: Australia
- Elevation: 60–80 metres (200–260 ft)
- Coordinates: 33.615278°S 150.716111°E
- Geology: Sandstone, shale
- Climate type: Humid subtropical climate (Cfa)
- Soil types: Sand

The Castlereagh Scribbly Gum and Agnes Banks Woodlands is an endangered sclerophyll low-woodland and shrubland community found in western Sydney, New South Wales, Australia. Vegetation comprises low woodlands with sclerophyllous shrubs and an uneven ground layer of graminoids and forbs.

== Geography ==
Originally at 615 hectares, it is a low woodland community measuring at only 98 hectares, where it is mostly found near Agnes Banks on the east side of the Hawkesbury River in the Penrith area. Parts of it are preserved at the Agnes Banks Nature Reserve, near Richmond. It is mostly found on the Cumberland Plain on flat or mildly undulating terrain on valley floors, in the Castlereagh area in the north-west, with minor presence near Holsworthy just outside the Cumberland Plain, Kemps Creek and Longneck Lagoon.

Having low nutrient soils, it sits on wind-blown sand over the Tertiary Alluvium deposits from the Hawkesbury-Nepean River system, in areas that receives 700–900 mm annual rainfall. The community morphs into the smaller, Castlereagh Swamp Woodland, a very proximate community which lies on poorly draining clay soils.

== Ecology ==
Dominant tree species include the namesake Eucalyptus sclerophylla, in addition to Angophora bakeri, Eucalyptus fibrosa, Eucalyptus parramattensis, Eucalyptus racemosa and Banksia serrata, and understorey shrubs such as, Banksia aemula, Melaleuca decora, Hakea sericea, Monotoca scoparia, Leptospermum trinervium, Banksia oblongifolia, Conospermum taxifolium, Ricinocarpos pinifolius, Dillwynia sericea and Persoonia nutans.

Ground layer includes Themeda triandra, Entolasia stricta, Cyathochaeta diandra, Dianella revoluta, Lepidosperma urophorum, Stylidium graminifolium, Lepyrodia scariosa, Mitrasacme polymorpha, Trachymene incisa and Laxmannia gracilis.

=== Fauna ===
Mammals and reptiles include Ctenotus taeniolatus, Tiliqua scincoides, Petaurus breviceps, Myotis macropus and Trichosurus vulpecula, with frogs such as Litoria verreauxii, Crinia signifera and Limnodynastes tasmaniensis.

Birds include Smicrornis brevirostris, Acanthiza reguloides and Acanthiza nana, Petrochelidon nigricans, Artamus cyanopterus, Colluricincla harmonica, Pachycephala rufiventris and Pachycephala pectoralis, Daphoenositta chrysoptera, Melanodryas cucullata, Pardalotus striatus and Pardalotus punctatus, Lichenostomus fuscus, Tyto javanica, Entomyzon cyanotis and the rare Petroica goodenovii.
