= Cumberland Plain =

Plain in New South Wales, Australia

Cumberland Plain Sydney Plain
- Plain
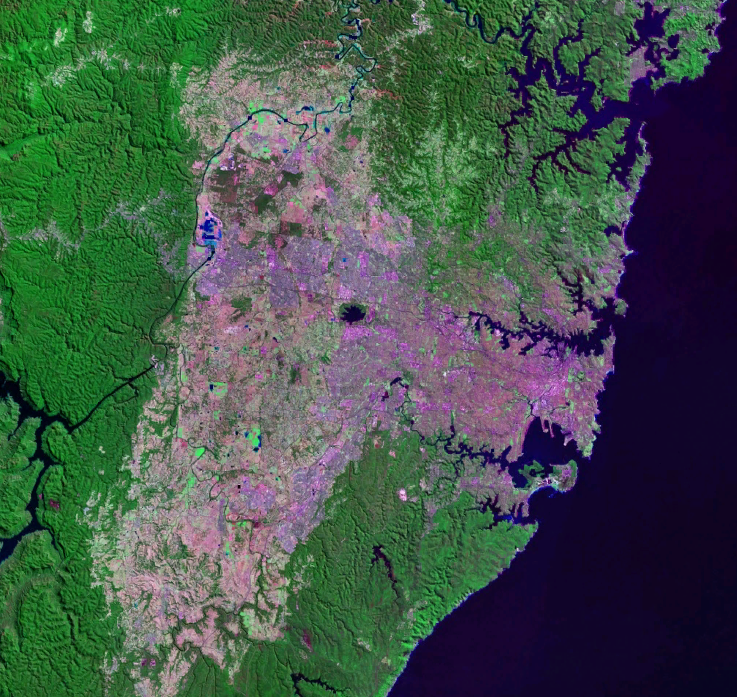
- The Cumberland Plain covers the sweeping Greater Western Sydney area, from the Inner West to Penrith.
- Interactive map of Cumberland Plain
- Coordinates: 33°45′S 151°00′E
- Location: Greater Western Sydney, Northern Sydney, Inner West, St George

Area
  - Total: 2,750 km^{2} (1,060 sq mi)
- Rivers: Hawkesbury River, Nepean River, Parramatta River, Georges River, Woronora River

The Cumberland Plain, also known as Cumberland Basin, is a relatively flat region lying to the west of Sydney CBD in New South Wales, Australia. An IBRA biogeographic region, Cumberland Basin is the preferred physiographic and geological term for the low-lying plain of the Permian-Triassic Sydney Basin found between Sydney and the Blue Mountains, and it is a structural sub-basin of the Sydney Basin.

The Cumberland Plain has an area of roughly 2,750 square kilometres (1,060 sq mi), which lies on Triassic shales and sandstones. Shaping the geography of Sydney, it extends from 10 kilometres (6.2 mi) north of Windsor in the north, to Picton in the south; and from the Nepean-Hawkesbury River in the west almost to Sydney City, and includes parts of the Inner West and Northern Suburbs in the east. Much of the Sydney metropolitan area is located on the Plain. The Hornsby Plateau is located to the north and is dissected by steep valleys.

The plain takes its name from Cumberland County, in which it is situated, one of the cadastral land divisions of New South Wales. The name Cumberland was conferred on the County by Governor Arthur Phillip in honour of Ernest Augustus, Duke of Cumberland. Being the most populous region in Australia, the Cumberland Plain is one of the fastest-growing areas of the country in terms of population and it is home to a variety of Australian animal species, which are observable in the urban environments.

== Geography ==
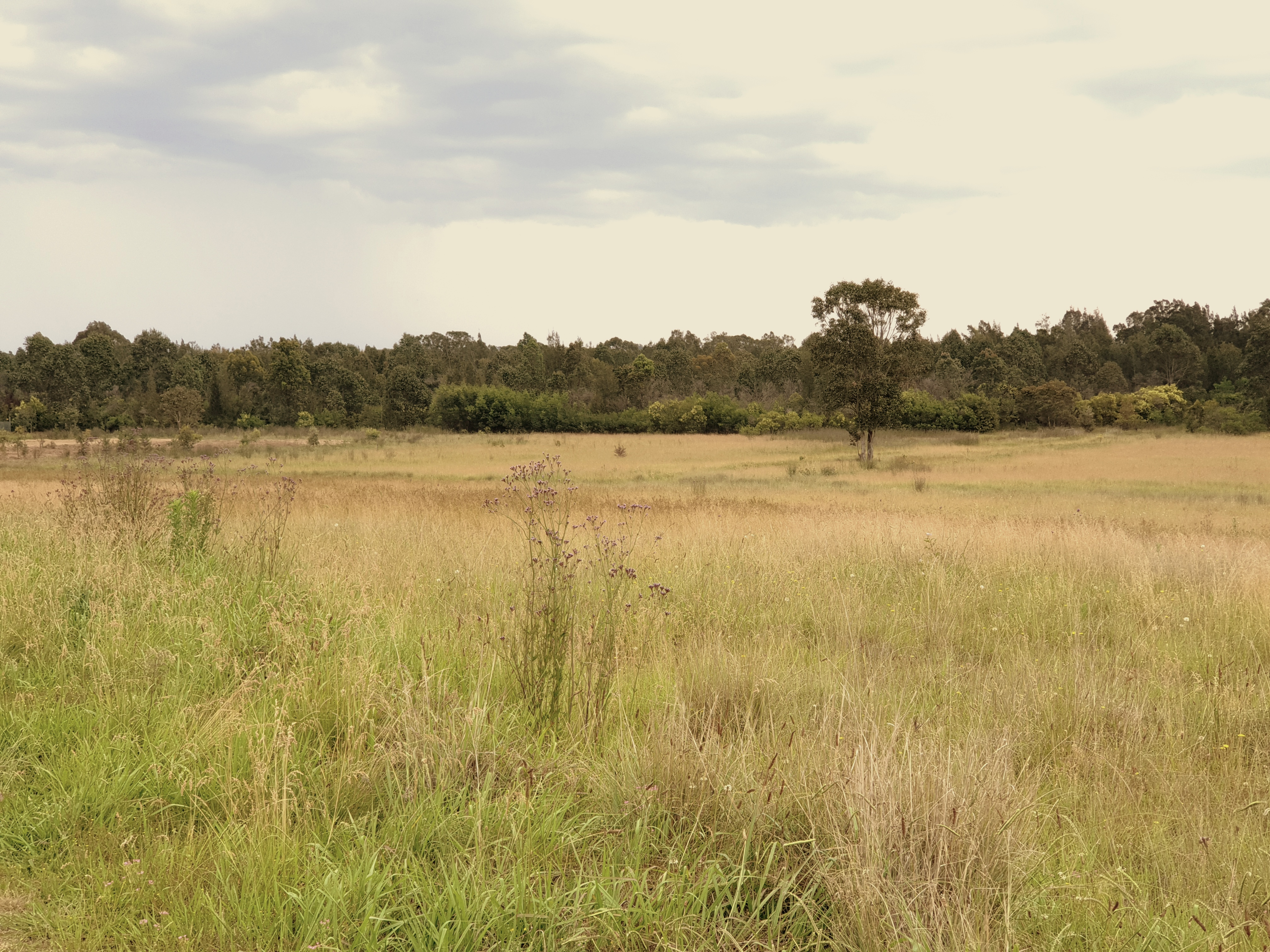
Typical savannah-like, grassy woodlands in the plain

The Cumberland Plain stretches from Ryde in the east to the Nepean River in the west and from Cattai in the north to Thirlmere in the far south. The Cumberland Plain sprawls over south-western Sydney, and into the Greater Western Sydney area. It is within the local government areas of Blacktown, Burwood, Camden, the western portion of Campbelltown, Canada Bay, Canterbury-Bankstown, Cumberland, Fairfield, Georges River, Hawkesbury, the Western outskirts of the Inner West Council, Liverpool, Parramatta, Penrith, Ryde, Strathfield, The Hills Shire, Wingecarribee, and Wollondilly.

The Cumberland Plain is separated by the more hilly areas that fall into other Sydney regions such as Sydney CBD (in the City of Sydney), North Shore, Northern Beaches, Eastern Suburbs, Southern Sydney (including Sutherland Shire), Hills District, Hornsby Shire and the Forest District, which areas that border the Cumberland Plain.

The region mostly consists of low rolling hills and wide valleys in a rain shadow area near the Blue Mountains. The annual rainfall of the plain is typically around 700–900 mm, and is generally lower than the elevated terrain that partially surrounds it. Common vegetation in the Cumberland Plain is eucalyptus trees. The sclerophyll woodlands are situated on a nutrient-poor alluvium deposited by the Nepean River from sandstone and shale bedrock in the Blue Mountains. Despite this, they support a tremendous regional biodiversity. Cleared and used first for agriculture and then for urban development, most of the ecological communities that originally flourished on the plain are now considered endangered.

== Geology ==
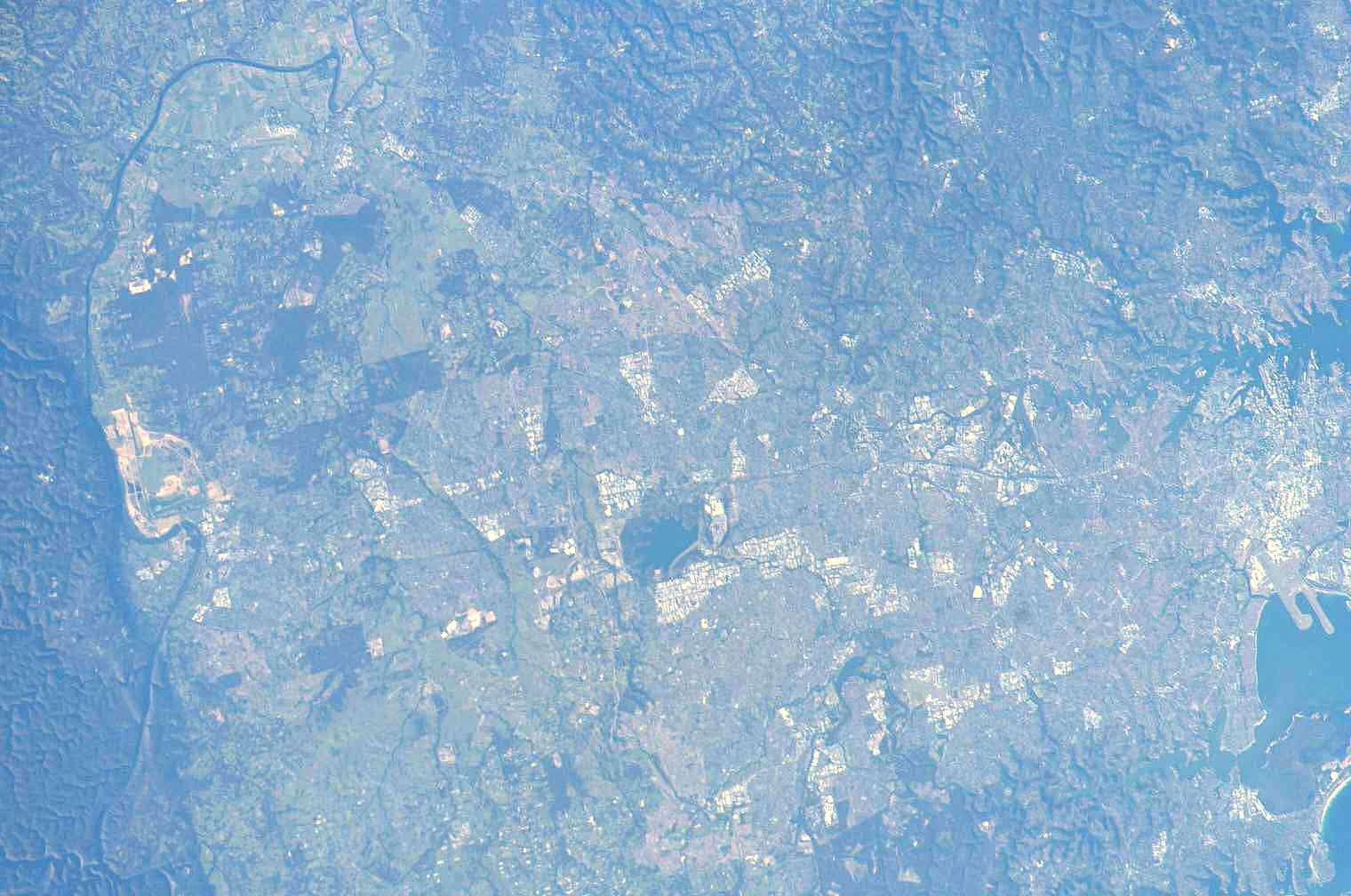
An aerial view of the urbanized plain in western Sydney, which is encircled by a series of plateaus and a submergent coastline to the east.

The Sydney region lies on a submergent coastline where the ocean level has risen to flood deep rias. The Cumberland basin is a structural and topographical depression within the sedimentary Sydney Basin in Australia's southeast. Formed about 80 million years ago, the Cumberland Plain consists of not exactly flat plains; overall it is a low-lying area, largely over shale and labile sandstone, which derives its recognition largely by comparison with the surrounding uplands of harder quartzose Sydney sandstone. Relative to the surrounding higher sandstone lands, Hornsby Plateau and Blue Mountains Plateaux (which was uplifted 90 million years ago), it was an early matter of debate in Sydney physiographic circles as to whether the Cumberland Plain had gone down, or the surrounding plateaux had been raised up. The Cumberland Basin's perimeters had therefore developed in various ways and at different time period, where volcanic and tectonic movements had accompanied the uplift of Australia's Eastern Highlands within the time zone of 80–10 million years ago.

To the south, the Cumberland Basin's topography is closely linked to the development of the Camden Syncline, which was active in the late Permian to the Middle Triassic period. The Botany Basin, which would have started to settle since the Oligocene, sits within this Lachlan Transverse Zone, which hints that this area of the Basin would have already existed at this stage. During the Cenozoic period, the Penrith and Botany basins may have acted as the Cumberland Basin's drainage, thereby explicating the incomprehensible activity of rivers within the area. Despite much study, especially along the western side at the Lapstone Monocline, this complex matter is still not fully understood. There are volcanic rocks from low hills in the shale landscapes. Swamps and lagoons are existent on the floodplain of the Nepean River.

Ashfield Shale consists mainly of laminite and dark grey siltstone, while Bringelly Shale comprises shale with occasional calcareous claystone, laminite and infrequent coal seams. Minchinbury Sandstone consists predominantly of fine- to medium-grained quartz-lithic sandstone. The Wianamatta Plain, with many undulating hills of Wianamatta Group shales and sandstones, bounded by the Woronora and Illawarra Plateaus to the south, the Blue Mountains Plateau to the west and the Hornsby Plateau to the north/northeast. At the front of the Blue Mountains Plateau runs the Lapstone Structural Complex, which forms the western edge of the Cumberland Basin and Cumberland Plain. This is a north-south trending collection of reverse faults and monoclinal folds which extends generally north south for over 100 kilometres (62 mi). At the opposite side of the Cumberland Plain the Hornsby Plateau is fronted by the Hornsby Warp. That warp is topographically subtle in comparison to the Lapstone Structural Complex, and it is a feature which is poorly defined and inadequately defined in literature.

The Prospect dolerite intrusion in western Sydney is the largest assemblage of igneous rock in the Plain. The oval-shaped ridge was made many millions of years ago when volcanic material from the Earth's core actuated upwards and then sideways. Slow erosion of the overlying layers of sedimentary rock by the flow of rainwater have eventually laid bare the edges of the volcanic and metamorphic rocks of the intrusion. The western suburbs lie on the relatively flat, lowly elevated parts of the Cumberland Plain. Though there are a few hilly or relatively elevated regions on the plain. Western Sydney Parklands and the surrounding suburbs (such as Cecil Hills and Horsley Park), for instance, lie on a prominent ridge that is between 130 and 140 metres (430 and 460 ft) high.

Bringelly Shale and Minchinbury Sandstone are often seen in the Plain's west. Ashfield Shale is observed in the inner western suburbs. These components are part of the Wianamatta Shale group. Structurally, the Cumberland Basin underlying the plain is subdivided into several smaller basins, including the Fairfield Basin in the east and the Penrith Basin farther west. The Fairfield Basin is a broad synclinal structure in which substantial thicknesses of the Wianamatta Group have been preserved.

=== Soils ===
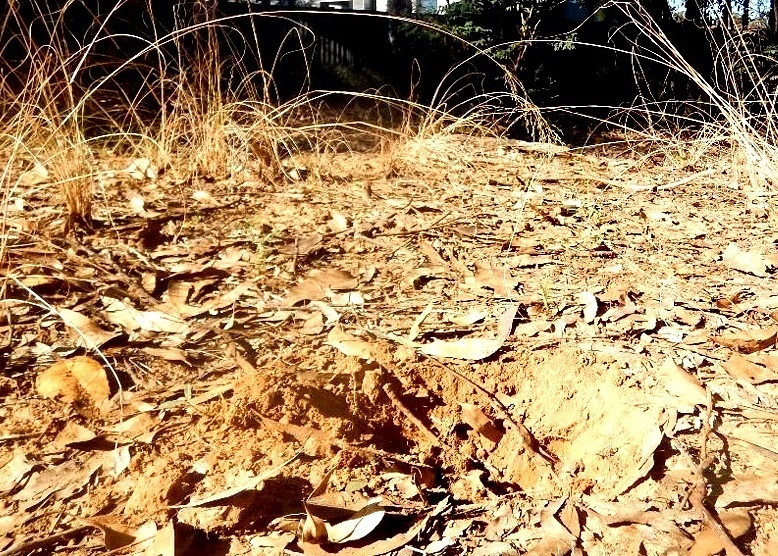
Exposed reddish-brown clay-rich soil of the Cumberland Lowlands in Western Sydney.

The soils of the Cumberland Plain, particularly the Cumberland Lowlands, are closely associated with the underlying geology and the region's gently undulating topography. They are predominantly clay-rich and generally have low to moderate natural fertility, with red, brown and yellow soils widespread across the plain. Red to brown clays also occur over volcanic rocks, while older gravel deposits may support relatively poor and stony soils. More recent floodplain alluvium can support higher-quality loams, although soils on some confluent valley floors are coarser and may be affected by salinity.

Much of the Cumberland Lowlands is occupied by the Blacktown soil landscape, a residual landscape formed in situ through the weathering of Wianamatta Group rocks. It occurs extensively across western and south-western Sydney, including around Blacktown, Mount Druitt, Fairfield and Leppington. The Blacktown landscape is characterised by broad, rounded ridges and crests separated by gently inclined slopes, with local relief generally between 10 and 30 metres (33 and 98 ft). Slopes are usually gentle but may reach gradients of approximately 10 per cent, and natural exposures of the underlying shale are uncommon except where the soil cover has been removed. Soil characteristics vary with topographic position. Red and brown podzolic soils occur mainly on crests and upper slopes, grading into deeper yellow podzolic soils on lower slopes and around drainage lines. Under the Australian Soil Classification, many of the strongly acidic, texture-contrast soils of the Cumberland Lowlands correspond broadly to Kurosols, while Sodosols and related soil types also occur.

A typical Blacktown soil profile exhibits a pronounced vertical change in texture. The surface A horizon may comprise up to approximately 30 centimetres (12 in) of friable brownish-black loam or clay loam, commonly containing plant roots and ranging from moderately acidic to neutral. Its colour may vary from brownish black to dark reddish or yellowish brown, and small iron-rich or weathered shale fragments may be present. Beneath it is commonly a 10-to-30-centimetre (3.9 to 11.8 in) hardsetting brown clay loam or silty clay loam forming an A2 horizon. This layer becomes hard when thoroughly dried and can become water-repellent under extremely dry conditions; it is generally moderately to slightly acidic and may contain iron-indurated fragments of weathered shale.

Below the A horizons is a marked transition to a clay-rich B horizon. The upper subsoil consists principally of strongly structured brown light to medium clay, generally becoming heavier with depth. Red, yellow and grey mottling is common and tends to increase farther down the profile, while pH generally ranges from about 4.5 to 6.5. At greater depths, particularly on middle and lower slopes, the brown clay commonly grades into light grey, highly plastic and mottled silty or heavy clay immediately above weathered shale bedrock. This deeper material is generally strongly acidic, with recorded pH values of approximately 4.0–5.5, and may contain weathered ironstone concretions and shale fragments.The depth of these soils varies considerably according to topographic position. Profiles on ridges and crests are commonly less than 1 metre (3.3 ft) deep, with the surface horizons overlying as much as 90 centimetres (35 in) of mottled brown clay. On upper and middle slopes they may approach 2 metres (6.6 ft), while lower side-slopes can support profiles exceeding 2 metres (6.6 ft) in depth. The latter may contain thick horizons of mottled brown clay over more than 1 metre (3.3 ft) of light grey plastic clay.

The Blacktown soils generally have low to moderate available water capacity and low cation-exchange capacity, while available phosphorus and nitrogen concentrations are also low. Where present, the dark loamy surface horizon is comparatively more fertile because of its higher organic matter and nitrogen content. The clay-rich subsoils contain little organic matter and may locally be sodic, saline and poorly permeable, while their strong acidity can result in elevated aluminium levels. The dense subsoil also restricts drainage, and seasonal waterlogging can occur in lower-lying areas. Deeper clay profiles are moderately reactive and undergo shrink–swell movement in response to changing moisture levels. Although erosion is generally limited under intact vegetation, exposed dispersive or sodic subsoils can be considerably more susceptible to erosion where surface runoff is concentrated. Along creek valleys and drainage depressions, the residual Blacktown soils grade into the alluvial South Creek soil landscape, where sediments have been deposited and reworked by the drainage systems of the Cumberland Plain. Smaller areas of the Luddenham and Picton soil landscapes occur where relief and slope increase. The Cumberland Lowlands therefore exhibit a broad topographic soil sequence, from comparatively shallow red and brown texture-contrast soils on ridges and upper slopes to deeper, more strongly mottled yellow and grey clay-rich soils downslope, followed by alluvial soils along major waterways.

=== Rivers ===
Rivers in the Cumberland Plain are prominent. The Nepean River rises to the south in the Woronora Plateau, and wraps around the western edge of the city. Parramatta River's headwaters are several local creeks including Toongabbie Creek and Hunts Creek, part of the upper Parramatta river catchment area. Hunt's creek flows from Lake Parramatta, a few kilometres North of Parramatta. Warragamba River flows 3.5 kilometres (2.2 mi) north-east from the Warragamba Dam spillway to its confluence with the Nepean River.

The south and southwest of Sydney is drained by the Georges River, flowing north from its source near Appin, towards Liverpool and then turning east towards Botany Bay. The other major tributary of Botany Bay is the Cooks River, running through the inner-south western suburbs of Canterbury and Tempe. The Georges River estuary separates the main part of Sydney's urban area from the Sutherland Shire. The Woronora River, on the southern edge of the Sydney Plain, flows in a steep-sided valley from the Woronora Dam to the eastern estuary of the Georges River.

Minor waterways draining Sydney's western suburbs include South Creek and Eastern Creek, flowing into the Hawkesbury, and Prospect Creek draining into the Georges River.

== Ecology ==
=== Wildlife ===
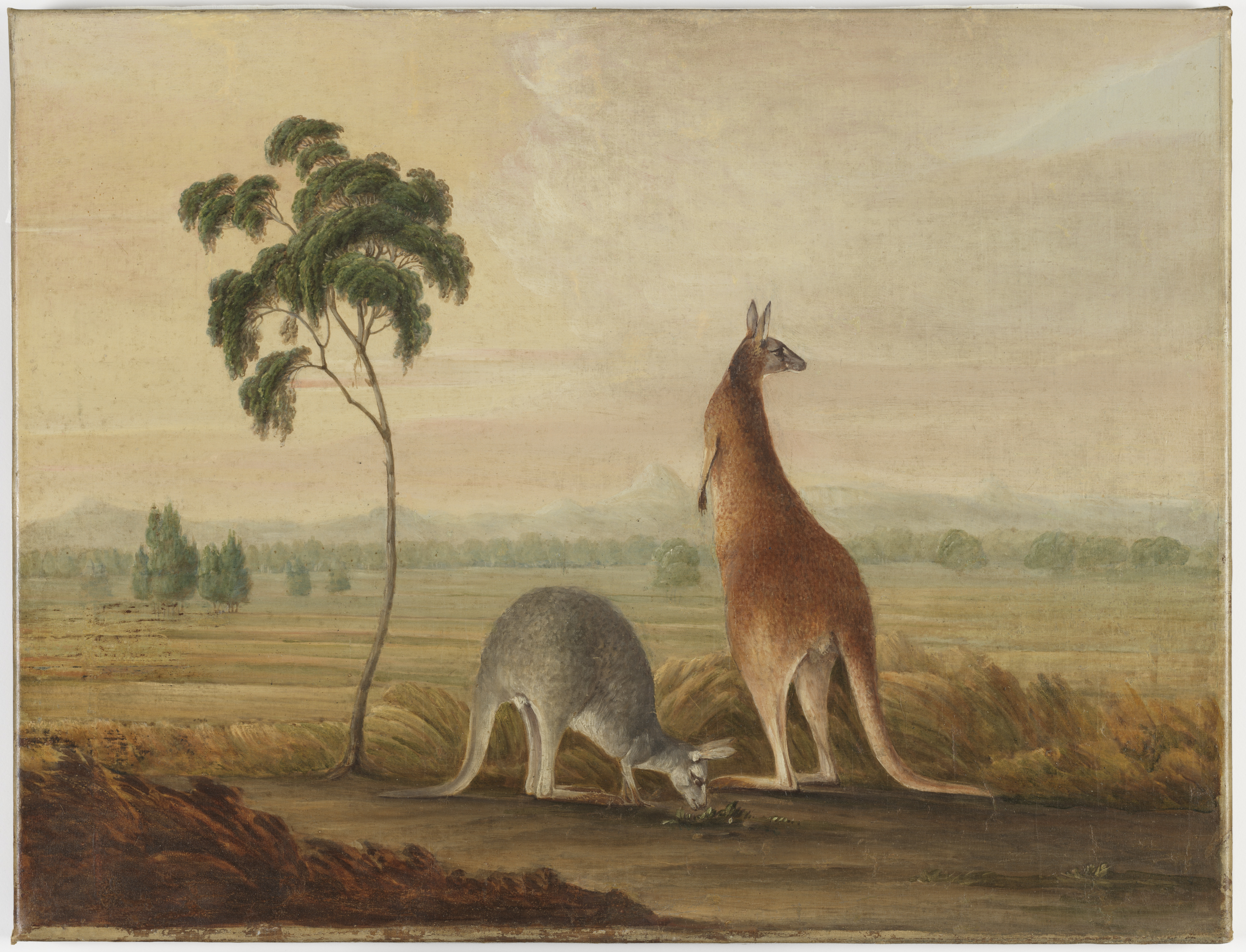
Grassy woodlands with kangaroos in Liverpool, c. 1819

The Cumberland Plain is home to a variety of bird, insect, reptile and mammal species, including bats. Arachnid, amphibian and crustacean species are also present.

About 40 species of reptiles are found in the Cumberland Plain. 30 bird species exist in the urban areas, with the common ones being the Australian magpie, Australian raven, noisy miner and the pied currawong. Introduced birds include the common mynah, common starling and the house sparrow.

Around 40 mammal species are loosely present amongst the plain, some now increasingly rare in the region. Common species being those of bats, with roughly 24 species living or visiting the Cumberland plain, macropods and possums. The outskirts of the Cumberland Plain, such as those adjacent to large parks, have a great diversity of wildlife.

=== Vegetation ===
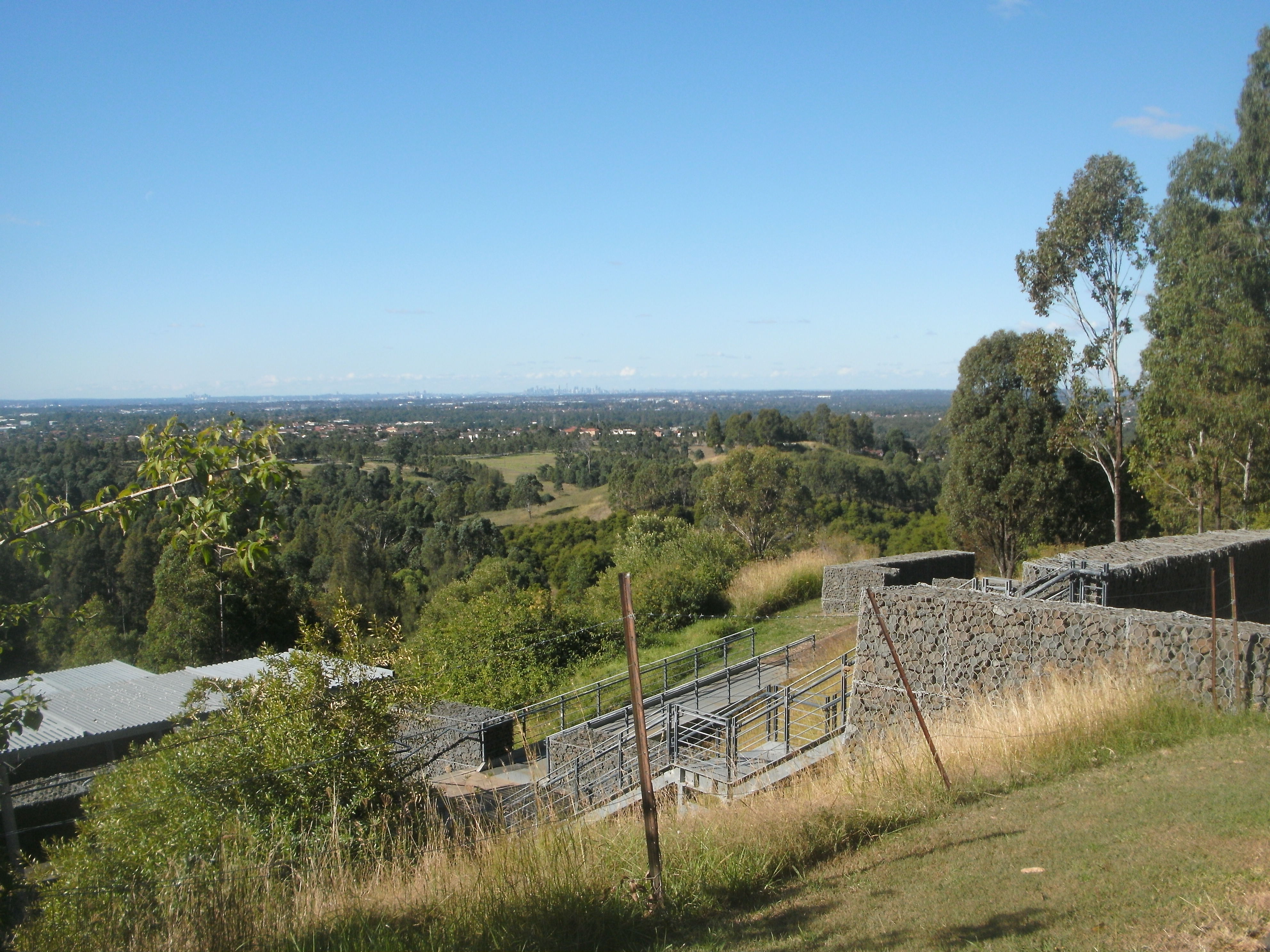
The Cumberland Plain as viewed from the summit of Western Sydney Regional Park in Horsley Park.

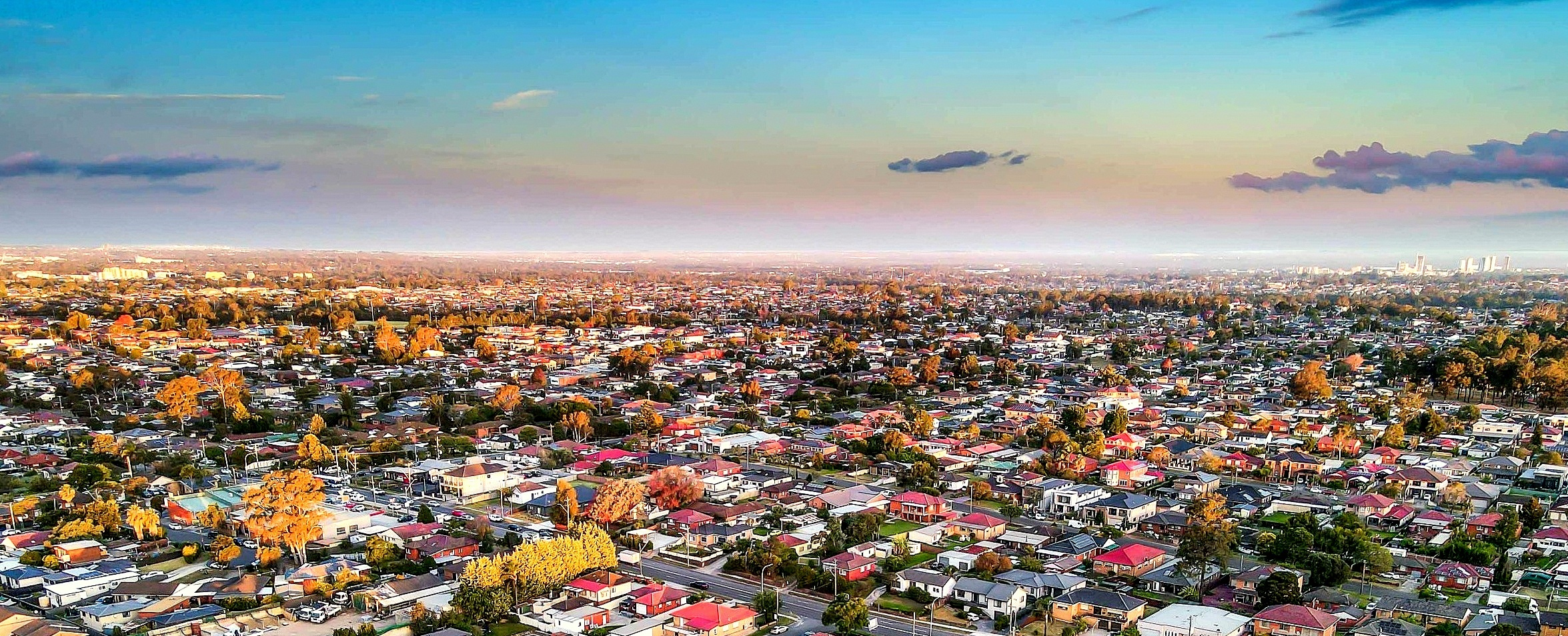
Overlooking South Western Sydney, with Fairfield on the far left, and the Liverpool skyline on the far right

The most predominant plant communities in the Cumberland Plain are grassy sclerophyll woodlands (or savannas), with over 830 native species. Dry and wet sclerophyll forests generally lie on the Hornsby plateau, an elevated region north of the Plain. Dry sclerophyll forests contain eucalyptus trees which are usually in open woodlands that have dry shrubs and sparse grass in the understory. Only 12% of the original vegetation remains.

In 1820s, Peter Cunningham described the country west of Parramatta and Liverpool as "a fine timbered country, perfectly clear of bush, through which you might, generally speaking, drive a gig in all directions, without any impediment in the shape of rocks, scrubs, or close forest". This confirmed earlier accounts by Governor Arthur Phillip, who suggested that the trees were "growing at a distance of some twenty to forty feet from each other, and in general entirely free from brushwood..."

=== Vegetation communities ===
Cumberland Plain features three main plant communities:

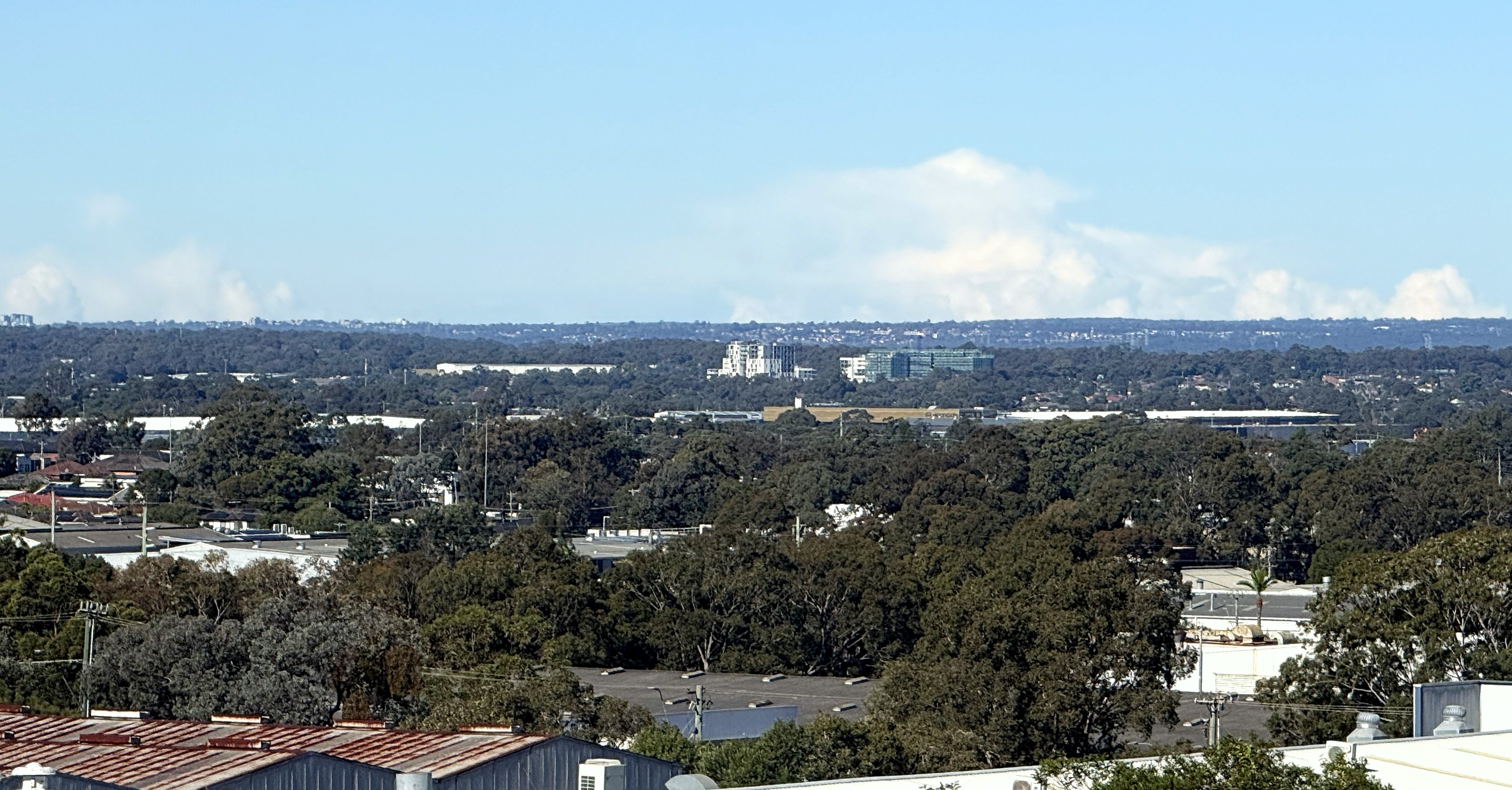
Looking southeast from Greystanes across the plain, with the Smithfield industrial zone in the foreground, the Yennora industrial zone in the centre, Yennora's residential area to the centre-right, the canopy of Mirambeena Regional Park in Lansdowne beyond, and the skyline of Villawood in the centre.

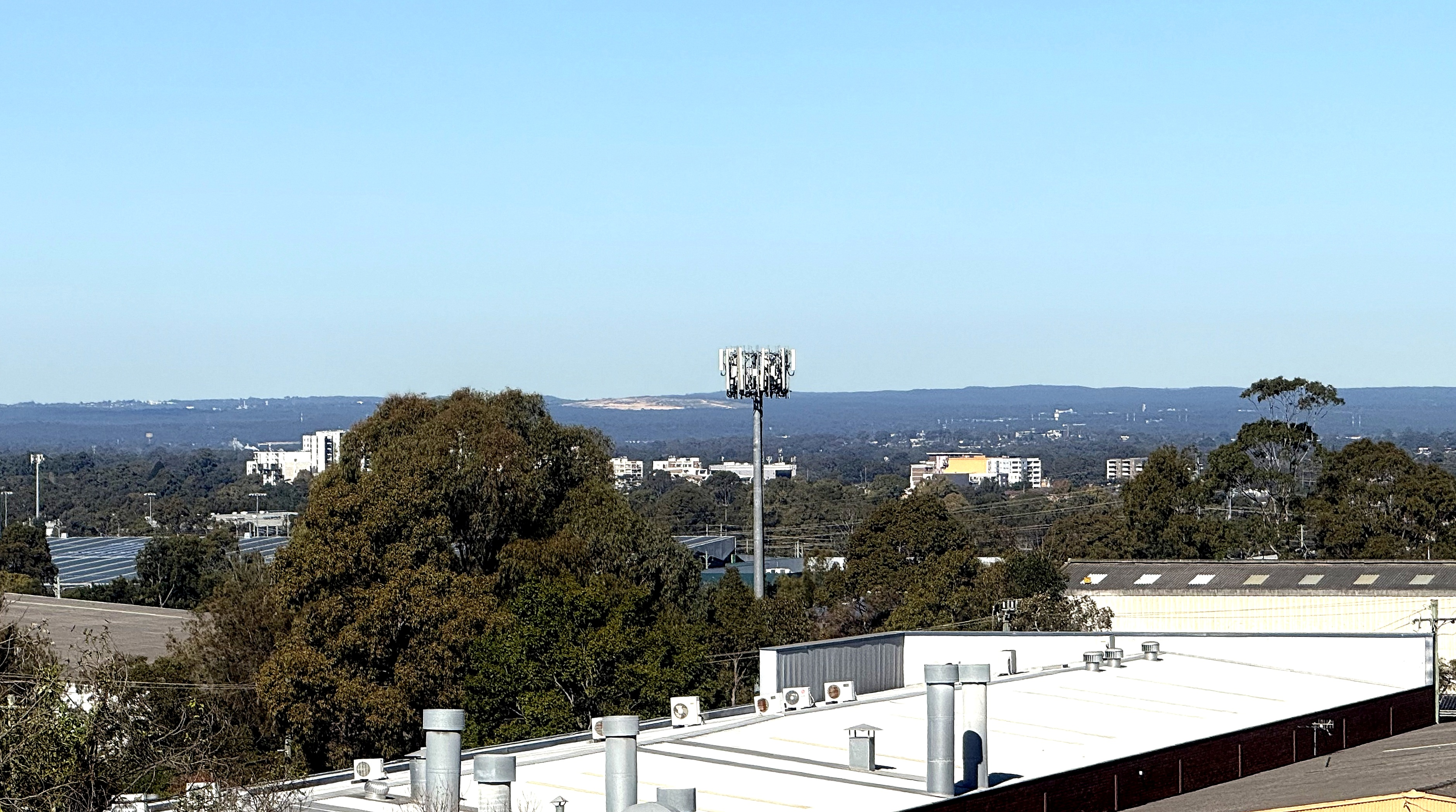
South-west view of the Cumberland Plain from Greystanes, with the Fairfield CBD skyline in the centre and Lucas Heights in the far distance.

- Cumberland Plain Woodland, which is filled with heavy clay soils and merges the Shale Hills Woodland and Shale Plains Woodland subcommunities. Original extent was 125,446 ha, and now only 11,054 ha or 8.8% of original extent remains.
  - Shale Plains Woodland occurs in the flat, low rainfall areas where it grades into Shale Hills Woodland at higher elevations to the south.
  - Moist Shale Woodland is found in wetter areas, mostly on the upper component of very steep sheltered slopes. Originally at 2,034 ha, it is now at 604 ha (or 29.7% of original extent).
- Shale Sandstone Transition Forest is found at the edges of the Cumberland Plain, in an area with relatively low rainfall (800mm-900mm), that features moderately tall eucalyptus forest. It is linked with the subtle transition between clay-rich shale soil and the rough sandy matter of the sandstone plateau. It is present on the western bounds of the Woronora Plateau and above the Nepean and Georges rivers near Appin, through Ingleburn to the west of the Woronora Plateau and the Holsworthy defence area. It is a modestly tall eucalyptus forest with a mixed understorey of sclerophyll shrubs and grasses with some sparse blanket of tall casuarinas (Allocasuarina littoralis and Allocasuarina torulosa). Its ground cover contains varies species of shrubs that are common on shale substrates such as blackthorn (Bursaria spinosa) and those linked with sandstone soils such as geebungs (Persoonia).
- Sydney Coastal River-flat Forest, which is present on the damper and the more fertile deposits near creeks and rivers. This community includes Alluvial Woodland and Riparian Forest ecoregions. Original or pre-1750 extent was 39,162 ha. Now only 5,446 hectares, or 13.9% of original extent still remains in the land.
- Cooks River/Castlereagh Ironbark ecological community is a 1,101-hectare (2,721-acre) area of dry sclerophyll open-forest to low woodland/scrubland which occurs between Castlereagh and Holsworthy, as well as around the headwaters of the Cooks River. The woodland is dominated by broad-leaved Ironbark (Eucalyptus fibrosa) and Paperbark (Melaleuca decora).

The Western Sydney Dry Rainforest is oftentimes found in sheltered gullies within the Cumberland Plain woodland, where it was originally 1,282 ha in size, but now only 338 ha remains. On the eastern peripheries of the plain, Shale Plains Woodland morphs into Turpentine-Ironbark Forest where the annual rainfall surpasses 950 mm. Rising to the Hornsby Plateau, the Turpentine-Ironbark Forest transitions into Blue Gum High Forest where the precipitation is above 1050 mm. Three discrete communities are acknowledged on margins of the plain, which are Shale Sandstone Transition Forest, High Sandstone Influence sub-communities and the Turpentine-Ironbark Margin Forest, which is present on the bounds of the Hornsby and Woronora Plateaus. Four communities were found on two isolated alluvial deposits in the northwest (Castlereagh) and southeast (Holsworthy) corners of the plain. These were, Cooks River/Castlereagh Ironbark Forest at 1,012 ha, which occur on soils with a high clay content, and Castlereagh Scribbly Gum Woodland being more common on sandy loam soils.

Castlereagh Swamp Woodland is found in poorly drained slumps in the Holsworthy and Castlereagh areas. Wind-blown deposits in the section of Agnes Banks support a defined assemblage of hard-leaved species known as Agnes Banks Woodland, at 615 ha. On the margins of the alluvial sedimentation, Castlereagh Ironbark Forest transitions into Shale Gravel Transition Forest on separated alluvium superimposed on Wianamatta Shale, which is currently at 1,721 ha. The scarcest community on the Cumberland Plain is Elderslie Banksia Scrub Forest, at 13.4 ha, which is present on the deep sand deposition of the old alluvial rows of the Nepean River near Camden, where it morphs with Cumberland Plain Woodland and Sydney Coastal Riverflat Forest. The Riparian Forest, such as Coastal Swamp Oak Forest, is restricted to streams and adjoining swampy areas, and is closely related to Castlereagh Swamp Woodland when it comes to the floral species. Furthermore, Alluvial Woodland occurs on large floodplains more than 100 metres away from a river, where they transition into Shale Plains Woodland.

Apart from these aforementioned woodland communities, another 11 vegetation communities are found scattered on the Cumberland Plain:

- Castlereagh Scribbly Gum Woodland
- Sandstone Ridgetop Woodland
- Upper Georges River Sandstone Woodland
- Western Sandstone Gully Forest
- Mangrove/Saltmarsh Complex
- Riparian Scrub
- Coastal Swamp Oak Forest
- Freshwater Wetlands
- Eastern Gully Forest
- Woodland Heath Complex
- Vegetation of Volcanic Substrates

==== Protection ====
Under Federal environmental legislation, six of the above ecological communities are protected as four "matters of national environmental significance". Some are grouped together into broader communities that share similarities in landscape position, structure and/or species.

The four nationally defined and protected threatened ecological communities are: Blue Gum High Forest of the Sydney Basin Bioregion; Cumberland Plain Shale Woodlands and Shale-Gravel Transition Forest; Shale/Sandstone Transition Forest; Turpentine-Ironbark Forest in the Sydney Basin Bioregion; and Western Sydney Dry Rainforest and Moist Woodland on Shale. The plain has 300 different native plants and is home to over 20 threatened bird and animals.

Cumberland Plain communities are protected in a number of council reserves, plus the Lower Prospect Canal Reserve, Scheyville National Park, Windsor Downs Nature Reserve, Leacock Regional Park and Mulgoa Nature Reserve and Mount Annan Botanic Garden. Cumberland Plain Woodland, of which around six per cent remains in isolated stands, was the first Australian ecological community to be assigned this status.

== Agriculture ==
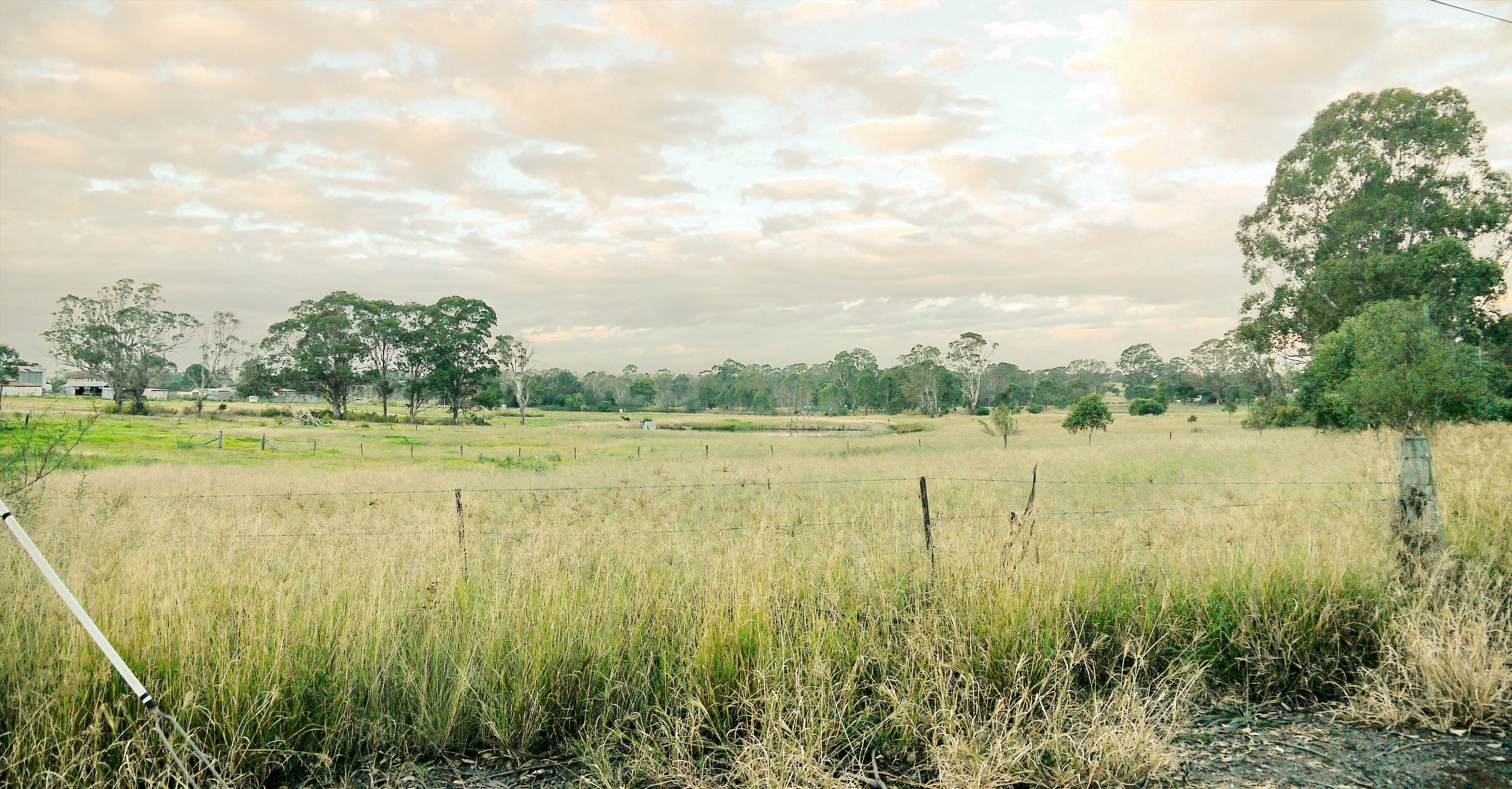
A countryside in Western Sydney with an open bushland.

The western portion of the Cumberland Plain mainly consists of sparsely populated, vast, rural grasslands with undulating hills and scenic vistas. The Sydney western suburbs of Mount Vernon, Kemps Creek, Orchard Hills, Luddenham, Mulgoa, Bringelly, Silverdale and Horsley Park, among others, lie in this agricultural countryside, adjacent to the footsteps of the Blue Mountains westwards of these country plains.

Furthermore, Abbotsbury, Cecil Hills and Glenmore Park were farms through until the 1980s when it was decided to redevelop them for housing. The area around the site of Regentville has remained largely rural, if hemmed in somewhat by the modern residential suburbs of Jamisontown and Glenmore Park.

In the 1800s, John Blaxland built an original wooden weir at "Grove Farm" (now known as Wallacia) for a sandstone flour mill and additional brewery. The land was also used for wheat farming until 1861 when wheat rust infected the entire crop. The rural regions were chiefly one of dairying and grazing during the 19th century, but in the early 20th century – because of its rural atmosphere and proximity to Sydney – tourism developed as people opened their homes as guest houses. Today, the rural areas include a number of orchards and vineyards in the meadows. Vegetable farming and fruit picking are common activities.

== See also ==
- Sydney Basin
- Climate of Sydney
- Geography of Sydney
