= Elderslie Banksia Scrub Forest =

Indigenous woodland community in Sydney, Australia

Coordinates: 34°5′27″S 150°43′5″E

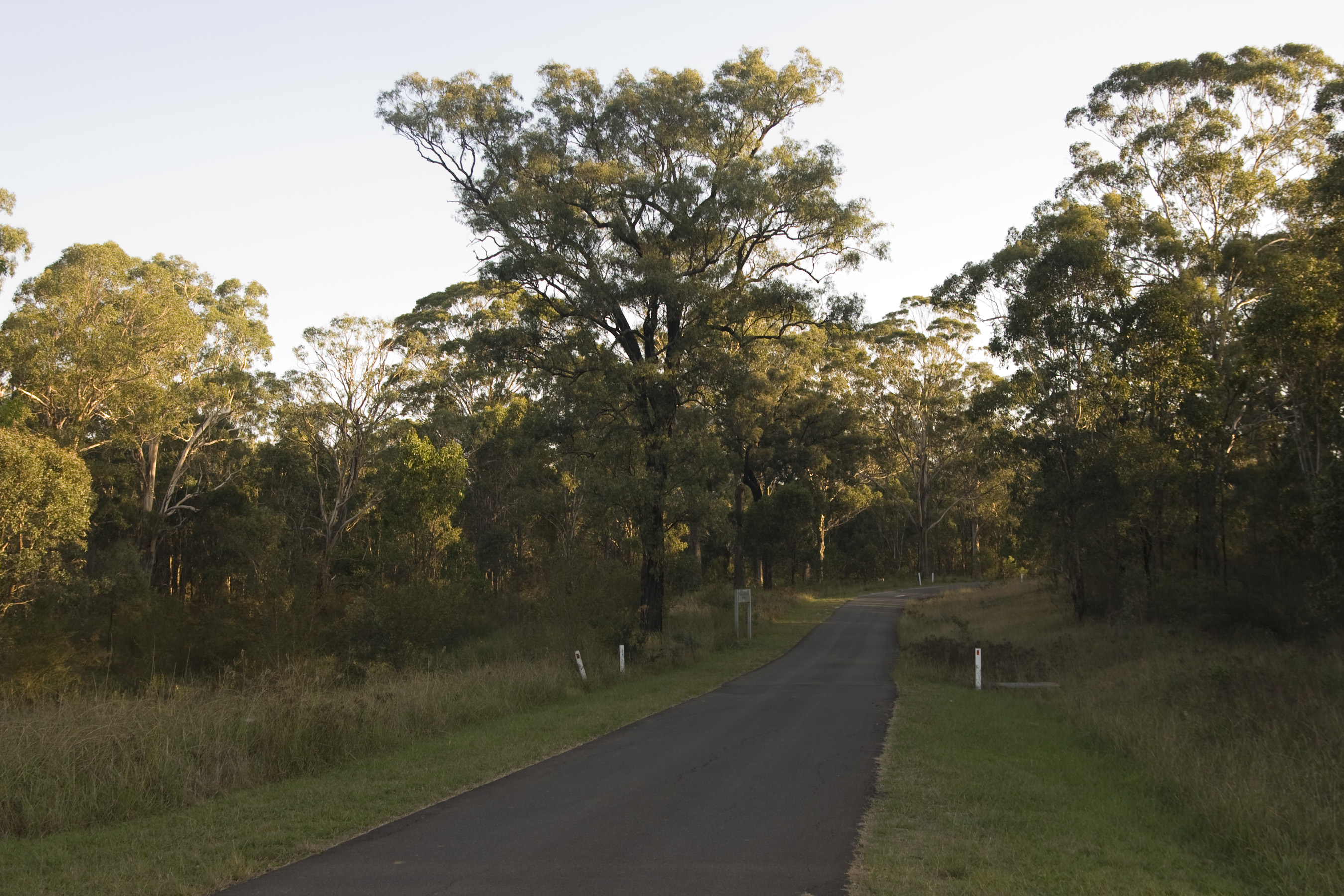
- Some of the scrubby woodland preserved at Australian Botanic Garden Mount Annan

Ecology
- Realm: Australasia
- Biome: Temperate grasslands, savannas, and shrublands
- Borders: Shale Sandstone Transition Forest; Cumberland Plain Woodland

Geography
- Area: 0.13 km^{2} (0.050 sq mi)
- Country: Australia
- Elevation: 60–100 metres (200–330 ft)
- Geology: Sandstone, shale
- Climate type: Humid subtropical climate (Cfa)
- Soil types: Clay, sand

The Elderslie Banksia Scrub Forest is a critically endangered scrubby woodland situated in southwestern Sydney, New South Wales, Australia. Listed under the Environment Protection and Biodiversity Conservation Act 1999, it is a variety of stunted forest or woodland found on sandy substrates associated with deep Tertiary sand deposits, which has been reduced in extent of at least 90% of its original pre-European extent.

== Geography ==
It is situated in the present day Nepean River floodplain, chiefly in the Camden area within the Macarthur region of south-western Sydney and is related to the coastal sand and sandstone plateau areas of the state. It lies on an area with low-nutrient, heavy clayey sands where Tertiary alluvium sit on another substrate – generally Triassic age sedimentary strata of the Wianamatta Group, around the location of Spring Farm. Lying on the Cumberland Plain, the extent of the community ranges from about 13 ha to less than 15 ha. The area receives around 750 mm of rainfall annually.

== Flora ==
Named after the suburb of Elderslie, the community features species such as Banksia integrifolia, Angophora subvelutina, Eucalyptus baueriana, Eucalyptus amplifolia, and Eucalyptus tereticornis, Eucalyptus botryoides x Eucalyptus saligna (a natural hybrid) and assorted other species of Eucalyptus over a largely shrubby understorey species such as Melaleuca decora and Melaleuca linariifolia.

The ground layer includes Dianella caerulea, Dianella revoluta, Gahnia clarkei, Gleichenia dicarpa, Hibbertia diffusa and Pteridium esculentum.

== Fauna ==
Amphibians include Limnodynastes dumerilii, Limnodynastes peronii, Limnodynastes tasmaniensis, and Crinia signifera.

Birds include Anthochaera carunculata, Cacatua galerita, Cacatua sanguinea, Cracticus tibicen, Corvus coronoides, Eolophus roseicapillus, Eopsaltria australis, Dacelo novaeguineae and Malurus cyaneus, among many others.

Mammals species present are Tachyglossus aculeatus, Petaurus breviceps, Trichosurus vulpecula, Pseudocheirus peregrinus and Pteropus poliocephalus.
