= Geography of Sydney =

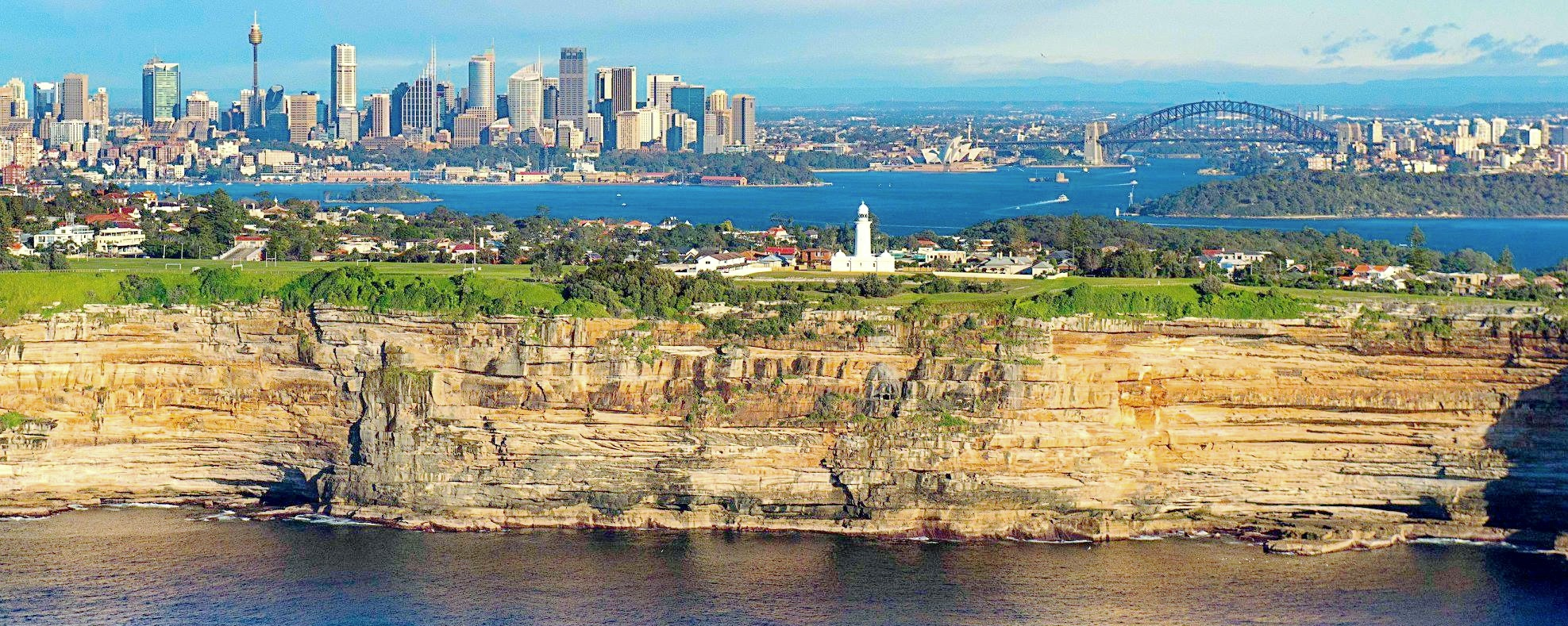
Sydney as viewed from Tasman Sea, overlooking the sandstone cliffs in Vaucluse

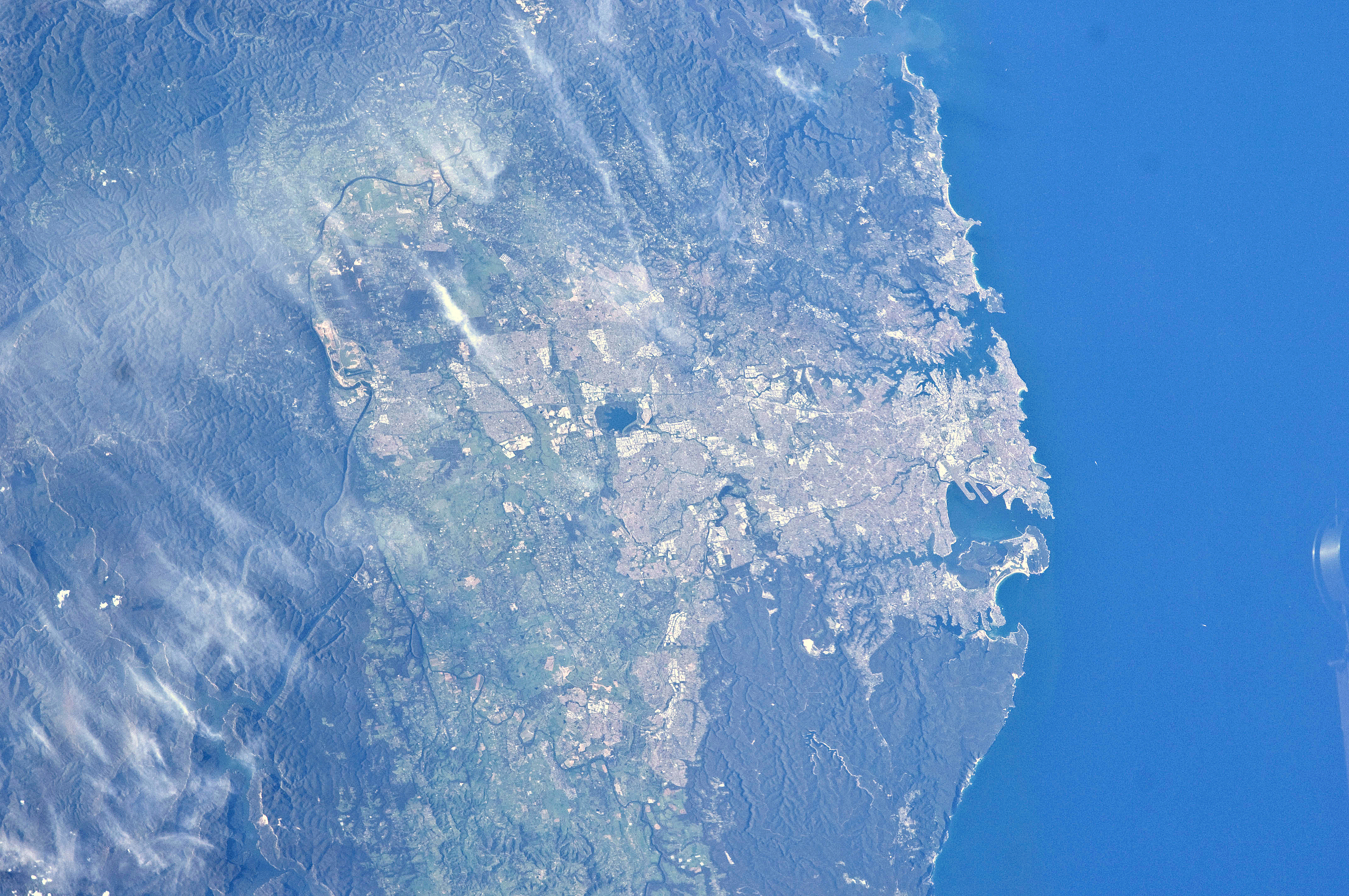
Satellite photo of the Sydney area

The geography of Sydney is characterised by its coastal location on a basin bordered by the Pacific Ocean to the east, the Blue Mountains to the west, the Hawkesbury River to the north and the Woronora Plateau to the south. Sydney lies on a submergent coastline on the east coast of New South Wales, where the ocean level has risen to flood deep river valleys (rias) carved in the Sydney sandstone. Port Jackson, better known as Sydney Harbour, is one such ria.

The Sydney area lies on Triassic shales and sandstones. The region mostly consists of low rolling hills and wide valleys in a rain shadow area that is shielded by the Great Dividing Range. Sydney sprawls over two major regions: the Cumberland Plain, a relatively flat region lying to the west of Sydney Harbour, and the Hornsby Plateau, a plateau north of the Harbour rising to 200 metres and dissected by steep valleys. Sydney's native plant species are predominantly eucalyptus trees, and its soils are usually red and yellow in texture. The endemic flora is home to a variety of bird, insect, reptile and mammal species, which are conspicuous in urban areas.

There are more than 70 harbour and ocean beaches in the urban area. Most of Sydney's water storages are on tributaries of the Nepean River. Parramatta River drains a large area of Sydney's western suburbs. With 5,005,400 inhabitants (as of 2016) and an urban population density of 2037 people per square kilometre, Sydney's urban area covers 1,788 km^{2} (690 sq mi), comprising 35% of Sydney and is constantly growing.

== Geology ==
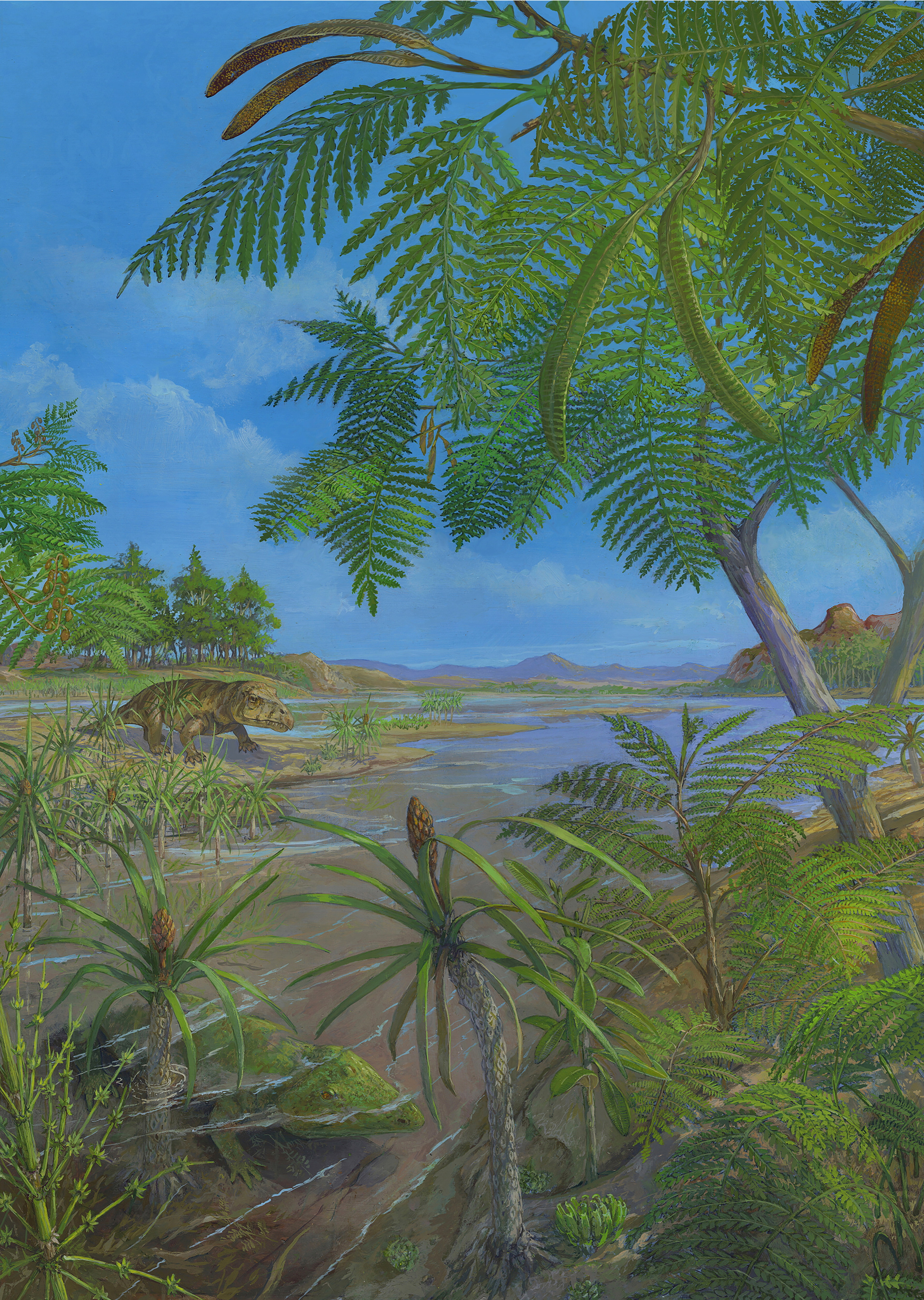
A paleoenvironmental (early Triassic) reconstruction of northern Sydney

The rising sea level between 18,000 and 6,000 years ago flooded the rias to form estuaries and deep harbours. Erosion by coastal streams has created a landscape of deep canyons and remnant plateaus. Sea level reached a highstand of approximately 1.5 metres (4.9 ft) above the present level around 7,400 years ago, inundating former river valleys and contributing to the formation of the modern Sydney Harbour estuary; sea level subsequently declined gradually towards its present position.

The city has fault lines which run considerably deep beneath the Sydney basin, dating back to when New Zealand started breaking away from Australia more than 85 million years ago. To the east the basin continues to the edge of the continental shelf. The edge of the Australian continental shelf lies about 25.9 km (16.1 mi) east of Sydney Heads, beyond which begins the Tasman Abyssal Plain. The centre of the basin is located around 30 kilometres (19 mi) west of the Sydney central business district at Fairfield.

At a time in the past, monocline formed to the west of Sydney. The monocline is a sloping bend that raises the sandstone well above where it is expected to be seen, and this is why the whole of the visible top of the Blue Mountains is made of sandstone. Sandstone slopes in the Sydney area are on three sides: to the west the Blue Mountains, and to the north and south, the Hornsby and Woronora plateaux'. During the age of dinosaurs, Australia separated from Gondwana and began a gradual northward drift driven by the movement of tectonic plates. Around 120 million years ago, New Zealand rifted away from Australia, opening the Tasman Sea and leaving the eastern margin of the continent with a steep, narrow continental shelf. Exposed to wave action and marine weathering, cliffs of Hawkesbury Sandstone progressively retreated, producing a highly indented coastline. This erosion left behind a broad, relatively flat rock platform that was subsequently mantled by sand delivered to the coast by ancient river systems.

The Eastern Suburbs landscape was already undergoing significant geological modification, characterised by widespread thrusting, bending, and folding. These processes progressively produced a broad, bowl-shaped structural depression now known as the Sydney Basin. Over time, the basin accumulated thick sequences of sediment transported by ancient river systems. Some of this material was organic in origin and was later transformed into coal, explaining the presence of coal seams at the surface to the north, south, and west of Sydney, while equivalent layers occur at depths of up to 900 metres beneath the Sydney region itself. The dominant deposit, however, was a sandstone unit approximately 300 metres thick, which lithified to form the Hawkesbury Sandstone that dominates much of the modern landscape.

Sydney features two major soils; sandy soils (such as red, brown and yellow podsols, grey and brown tenosols, lithosols, kandosols and kurosols) which originate from the Hawkesbury sandstone and have low fertility, and clay soils (which are from shales and volcanic rocks), though some soils may be a mixture of the aforementioned soils (such as sandy clay loams and silty clay loam). Sydney has a number of islands in its harbour and surrounding rivers. Such islands include, Shark Island, Cockatoo Island, Clark Island, Snapper Island, Spectacle Island and Goat Island in Port Jackson. Bare Island in Botany Bay. Lion Island, Long Island and Milson Island in Hawkesbury River. Scotland Island in the Northern Beaches. And Rodd Island in Parramatta River.

=== Hawkesbury sandstone ===
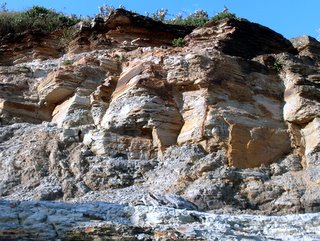
Virtually all of Sydney's exposed rocks are sandstone (Narrabeen Group of sedimentary rocks at Narrabeen).

Being very porous, the Sydney sandstone (also known as the Hawkesbury sandstone) has shale lenses and fossil riverbeds dotted throughout and it is some 200 metres (656 feet) thick. The sandstone was probably deposited in a freshwater delta and is the caprock which controls the erosion and scarp retreat of the Illawarra escarpment. Six kilometres of sandstone and shale lie under Sydney and there are volcanic rocks from low hills in the shale landscapes.. The sand that was to become the Hawkesbury sandstone of today was washed from Broken Hill and laid down about 200 million years ago. The ripple marks from the ancient river that brought the grains of sand are distinctive and easily seen, telling geologists that the sand comes from rocks formed between 500 and 700 million years ago far to the south. This means that the highest part of the visible lines almost always faces approximately south. The Basin's sedimentary rocks have been subject to uplift with gentle folding and minor faulting during the formation of the Great Dividing Range.

Sydney sandstone has commonly been interpreted as having formed within a large braided river system, similar in scale and depositional style to the modern Brahmaputra River in Bangladesh. The sands were deposited by a vast braided river system whose headwaters lay in Antarctica, at a time when Australia formed part of the supercontinent Gondwana and the Sydney region was situated at approximately 60° south latitude. During this period, no polar ice caps were present, and the climate was warm to hot, reflecting atmospheric carbon dioxide concentrations that were at least three times higher than those of today.

Bringelly Shale and Minchinbury Sandstone are often seen in the greater western parts of Sydney. Ashfield Shale is observed in the inner western suburbs. These components are part of the Wianamatta Shale group. Mittagong Formation sighted in a few areas in northern Sydney. The Prospect dolerite intrusion in western Sydney is the largest assemblage of igneous rock in Sydney. The oval-shaped ridge was made many millions of years ago when volcanic material from the Earth's upper mantle moved upwards and then sideways. Slow erosion of the overlying layers of sedimentary rock by the flow of rainwater have eventually laid bare the edges of the volcanic and metamorphic rocks of the intrusion. The Gap, an ocean cliff on the South Head peninsula in Watsons Bay, was laid as sediment more than 200 million years ago in the Triassic period. During the Jurassic period, a cataclysmic event resulted in an enormous crack forming within the strata. The Gap itself forms a sequence that continues offshore to the edge of the Sahul Shelf.

=== Rivers and creeks ===
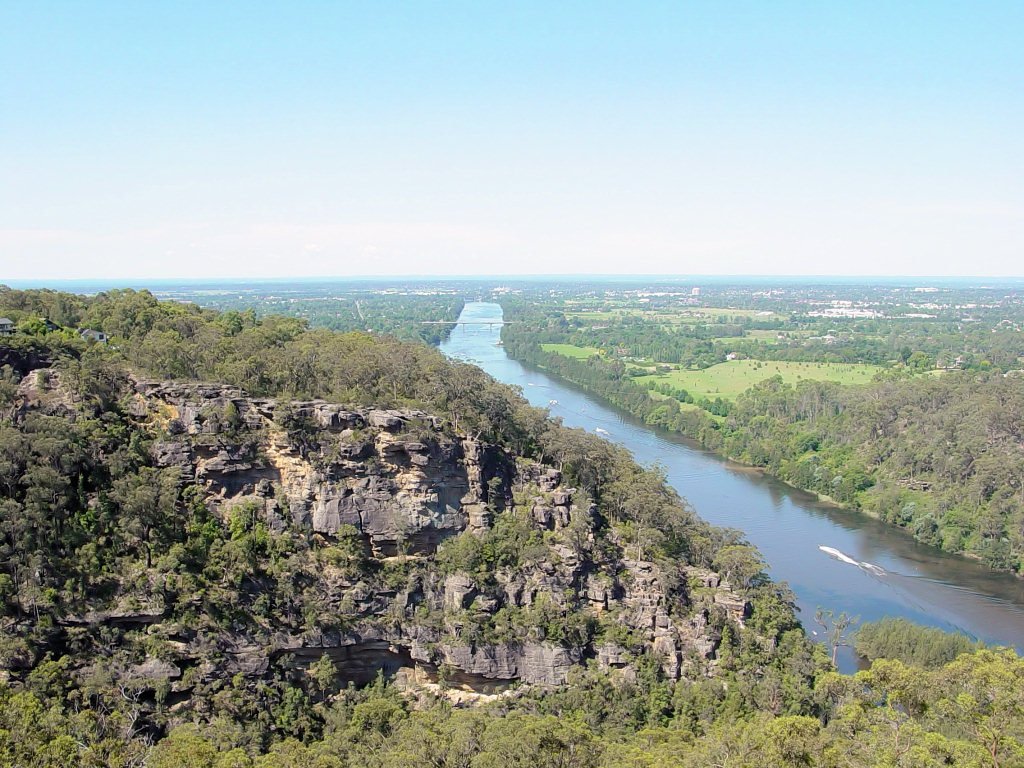
View of Nepean River from just south of Penrith

Overall, Sydney has nine rivers and just over a hundred creeks. The Nepean River rises to the south in the Woronora Plateau, and wraps around the western edge of the city. Swamps and lagoons are existent on the floodplain of the Nepean River, one being Bents Basin, which is also a recreational area. Where the Nepean turns east it becomes the Hawkesbury River, which winds through the Hornsby Plateau before emptying into Broken Bay. Broken Bay and the lower Hawkesbury form the commonly accepted boundary between Sydney and the Central Coast to the north. The remaining section of Warragamba River flows 3.5 kilometres (2.2 mi) north-east from the Warragamba Dam spillway to its confluence with the Nepean River.

The south and southwest of Sydney is drained by the Georges River, flowing north from its source near Appin, towards Liverpool and then turning east towards Botany Bay. The other major tributary of Botany Bay is the Cooks River, running through the inner-south western suburbs of Canterbury and Tempe. The Georges River estuary separates the main part of Sydney's urban area from the Sutherland Shire. The Woronora River, on the southern edge of the Sydney Plain, flows in a steep-sided valley from the Woronora Dam to the eastern estuary of the Georges River. The Hacking River is further south and runs through The Royal National Park into Port Hacking which forms the southern boundary of the Sutherland Shire.

Parramatta River's headwaters are several local creeks including Toongabbie Creek and Hunts Creek, part of the upper Parramatta river catchment area. Duck River is the river's southern tributary. Hunt's creek flows from Lake Parramatta, a few kilometres North of Parramatta. At east Parramatta the river becomes a tidal estuary that flows into Port Jackson, commonly known as Sydney harbour. Other major tributaries flow into Port Jackson from the North Shore and are the Lane Cove River and Middle Harbour Creek.

Minor waterways draining Sydney's western suburbs include South Creek and Eastern Creek, flowing into the Hawkesbury, and Prospect Creek draining into the Georges River. Cowan Creek and Berowra Creek run north from the Upper North Shore to the Hawkesbury river. The creeks draining into Georges River were described as "a chain of ponds" by the early European settlers, because these creeks were more like a series of ponds rather than an unbroken stream, before the disturbance of their banks by the settlers.

== Ecology ==
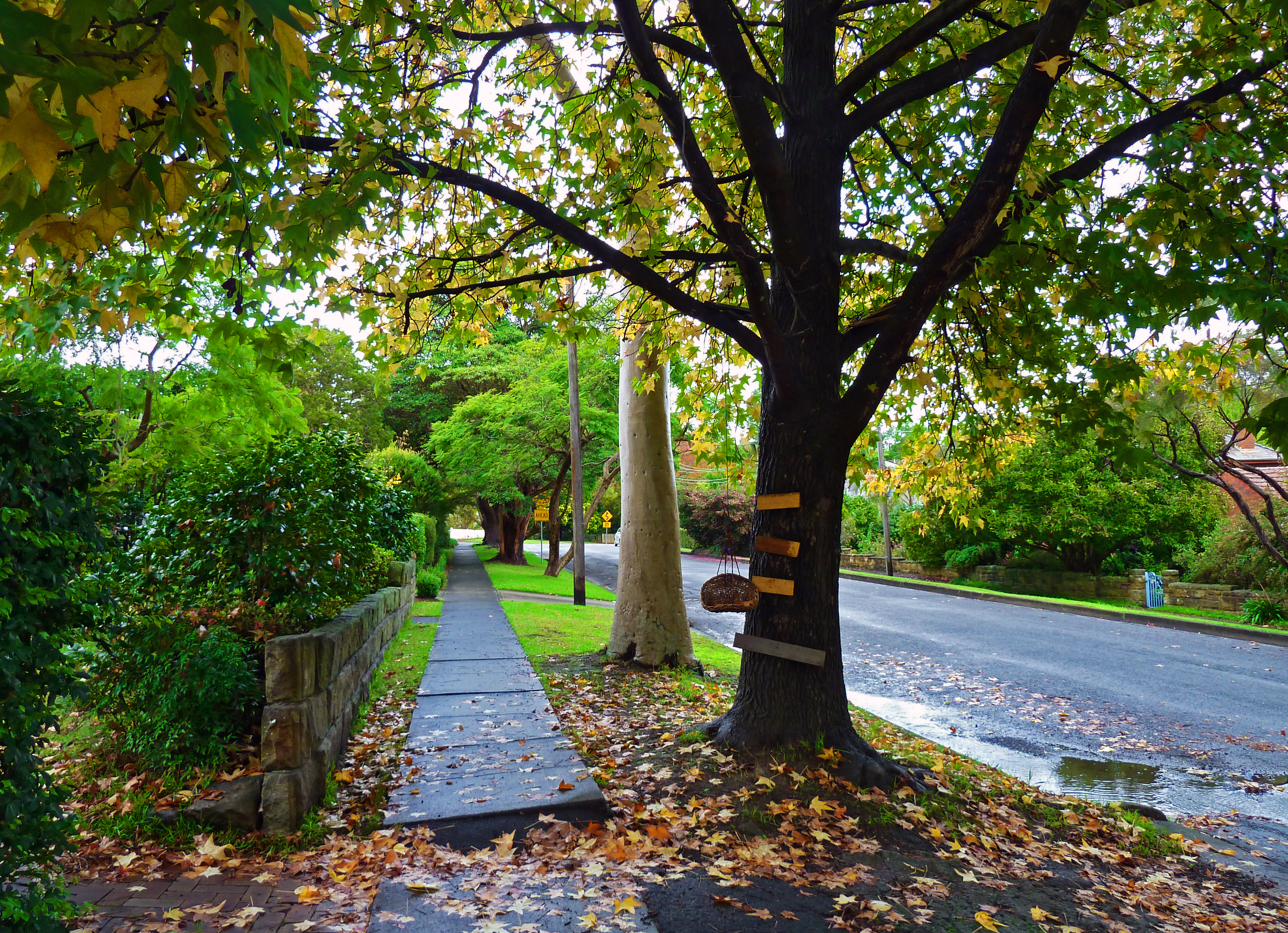
Parts of the North Shore and Northern Suburbs are filled with decorative street trees, including those with autumn foliage, earning the region the nickname "The Leafy North Shore".

The predominant plant communities in the Sydney region are grassy woodlands, which are open woodlands scattered with sclerophyllous shrubs and sparse grass in the understory. Wet and dry sclerophyll forest exist in some pockets, with heathlands and temperate/subtropical rainforests occurring in a few areas as well, thus making the Sydney region have distinct biomes. Dry sclerophyll forests, reminiscent of Mediterranean forests, are the most widespread forest type in the region, which occur sporadically in the Cumberland Plain and would feature dry, eucalyptus woodland. On the other hand, wet sclerophyll forests, which fall under temperate forests, have narrow, relatively tall, dense trees with a lush, moist understorey of fleecy shrubs and tree ferns. They are found in the cooler, wetter areas such as Northern Suburbs, Forest District, North Shore and in the Blue Mountains.

Sclerophyll forests developed as a result of the extreme age of the continent combined with Aboriginal fire use. Deep weathering of the crust leached chemicals out of the rock, leaving Australian soils deficient in nutrients. The sandstone is the basis of the nutrient-poor soils found in Sydney that developed over millennia and 'came to nurture a brilliant and immensely diverse array of plants'. As plants cannot afford to lose leaves to herbivores when nutrients are scarce, they defend their foliage with toxins. In eucalypts, these toxins give the bush its distinctive smell. It has been calculated that around 98,000 hectares of native vegetation remains in the Sydney metropolitan area, about half of what is likely to have been existing at the time of European arrival.

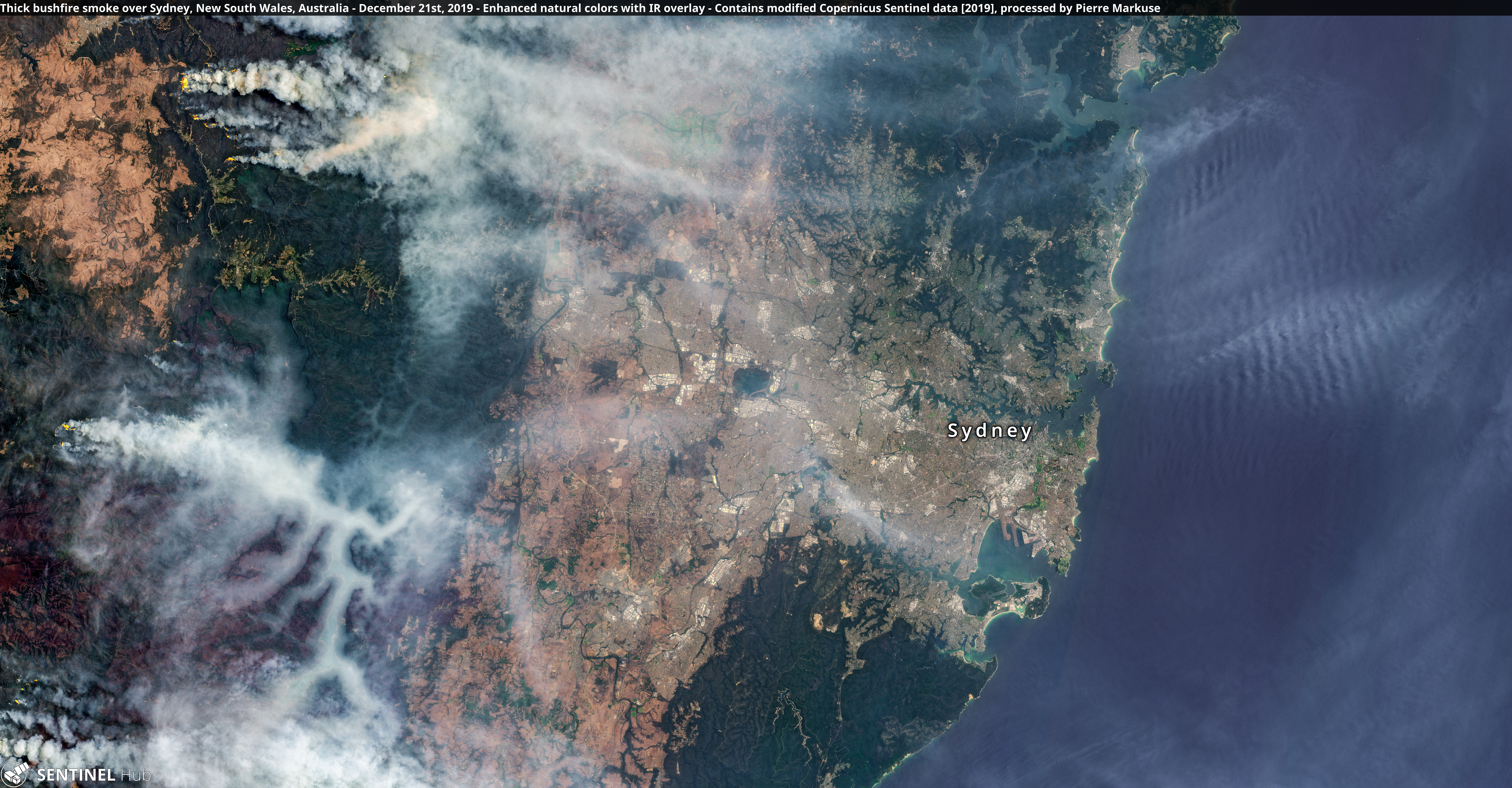
Bushfires semi-circling Sydney in a phenomenon known as "ring of fire".

Because the Sydney metropolitan area is encircled by a large area of bushland and forest to the north, west and south of its peripheries, bushfires can ring the region during intense bushfire seasons; this natural phenomenon that surrounds Sydney has been labelled "ring of fire".

According to the Senseable City Lab at the Massachusetts Institute of Technology (MIT), which measures urban canopy cover in the world's most prominent cities, the Sydney area had a Green View Index of 25.9% – This represents the total percentage of the city covered by urban trees. Tying with Vancouver at that percentage, Sydney is the third prominent city in the world with the most trees after Tampa (36.1%), Singapore (29.3%) and Oslo (28.8%), respectively. The City of Sydney has committed to planting at least five million trees by 2030 as part of a strategy to increase urban tree canopy by 40%.

=== Fauna ===
The fauna of the Sydney area is diverse and its urban area is home to variety of bird and insect species, and also a few bat, arachnid and amphibian species. Sydney is home to dozens of bird species, which mainly include the Australian white ibis, Australian raven, Australian magpie, crested pigeon, grey butcherbird, magpie lark, noisy miner, pied currawong, silver gull and willie wagtail, among others. Introduced birds such as the house sparrow, common myna and feral pigeon are ubiquitous in the CBD areas of Sydney.

Moreover, possums, bandicoots, rabbits, feral cats, lizards, snakes and frogs may also be present in the urban environment, albeit seldom in city centers.

== Topography ==
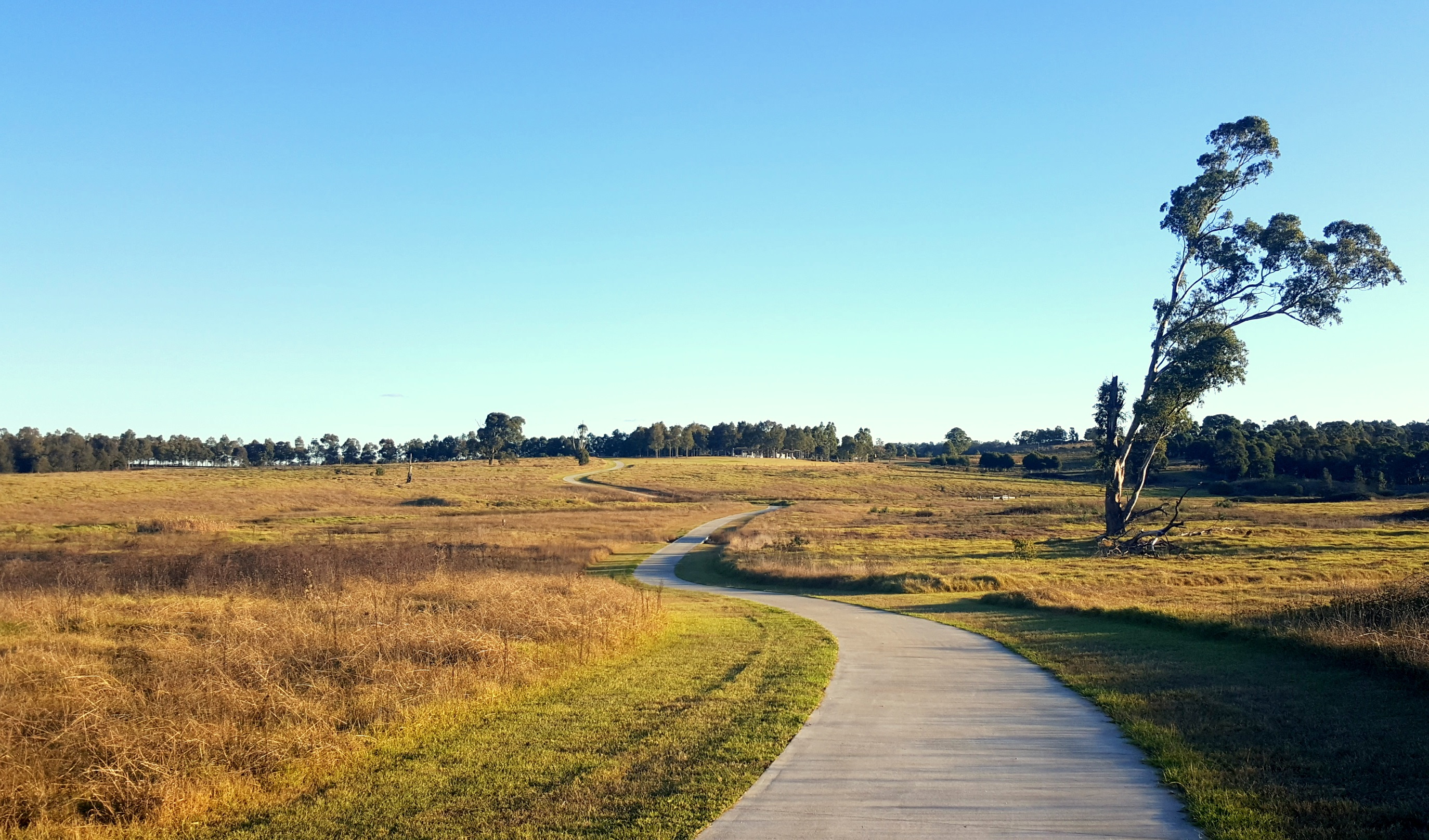
The topography of the greater west is primarily grassy woodlands.

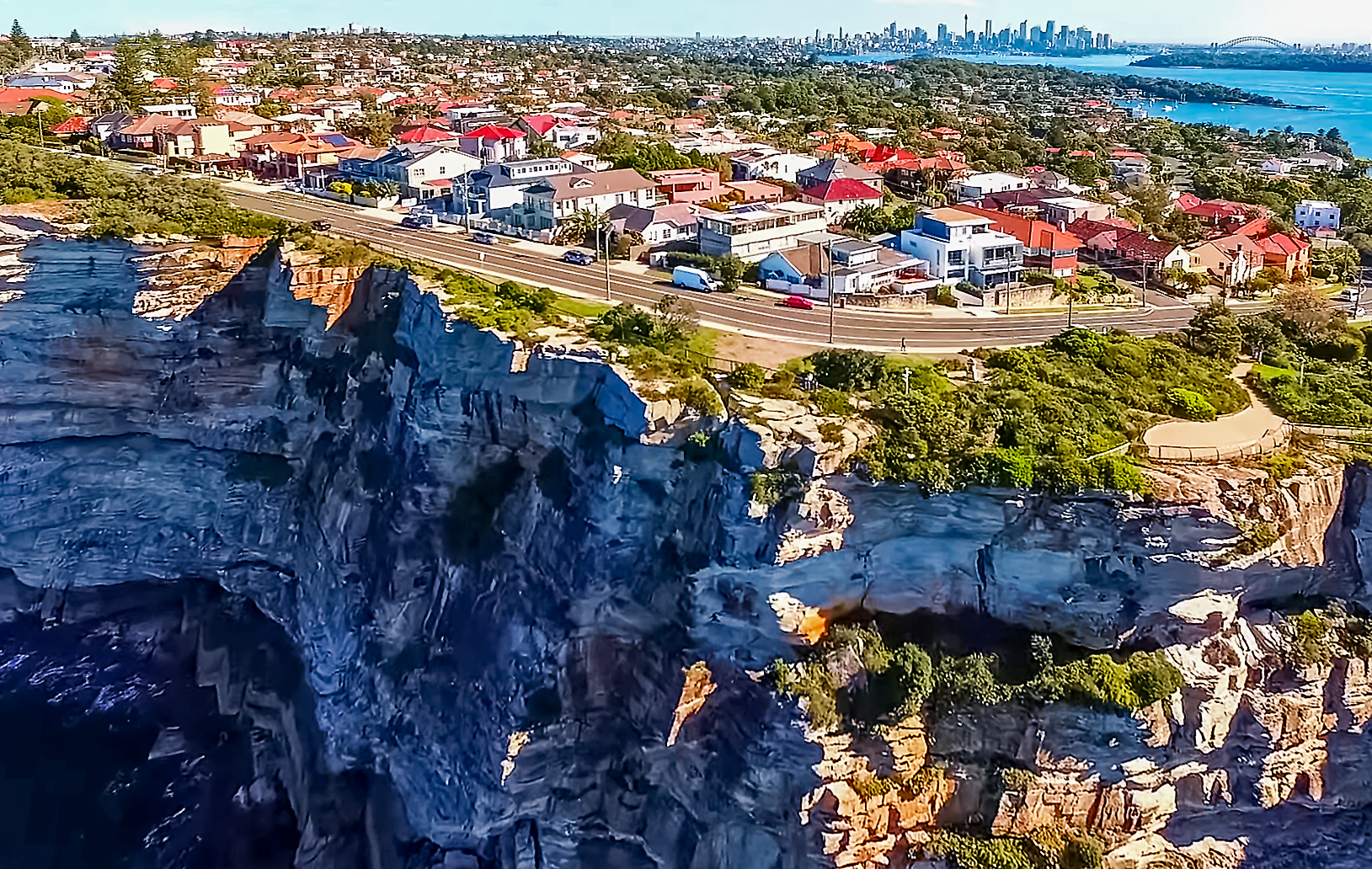
Eastern suburb of Vaucluse, which is situated on a clifftop

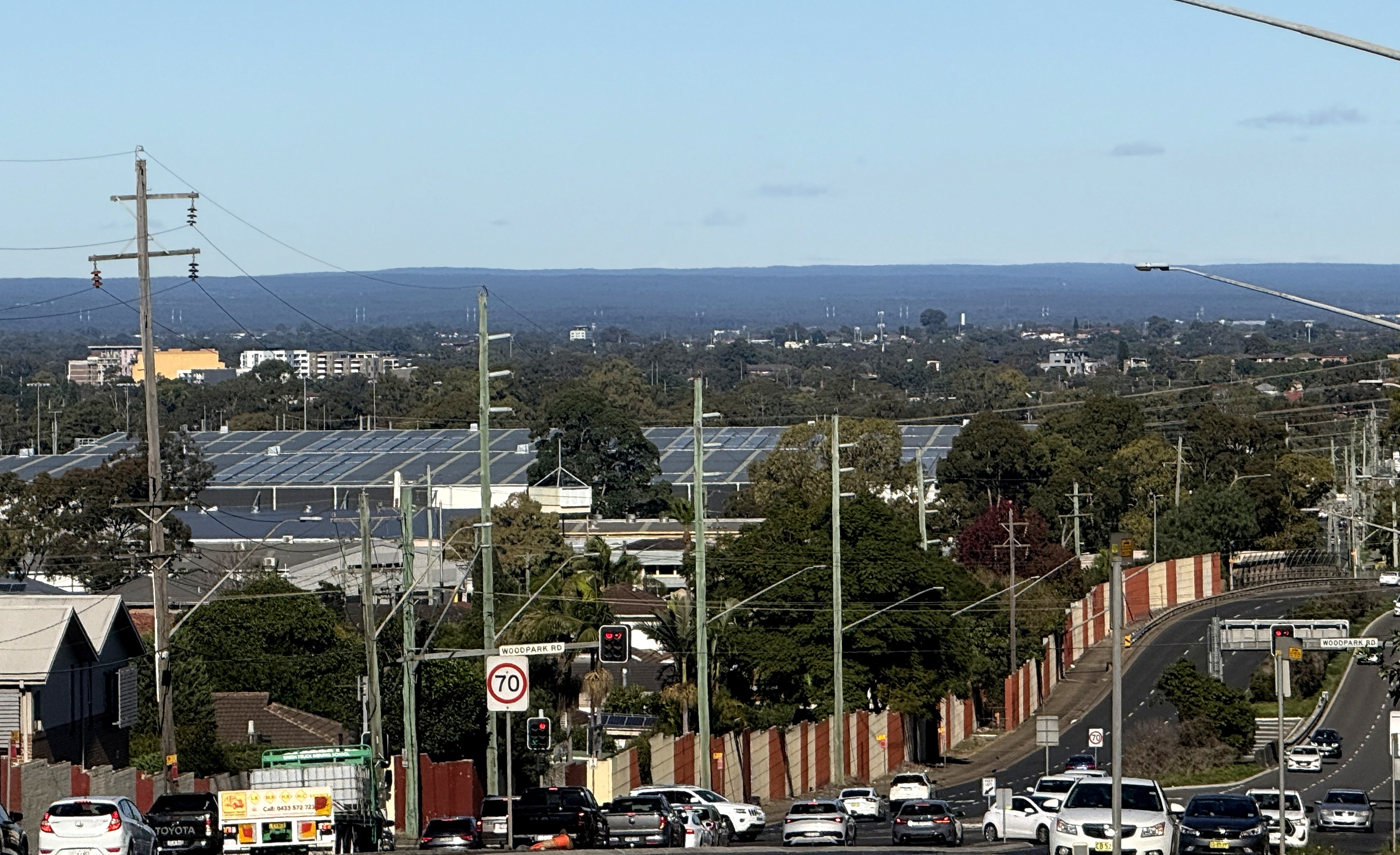
The topography of south-western Sydney (the Cumberland Plain), with its urban tree canopy.

Greater Sydney's boundaries stretch 80 kilometres (50 mi) from Palm Beach in the north to the Royal National Park in the south, and 80 kilometres (50 mi) from Bondi Beach in the east to the Blue Mountains in the west. The extensive area covered by urban Sydney is formally divided into more than 650 suburbs for addressing and postal purposes, and administered as 38 local government areas. The City of Sydney itself covers a fairly small area comprising the central business district and its neighbouring inner-city suburbs. The 151st meridian east passes through the western suburbs of Granville and Revesby, among others. The suburbs to the west of those lie on the eastern end of the 150th meridian, which is a line that passes through the Russian city of Magadan in the Northern Hemisphere.

The Sydney central business district (CBD) extends southwards for about 2 km (1.2 mi) from Sydney Cove, the point of the first European settlement. The west side is bounded by Darling Harbour, a popular tourist and nightlife precinct while Central station marks the southern end of the CBD. George Street serves as the Sydney CBD's main north–south thoroughfare. The oldest parts of the city are located in the flat areas south of the harbour; the North Shore was slower to develop because of its hilly topography, and was mostly a quiet backwater until the Sydney Harbour Bridge was opened in 1932, linking it to the rest of the city, with the suburbs surrounding the northern entrance to said bridge effectively developing North Sydney into a second central business district.

The Eastern Suburbs sit on the coast of Sydney. They contain iconic beaches such as Bondi Beach and Coogee Beach, and feature prominent seaside cliffs. The suburbs of Maroubra, Coogee and Bondi Junction lie on steep slopes, and would have an elevation of 90 metres (295 feet) at the highest peaks. These suburbs are located in generally close proximity to the city centre and are serviced by rail networks. The landscape in these areas is characterized by winding crescent-like streets with harbourside beaches and villages.

The Northern Suburbs of Sydney are characterised by pristine waterways with immense greenery and large plots of manicured land. Being around 80 to 180 metres (260 to 590 ft) above sea level, the region is very hilly and has a higher elevation than the rest of Sydney. Most of the North Shore suburbs are part of the Hawkesbury Plateau, a large sandstone plateau overlaid by a system of hilly ridges and gullies. Major waterways in the region include the Parramatta River, Lane Cove River and the many creek systems that branch out from these. The region is home to many parks and nature reserves – The Lane Cove National Park and the Garigal National Park include many areas of remnant bushland adjacent to the Lane Cove River and Middle Harbour.

The Hills District, situated halfway between the northern suburbs and greater western Sydney, is a region so named for its characteristically comparatively hilly topography, akin to the Northern Suburbs and North Shore. Several of its suburbs have the word 'Hills' in their names. As the name indicates, the Hills District, depending on the suburb, is around 80 to 180 metres (260 to 590 ft) above sea level. As such, its elevation creates orographic rainfall brought in by onshore winds from the Pacific Ocean.

The western suburbs predominantly lie on the Cumberland Plain and are relatively flat in contrast to the above regions. They are situated on a rain shadow, thanks to the Hills District to the northeast. Thus, they tend to be drier than the coast and less lush than the hilly Northern Suburbs. Despite being known as "flat", there are a number of ridgy areas on the plain – Western Sydney Regional Park and Prospect Hill are between 130 and 140 metres (430 and 460 ft) high. Highly elevated suburbs, which typically range between 70 and 100 metres (230 and 330 ft) in height, include Leppington and Oran Park to the southwest, Pemulwuy, Cecil Hills and Horsley Park to the greater west, and Greystanes, Seven Hills and Mount Druitt to the northwest. Agriculture is mainly concentrated in the outskirts of the Greater Western Sydney area, such as in suburbs of Kemps Creek, Orchard Hills, Luddenham and Horsley Park, among others, which lie in a countryside.

The Blue Mountains (sometimes considered part of Greater Sydney) rise to the west of the western suburbs up to a height of 1,189 metres (3,901 ft), the highest point in the Sydney region.

=== Recreational areas ===
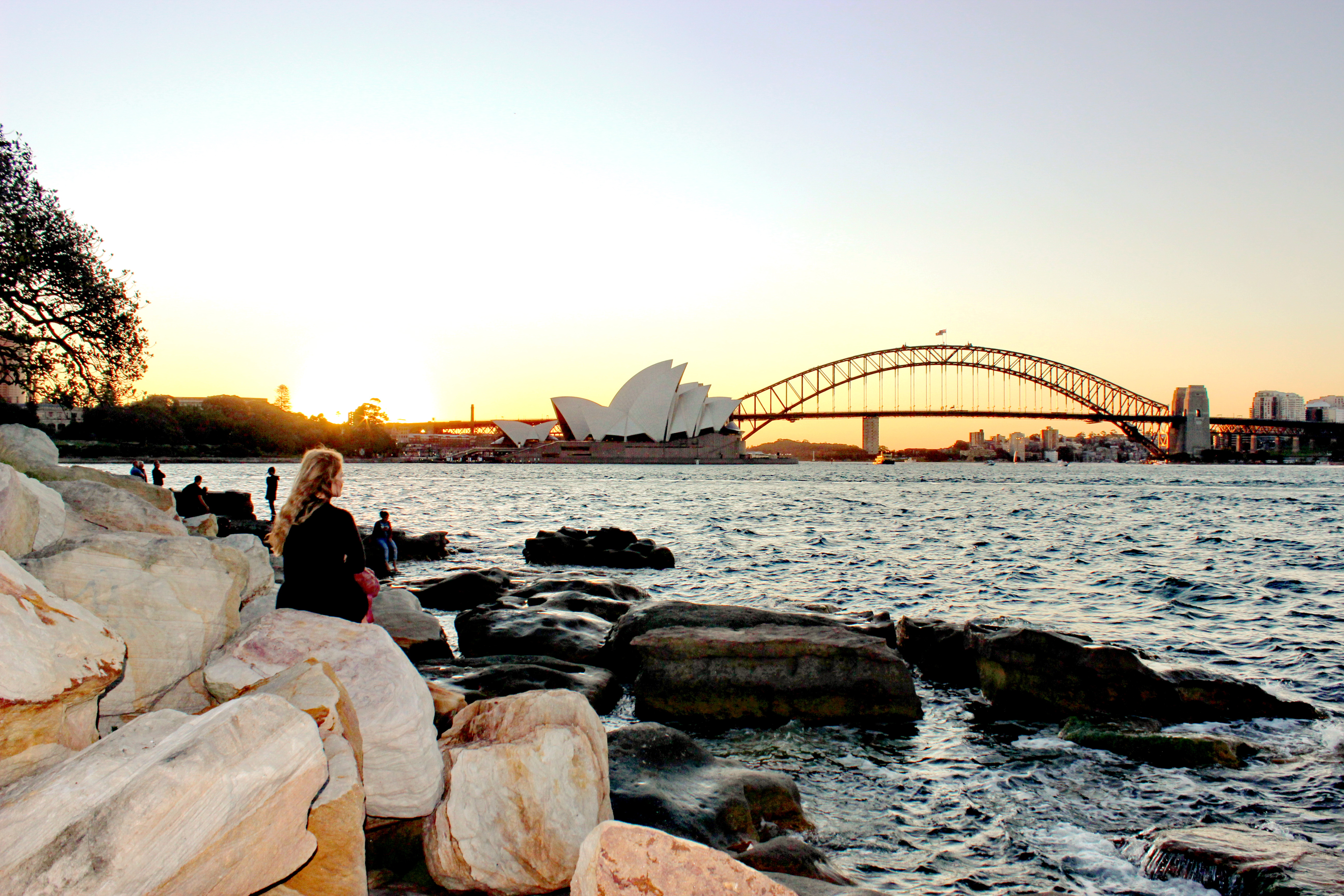
Mrs Macquarie's Point, in The Domain, shapes the northeastern tip of Farm Cove and provides panoramic views over the bay to the Opera House and the city skyline.

The Sydney CBD contains prominent parks such as, Hyde Park, The Domain and Royal Botanic Gardens and Farm Cove on the harbour. Other parks in that vicinity include Wynyard and Hyde Park. The Royal Botanic Gardens is the most important green space in the Sydney region, hosting both scientific and leisure activities. There are 15 separate parks under the administration of the City of Sydney. The Royal National Park was proclaimed on 26 April 1879 and with 13,200 hectares (51 square miles) is the second oldest national park in the world.

The largest park in the Sydney metropolitan region is Ku-ring-gai Chase National Park, established in 1894 with an area of 15,400 hectares (59 square miles). It is regarded for its well-preserved records of indigenous habitation and more than 800 rock engravings, cave drawings, and middens have been located in the park. The Domain is the oldest public parkland in Australia and measures 16.2 hectares (0.1 square miles) in area. Its location was used for both relaxation and the grazing of animals from the earliest days of the colony.

The inner west suburbs include Centennial Park and Moore Park in the east, Sydney Park and Royal National Park in the south, Ku-ring-gai Chase National Park in the north, and Western Sydney Parklands in the west. Other major parks in the Sydney metropolitan area include Auburn Botanical Gardens, Central Gardens Nature Reserve, Heathcote National Park, Georges River National Park, Lane Cove National Park and Blue Mountains National Park. There are large parks and reserves surrounding prominent bodies of water, such as those around Prospect Reservoir, Chipping Norton Lake, Lake Parramatta and Nepean River (Bents Basin).

Sydney has some of the finest and most famous beaches in the world. There are well over 100 beaches in the city, ranging in size from a few metres to several kilometres, located along the city's Pacific Ocean coastline and its harbours, bays and rivers. With around 70 surf beaches and dozens of harbour coves, Sydney is almost unrivalled in the world for the number and quality of beaches available. The water and sand among the city beaches, despite their popularity, are remarkably clean. The beach watch program was established in 1989 in response to community concern about the impact of sewage pollution on human health and the environment at Sydney's ocean beaches.

=== Regions ===
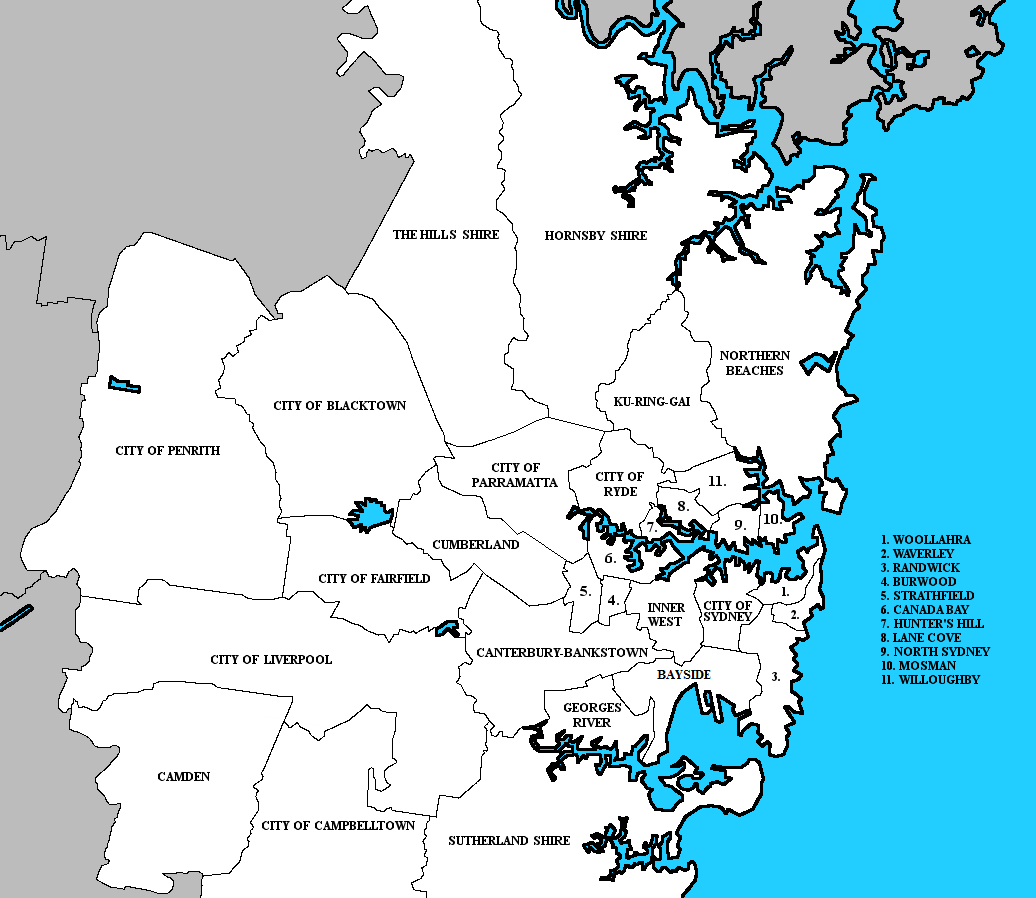
Local government areas in Sydney

There are a number of informal regional names describing large sections of the urban area. Not all suburbs are necessarily covered by any of the following informal regional categories.

The regions are Canterbury-Bankstown, the Eastern Suburbs, the Forest District, Greater Western Sydney, the Hills District, the Inner West, the Macarthur region, the Northern Beaches, the Northern Suburbs, the North Shore, Southern Sydney, South Western Sydney, the St George district, the Sutherland Shire and Western Sydney. The Blue Mountains are at times considered to be part of Sydney's metropolitan area.

The largest commercial centres outside of the CBD are North Sydney and Chatswood in the north, Parramatta to the west, Liverpool in the south-west, Hurstville in the south and Bondi Junction to the east. There has been accelerating commercial development in Parramatta since the 1950s as firms serving Western Sydney have set up regional offices and recognised the region's significant residential population mass and cheaper rents.

== Climate ==
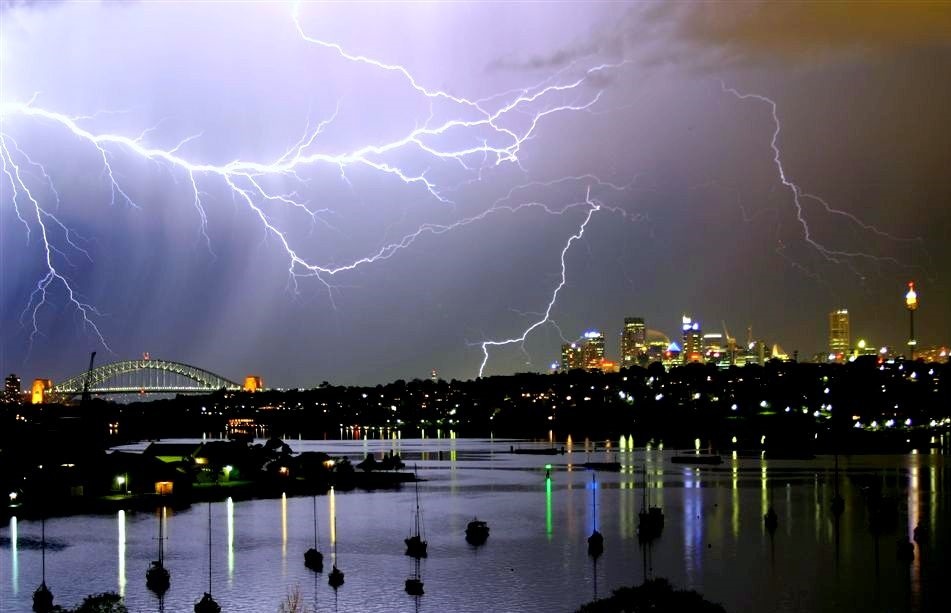
Thunderstorms and lightning occasionally occur in the spring and summer months.

Sydney has a humid subtropical climate (Cfa) with warm and sometimes hot summers, and winters shifting from mild to cool. Although Sydney is predominantly humid subtropical, the hilly areas of the Forest District, such as Terrey Hills, among others, have a borderline oceanic climate (Cfb). The weather is moderated by proximity to the ocean, and more extreme temperatures are recorded in the inland western suburbs.

The warmest month in the CBD is January, with an average air temperature range at Observatory Hill of 19.6–26.5 °C (67.3–79.7 °F). The coldest month is July, with an average range of 8.7–17.4 °C (47.7–63.3 °F). In the west, the temperatures average between 17.5 and 28.4 °C (63.5 and 83.1 °F) in summer. In winter, they're normally between 6.2 and 17.4 °C (43.2 and 63.3 °F). In late spring and summer, Sydney can sometimes get northwesterly winds from the Outback, which are dry and hot, making the temperatures reach above 40 °C (104.0 °F). Frost is oftentimes observed in the outer suburbs.

Rainfall is spread throughout the year, but is slightly higher during the first half of the year when easterly winds dominate. Sydney's coast generally receives around 1,000 mm (39.37 in) to 1,200 mm (47.24 in) of rain annually. The western suburbs receive around 800 mm (31.50 in) to 900 mm (35.43 in) of precipitation, since moist onshore winds do not penetrate inland. Australian east coast low brings large amounts of rain in late autumn and winter.

== See also ==
- Sydney basin
- Geology of New South Wales
- Geology of Australia
- Cumberland Plain Woodland
- Sydney sandstone
- Bald Hill Claystone
- Geography of Australia
- Geography of New South Wales
- List of beaches in Sydney

== Sources ==
- Australian Heritage Commission (1981). The Heritage of Australia : the illustrated register of the National Estate. South Melbourne The Macmillan Company of Australia in association with the Australian Heritage Commission. ISBN 978-0-333-33750-9.
- Branagan, David F.; Packham, Gordon H. (2000). Field geology of New South Wales. Sydney: New South Wales Department of Mineral Resources. ISBN 0-7313-9222-1.
- Fairley, A; Moore, P (2000). Native Plants of the Sydney District: An Identification Guide (2nd ed.). East Roseville: Kangaroo Press. ISBN 0-7318-1031-7.
- Flannery, Tim, ed. (1999). The Birth of Sydney. Melbourne: Text Publishing. ISBN 1-876485-45-0.
- Forster, Clive A (1995). Australian cities : continuity and change. Oxford University Press. ISBN 978-0-19-553565-5.
- Herbert, Chris; Helby, Robin, eds. (1980). A Guide to the Sydney Basin. D. West, Govt. Printer. ISBN 978-0-7240-1250-3.
- Karskens, Grace (2010). The Colony, A History of Early Sydney. Sydney: Allen & Unwin. ISBN 978-1-74237-364-5.
- Packham, Gordon H, ed. (1969). The geology of New South Wales. Geological Society of Australia.
