= Handbook of Australian Soils =

The Handbook of Australian Soils is a soil classification system developed for Australian soils. The first edition was published in 1968 and is based on the great soil group classification system published by J. A. Prescott in 1931. It has since been superseded by the Australian Soil Classification.
