= Kurosol =

Soil order in the Australian Soil Classification

Kurosols are soils belonging to one of the fifteen soil orders of the Australian Soil Classification. Kurosols are characterised by a strong texture contrast between their surface (A) horizons and clay-rich subsoil (B) horizons, with the upper part of the B horizon being strongly acidic. They are widespread in parts of eastern and southern Australia, particularly in higher-rainfall and extensively weathered landscapes.

== Classification ==
Under the Australian Soil Classification, a Kurosol is a soil, other than a hydrosol, possessing a clear or abrupt textural B horizon in which the major part of the upper 0.2 m (20 cm; 7.9 in) of the B2t horizon is strongly acidic. If the entire B2t horizon is less than 0.2 m (20 cm; 7.9 in) thick, the criterion applies to the majority of that horizon.

The defining characteristic distinguishing kurosols from the other major texture-contrast soil orders is the chemistry of the upper B horizon. In kurosols it is strongly acidic, whereas the corresponding horizon in chromosols is neither strongly acidic nor sodic, and that of sodosols is sodic.

The strongly acidic subsoil generally has a pH below 5.5 when measured in water. Some kurosols also possess unusual subsoil chemical characteristics, including relatively high concentrations of magnesium, sodium or aluminium.

== Characteristics ==
Kurosols typically have a relatively coarse-textured surface horizon, commonly consisting of loam, sandy loam or similar material, overlying a substantially more clay-rich subsoil. The transition between the two horizons is usually distinct, producing the strong texture contrast characteristic of the order.

A typical profile may consist of a loamy or sandy surface layer followed by a paler subsurface horizon and an abrupt transition to clay. Depending on local geology and drainage, the subsoil may be red, brown, yellow, grey or black and may exhibit mottling.

The clay-rich B horizon can restrict the penetration of plant roots and the movement of water through the soil profile. Strong acidity may also result in elevated levels of exchangeable aluminium, which can inhibit the growth of susceptible plants.

== Suborders ==
Kurosols are divided into five suborders according to the dominant colour of the upper 20 cm (7.9 in) of the B2 horizon:

- Red Kurosols
- Brown Kurosols
- Yellow Kurosols
- Grey Kurosols
- Black Kurosols

These colour classes form part of the hierarchical structure of the Australian Soil Classification. Kurosols can be further divided into great groups and subgroups according to additional chemical and morphological properties.

== Distribution ==
Kurosols occur in several parts of Australia and are particularly associated with landscapes experiencing relatively high rainfall and leaching. They commonly occur on weathered landscapes, including lower and middle slopes, valleys, terraces and upland areas.

They are an important component of the soils of south-eastern Australia. Within the Sydney Basin bioregion, Kurosols account for approximately 22% of mapped soils, making them the second-most extensive soil order in the bioregion after Tenosols. they are particularly prevalent within the Cumberland Lowland and Monaro Fall physiographic provinces.

In the Sydney Basin, Kurosols commonly occur on middle and lower slopes and typically display a sharp transition from comparatively coarse-textured sandy or loamy surface horizons to clay-rich subsoils.

In Victoria, Kurosols are particularly associated with higher-rainfall regions. Red Kurosols occur extensively on lower valley slopes, alluvial fans, elevated terraces and residual hills in north-eastern Victoria, while Brown and Yellow Kurosols occur in parts of Gippsland, the Otway Ranges and other higher-rainfall landscapes.

In Queensland, Kurosols occur principally in coastal and sub-coastal areas of the southern part of the state.

== Agriculture and management ==
The agricultural characteristics of Kurosols vary according to their parent material, landscape position and degree of weathering. Their strong texture contrast can restrict root penetration and water movement into the clay-rich subsoil, while strongly acidic conditions can reduce the availability of some plant nutrients.

Aluminium and manganese toxicity may occur in strongly acidic horizons, particularly under waterlogged conditions, while molybdenum deficiency may also affect plant growth. Agricultural management can include maintaining or increasing surface organic matter, reducing excessive tillage and, where appropriate, applying agricultural lime to increase the pH of acidic surface soils. Acidity deeper within the subsoil is more difficult to ameliorate because surface-applied lime moves through the soil relatively slowly.

Despite these limitations, Kurosols are used for several forms of agriculture. In Victoria they support grazing and, in suitable higher-rainfall areas, viticulture and other forms of cropping.

== See also ==
- Australian Soil Classification
- Soil classification
- Podosol
- Pedology
- Ultisol
