= Waterlogging =

Waterlogging or water logging may refer to:

- Waterlogging (agriculture), saturation of the soil by groundwater sufficient to prevent or hinder agriculture
- Waterlogging (archeology), the exclusion of air from an archeological site by groundwater, preserving artifacts
- Underwater logging, the process of harvesting trees that are submerged under water
- Watered stock, an asset with artificially high value

Waterlog may refer to:

- Waterlog: A Swimmer's Journey Through Britain, a 1999 book by Roger Deakin
