= Australian Soil Classification =

Australia's soil classification system

The Australian Soil Classification is the classification system currently used to describe and classify soils in Australia. It is a general-purpose, hierarchical classification system, and consists of five categorical levels from the most general to the most specific: Order, Suborder, Great Group, Subgroup, and Family. An online key is available. The Australian Soil Classification supersedes other classification systems previously developed for Australian soils, including the Factual Key (1960) and the Handbook of Australian Soils (1968).

The Australian Soil Classification was developed by Ray Isbell, a retired soil scientist with CSIRO, and first published in 1996. A revised first edition was published in 2002, a second edition in 2010 and a third edition in March 2021. Since Ray Isbell's death in 2001 the National Committee on Soil and Terrain has led the updates and improvements to the classification and this committee is now listed as a co-author with Ray Isbell.

== Structure of the classification system ==
=== Order level ===
At the top, most general, level of the Australian Soil Classification, there are fifteen Soil Orders. They are: Anthroposols, Arenosols, Calcarosols, Chromosols, Dermosols, Ferrosols, Hydrosols, Kandosols, Kurosols, Organosols, Podosols, Rudosols, Sodosols, Tenosols and Vertosols. The character of many of the Soil Orders reflects the arid, strongly-weathered nature of the Australian continent.

=== Suborder level ===
For the Vertosol, Kurosol, Sodosol, Chromosol, Ferrosol, Dermosol and Kandosol orders, the suborder-level categories reflect the dominant colour of the upper part of the B2 horizon. There are five suborder colour categories, namely Red, Brown, Yellow, Grey and Black. The colour classes have the same names as, but are not directly equivalent to, those used in the Factual Key and estimated using a subset of the Munsell Colour System. The full suborder designation then becomes Red Kurosol, Grey Vertosol, for example.

The remaining soil orders have suborder categories that reflect unique characteristics of the given order. For example, the Hydrosol order is split into Intertidal Hydrosols, Supratidal Hydrosols, Extratidal Hydrosols, Hypersalic Hydrosols, Salic Hydrosols, Redoxic Hydrosols and Oxyaquic Hydrosols. On the other hand, the Rudosols are split into Hypergypsic Rudosols, Hypersalic Rudosols, Shelly Rudosols, Carbic Rudosols, Arenic Rudosols, Lutic Rudosols, Stratic Rudosols, Clastic Rudosols and Leptic Rudosols at the suborder level.

== See also ==
- Soil classification
