= Woronora Plateau =

- Coordinates: 34°02′02″S 151°01′34″E
- Country: Australia
- State: New South Wales

The Woronora Plateau is a plateau located in New South Wales, Australia. The area is adjacent to the Sydney Plains and is slightly higher in altitude. It is capped with Hawkesbury Sandstone. It is often hotter in summer and colder in winter than in metropolitan Sydney. The Woronora River flows through the deeply dissected plateau to the Georges River from near the sources of the Port Hacking, within the Sutherland Shire.

Located between the Woronora River and Forbes Creek it holds the suburb of Woronora Heights. The plateau is part of the southern Sydney Basin and is dominated by Triassic Hawkesbury Sandstone.

== See also ==
- Geography of Sydney
- Hornsby Plateau
