= Hornsby Plateau =

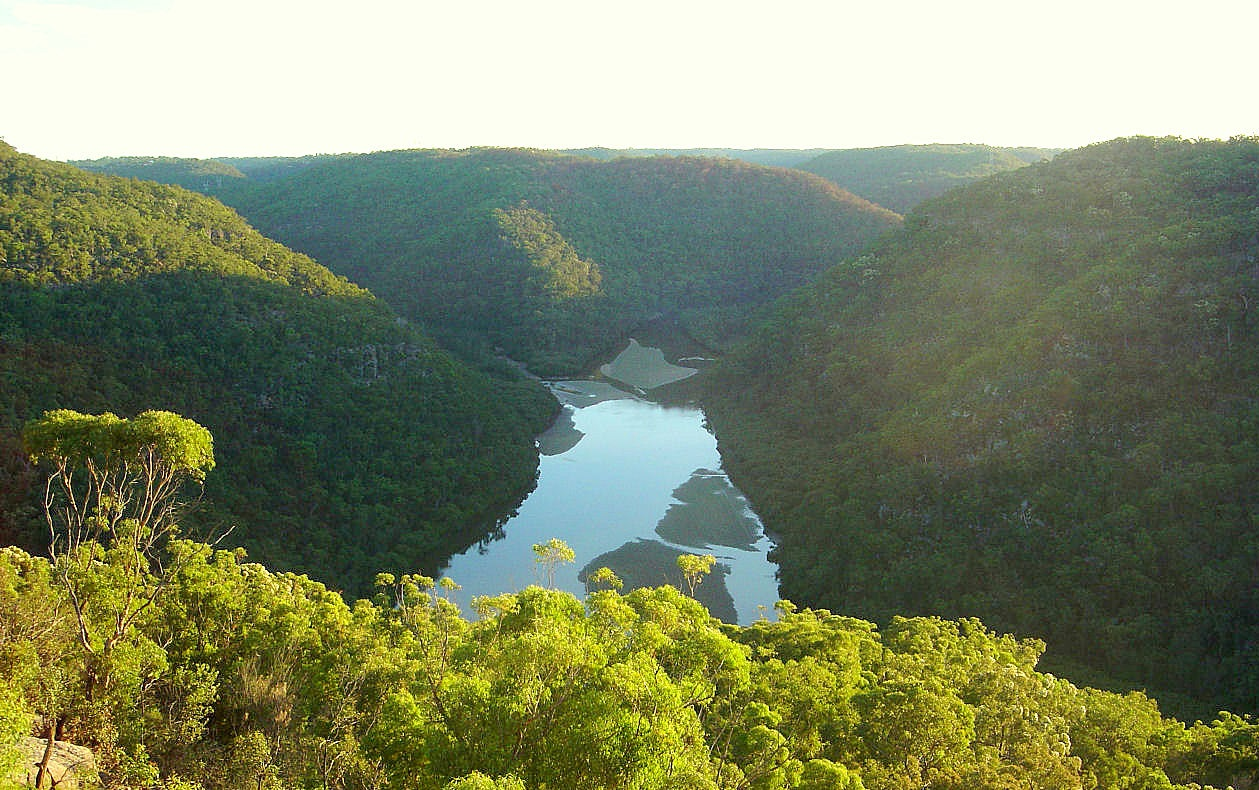
- The river valleys of the plateau

- Coordinates: 33°46′22″S 151°11′14″E
- Country: Australia
- State: New South Wales

The Hornsby Plateau is a dissected sandstone plateau lying to the north of Sydney Harbour that rises 200 metres (660 ft). The plateau is a part of the larger Sydney Basin structure.

== Geography ==
The North Shore and the Berowra Valley National Park are located on the Hornsby Plateau. It is separated from the Blue Mountains Plateau by the passage of the Colo River. The plateau rises from the Cumberland Plain in the south along a warp line increasing from the proximity of Cattai to Botany Bay. The plateau's elevation ranges between 200–220 metres (660–720 ft), with gullies that fall 80–100 metres (260–330 ft) deep along drainage lines. Steep slopes with drastic ascension of over 100 metres (330 ft) are present. The soil type is generally lithosols, which has low fertility and is normally less than 500 millimetres (20 in) deep.

== Geology ==
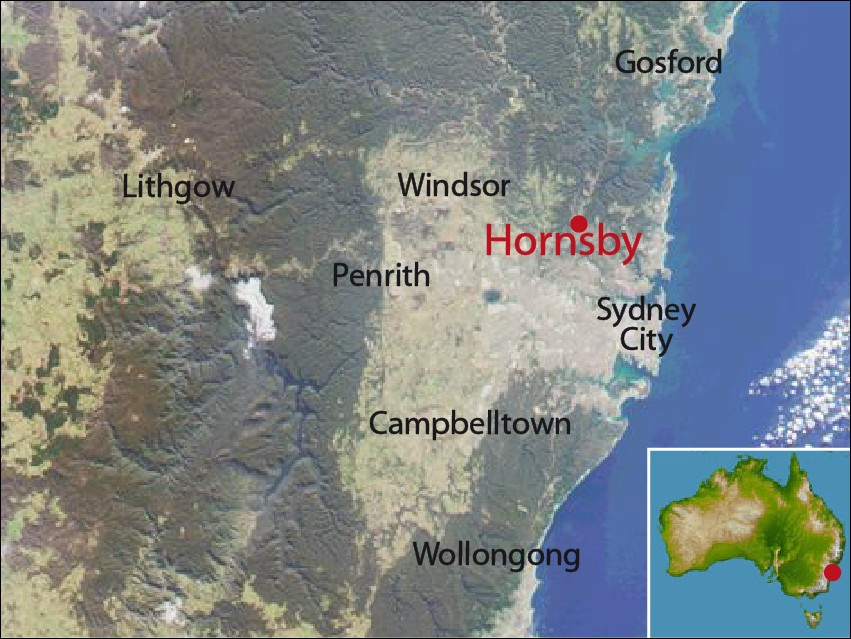
Hornsby is situated on the plateau, hence the namesake.

Rock deposits in the Sydney area were tertiary freshwater sediments, which were a rough gravelly layer up to eight metres (twenty-six feet) thick located beneath silt and sand at a mean depth of six metres (twenty feet). As time went by, weathering transformed much of the sandy silt into siliceous clay. At the end of the Tertiary period, or about 80 million years ago, earth movements created an upheaval of six hundred metres (two thousand feet) in most of coastal eastern Australia, due to the rifting and opening of the Tasman Sea. Thus, these movements created the Blue Mountains and Hornsby Plateaux, with the lagging behind of the peneplain becoming the Cumberland Plain.

The plateau was scoured by freshwater streams, which perforated a labyrinth of V-shaped valleys with intruding rocky ridges into the Hawkesbury Sandstone. The drainage activity is ascertained by the Hawkesbury Sandstone's impotence, which were employed by early watercourses. As the creeks carved deeper into the plateau, they began undercutting the sandstone walls of the valley, and as such, blocks of sandstone fell down, thus creating cliff lines.

Due to its hilly topography, the plateau was slow to develop. It has two main sedimentary rock layers: Hawkesbury sandstone, consisting mostly of sandstone, but with some shale, and the overlying Ashfield Shale, which supports richer vegetation. There are also a few volcanic intrusions throughout the plateau.

== See also ==
- Woronora Plateau
