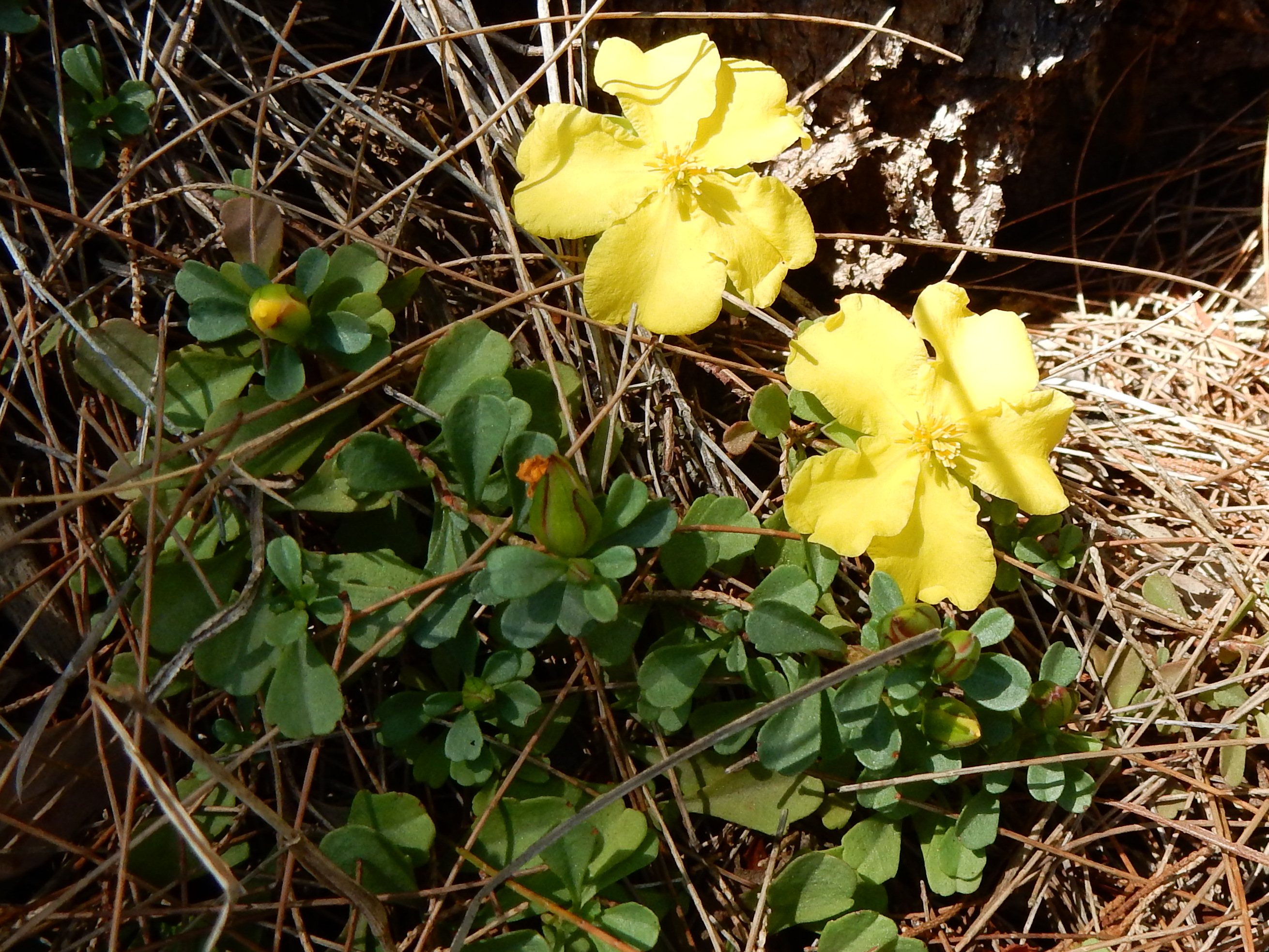
- Ku-ring-gai Chase National Park, Australia

Scientific classification
- Kingdom: Plantae
- Clade: Tracheophytes
- Clade: Angiosperms
- Clade: Eudicots
- Order: Dilleniales
- Family: Dilleniaceae
- Genus: Hibbertia
- Species: H. diffusa

Binomial name
- Hibbertia diffusa R.Br. ex DC.

= Hibbertia diffusa =

Wedge guinea flower

Species of flowering plant

Hibbertia diffusa, commonly known as wedge guinea flower, is a species of flowering plant in the family Dilleniaceae and is endemic to south-eastern Australia. It is a prostrate to low-lying shrub with glabrous stems, egg-shaped to lance-shaped leaves with the narrower end towards the base, and bright yellow flowers arranged on the ends of branchlets, with twenty to twenty-five stamens arranged around two or three carpels.

== Description ==
Hibbertia diffusa is a prostrate to low-lying shrub that typically grows to a height of up to 30 cm (12 in) and usually has glabrous stems. The leaves are egg-shaped to lance-shaped with the narrower end towards the base, 4–30 mm (0.16–1.18 in) long and 3–9 mm (0.12–0.35 in) wide on a short petiole. The flowers are sessile and mostly arranged on the ends of branchlets, the five sepals 6–8 mm (0.24–0.31 in) long and the five bright yellow petals 7–10 mm (0.28–0.39 in) long. There are twenty to twenty-five stamens arranged in groups around the two or three glabrous carpels. Flowering occurs from September to November.

== Taxonomy ==
Hibbertia diffusa was first formally described in 1817 by Augustin Pyramus de Candolle in his Regni Vegetabilis Systema Naturale from an unpublished description by Robert Brown.

== Distribution and habitat ==
Wedge guinea flower grows in open forest on the coast and ranges of south-eastern Queensland, New South Wales and far north-eastern Victoria.
