= Cumberland Plain Woodland =

Indigenous woodland community in Sydney, Australia

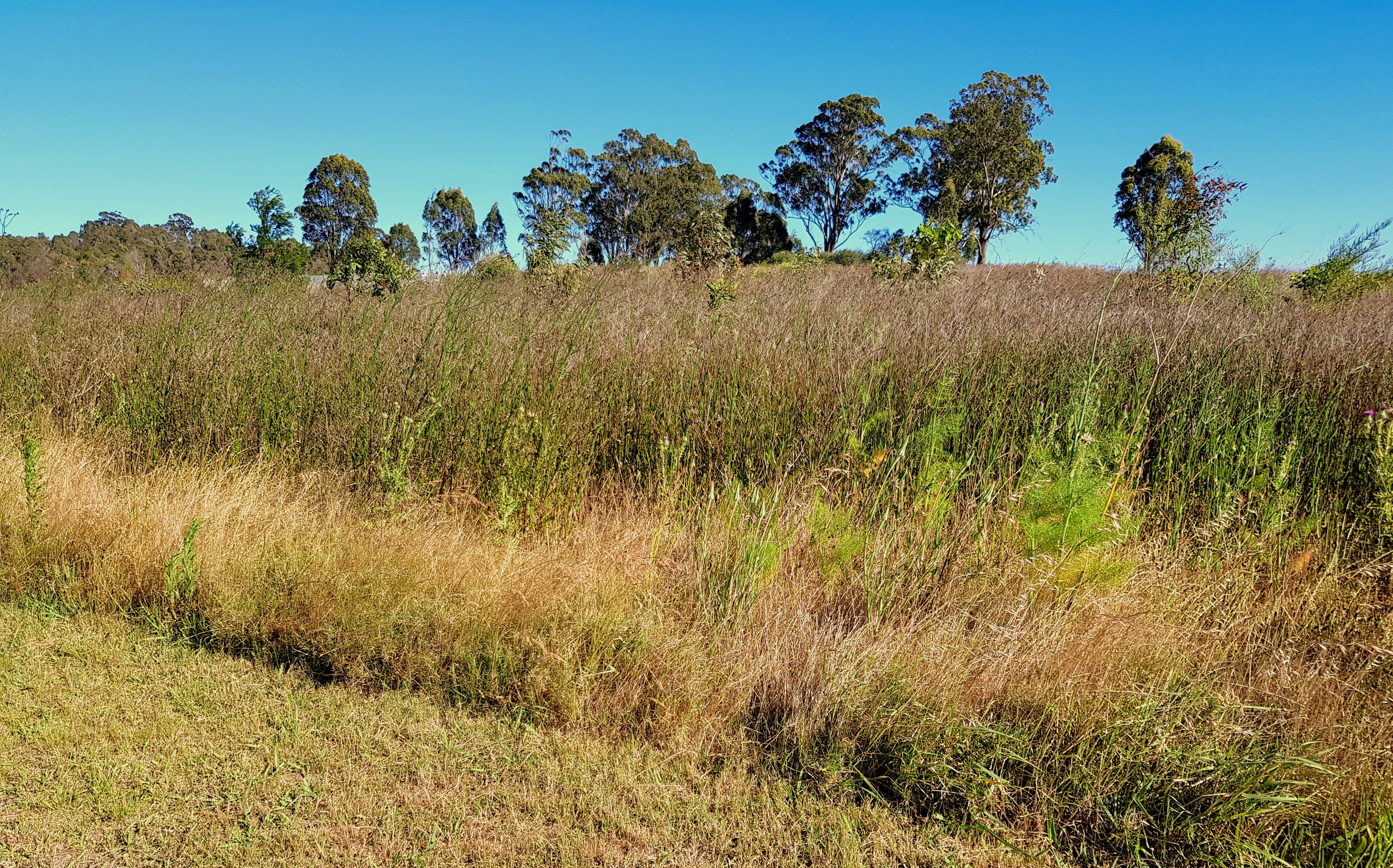
- Grassy plain with scattered eucalypts

Ecology
- Realm: Australasia
- Biome: Tropical and subtropical grasslands, savannas, and shrublands
- Borders: Blue Mountains and Southern Highlands Basalt Forests; Cooks River/Castlereagh Ironbark Forest; Southern Highlands Shale Forest and Woodland; Shale Sandstone Transition Forest

Geography
- Country: Australia
- Elevation: 10–100 metres (33–328 ft)
- Coordinates: 33°50′59″S 150°54′40″E
- Geology: Sandstone, shale, laminite and siltstone
- Climate type: Humid subtropical climate (Cfa)
- Soil types: Clay, sand (podsol, entisols, kurosols, lithosols), loam

The Cumberland Plain Woodland, also known as Cumberland Plain Bushland and Western Sydney woodland, is a grassy woodland community found predominantly in Western Sydney, New South Wales, Australia, that comprises an open tree canopy, a groundcover with grasses and herbs, usually with layers of shrubs and/or small trees.

Situated in the Cumberland Plain, the Cumberland Plain Woodland (CPW) is a critically endangered savanna that features dry sclerophyll woodlands, grasslands and/or forests, reminiscent of Mediterranean forests. According to Office of Environment and Heritage, the community falls predominantly within the Coastal Valley Grassy Woodlands region, which are part of the Grassy Woodlands formation found in the eastern corridor of New South Wales.

Currently, less than 6% of the Woodlands remain in small parts distributed across the western suburbs of Sydney, totaling only around 6400 hectares. Cumberland Plain Woodland was listed as an Endangered Ecological Community under the Threatened Species Conservation Act 1995 in June 1997. The greatest threats to the Cumberland Plain Woodland include land clearing for agriculture, urban sprawl and the introduction of harmful weed species.

== Geography ==
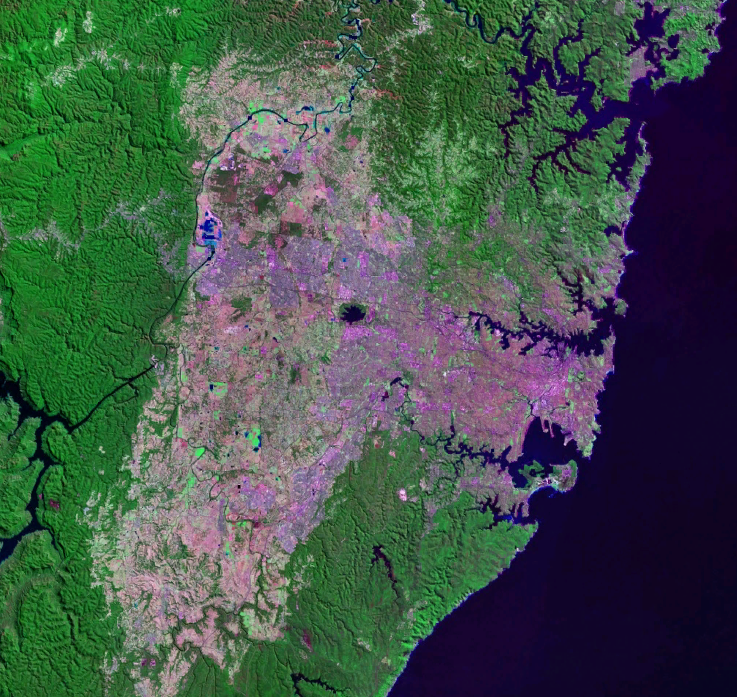
The Cumberland Plain Woodland region lies far-west of Sydney CBD.

In 1877, Cumberland Plain Woodlands covered 107,000 hectares and filled around 30% of the Sydney Basin. At the time of European land exploration of Australia, the Cumberland Plain contained 1,070 km² of woodlands and forests. The westward expansion of Sydney over the plain has placed enormous pressure on the woodlands and other local ecological communities, only 6% of which remain uncleared. Tozer (2003) estimated that only 11,054 ha of the ecosystem’s pre-European extent remained, representing an average historical clearing rate of 1.2–1.33% per year and a total loss of 92–94% of Cumberland Plain Woodland. Areas with low tree cover but without rural residential or urban development could potentially add a further 9,588 ha, reducing the estimated historical decline to 83.5%. Another 6,271 ha occurs in low-tree-cover areas that have been developed for rural residential or urban use, which would lower the decline to approximately 78.5%.

Cumberland Plain Woodland occurs in Sydney's western suburbs, occupying the most fertile and gently undulating part of the Sydney Basin. As a result, it has experienced extensive clearing and alteration and is now considered one of the most depleted grassy woodland ecosystems in New South Wales. Some parts of the community may have a forest structure. The Woodland features an open tree canopy, groundcover prevailed by grasses and herbs, sometimes with layers of shrubs and small trees. The plain is made up of eucalypt woodland with a grassy undergrowth and sclerophyllous (hard-leaved) shrub stratum, demarcating with the heath and forest communities of the sandstone plateaus that surround the plain. The biotic community is mostly found on flat or hilly terrains up to about 350 m in elevation, but it may also be present on locally precipitous sites and at slightly higher elevations. The soils of the plain are infertile by world standards, but are not so by Australian standards. The ecoregion contains clay soils derived from Wianamatta Shale to the west of Sydney CBD, where it receives 750–900 mm of annual rainfall.

=== Locations ===
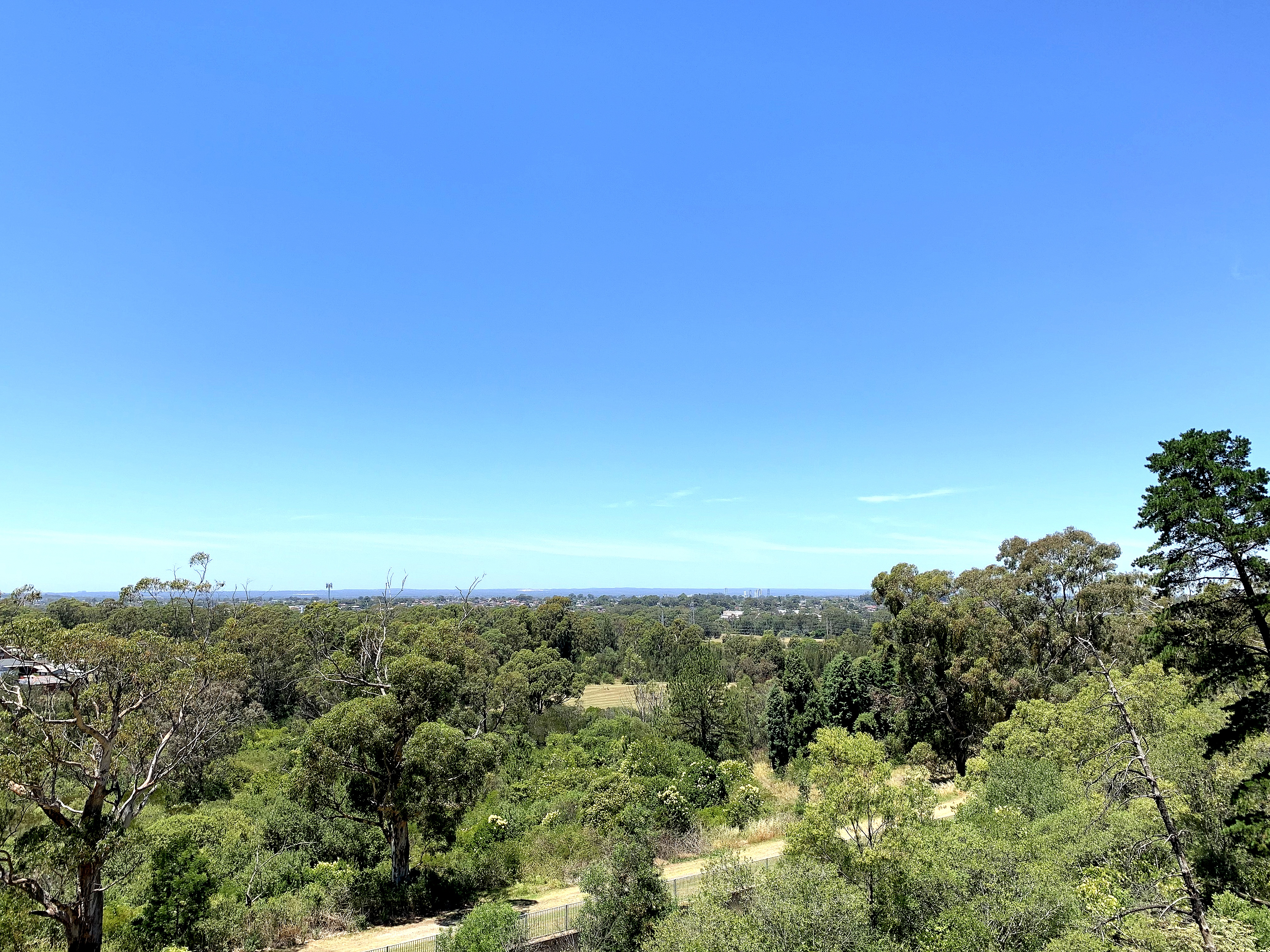
Swathes of the remaining woodland within the suburban Cumberland Plain

Spanning through the cities of Fairfield, Liverpool, Blacktown, Cumberland, Campbelltown, Camden and Penrith, with the cities of Canterbury-Bankstown, Hawkesbury, Parramatta and Wollondilly being on the peripheries, they contain approximately 2000 ha (one-fifth) of the remaining Cumberland Plain Woodland. Its range does not extend to slightly wetter Sydney Turpentine-Ironbark Forest, or high-rainfall ridges (such as Blue Gum High Forest in the upper North Shore), which are geologically on the Hornsby Plateau.

Examples of the remnants can be seen at Defence Establishment Orchard Hills, Scheyville National Park, Rosford Street Reserve, Brenan Park, Central Gardens Nature Reserve, Fairfield Park Precinct, Prospect Hill, Prospect Nature Reserve, Western Sydney Regional Park, Wetherill Park Nature Reserve and Chipping Norton Lake, among other places. Western Sydney Airport, currently under construction at Badgerys Creek, New South Wales, required the clearing of a large area of Cumberland Plain Woodland. Environmental offsets have been announced to ensure the protection, restoration and preservation of the woodland. The Biodiversity Offset Delivery Plan was announced on 24 August 2018 and included:

- Restoration and management of over 900 hectares of Cumberland Plain Woodland at Defence Establishment Orchard Hills
- Purchase of BioBanking credits through the NSW Biodiversity Offsets Scheme
- Other compensatory measures.

== Ecological communities ==
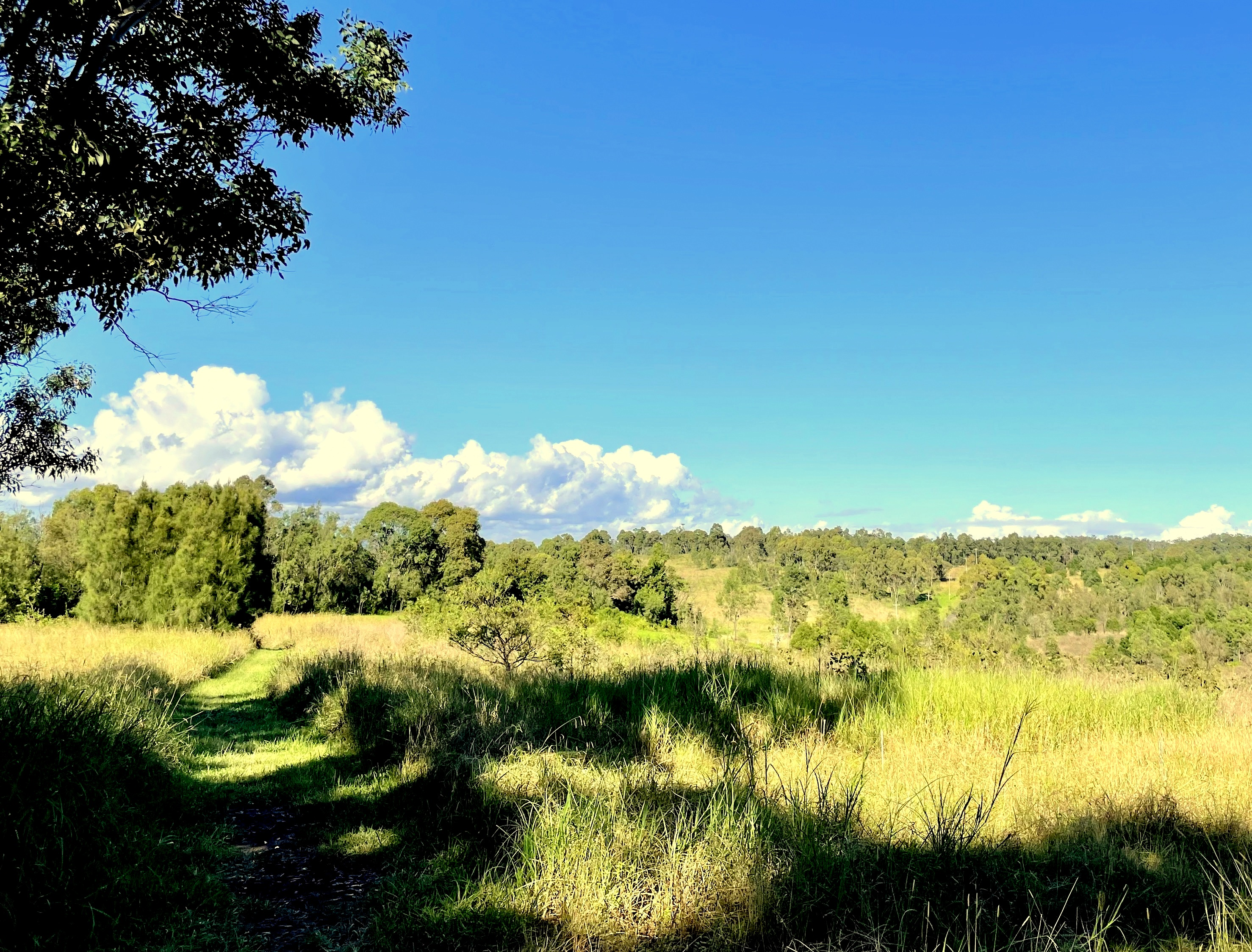
Moist Shale Woodlands

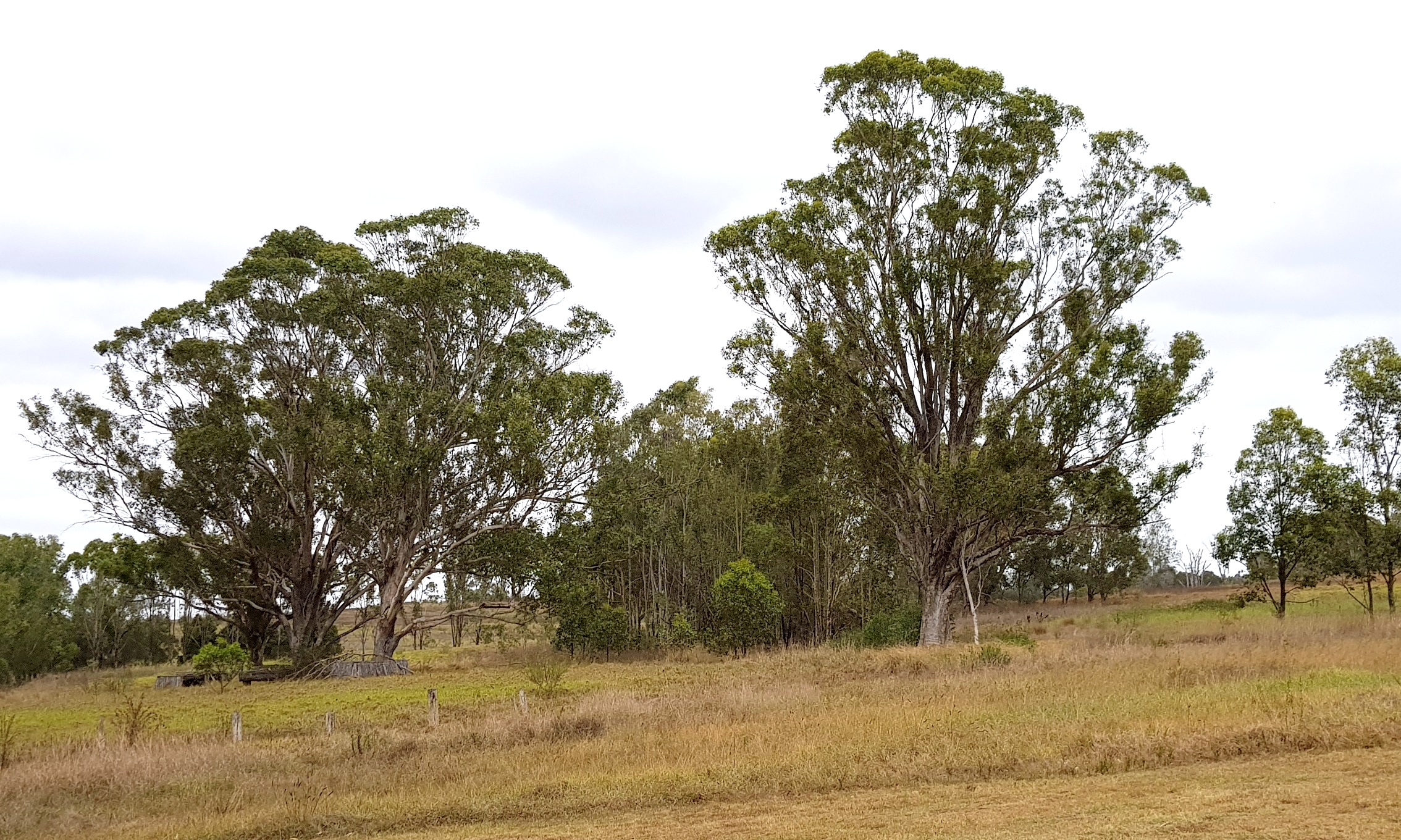
Shale Hills Woodlands

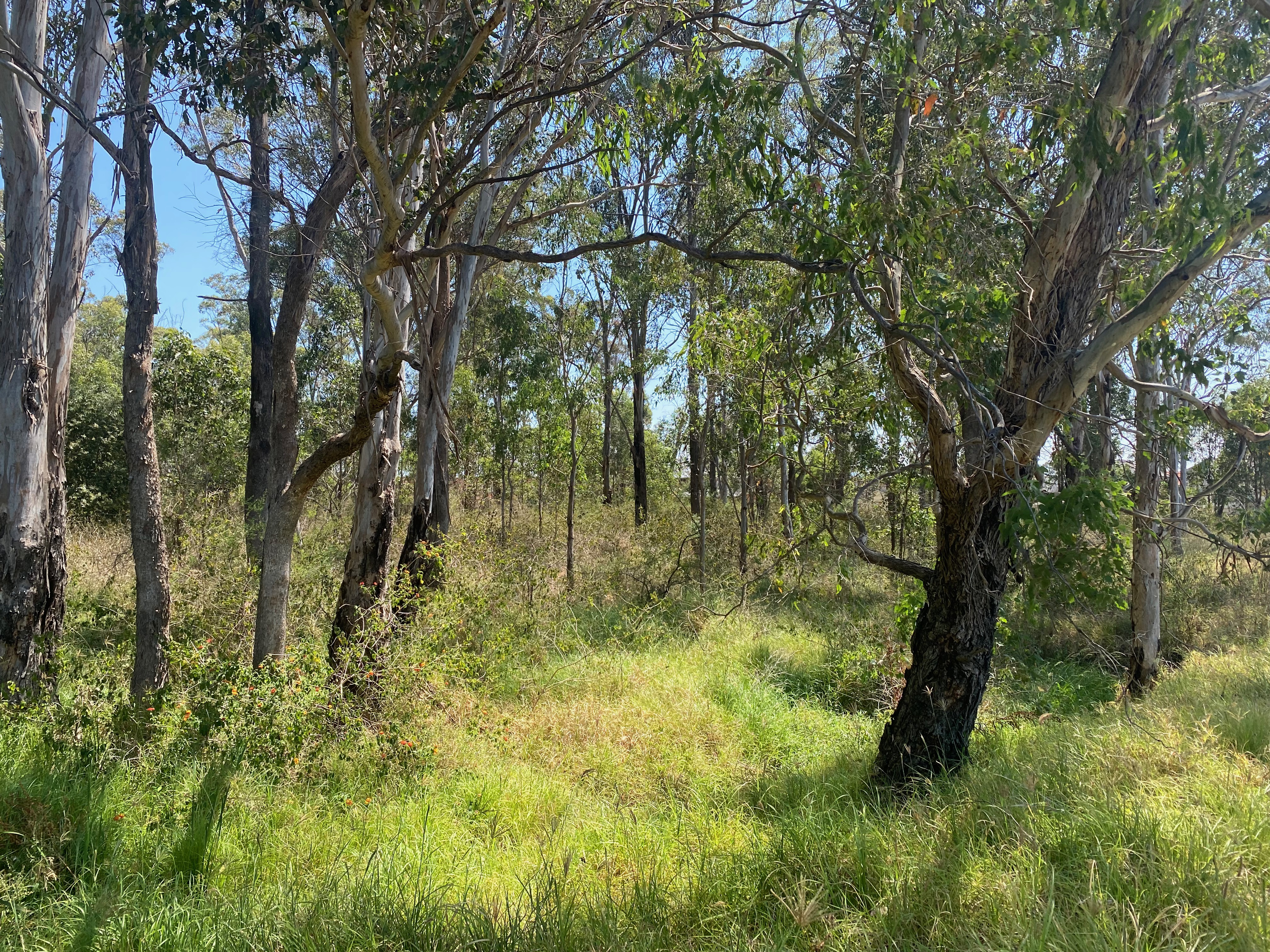
Shale Plains Woodlands

The International Union for Conservation of Nature lists the Cumberland Plain Woodland within the temperate woodlands group of the savannas and grasslands biome. In vegetation structure, Cumberland Plain Woodland resembles some forms of savanna and open woodland, being characterised by a relatively open tree canopy above a predominantly grassy and herbaceous ground layer. In vegetation structure, Cumberland Plain Woodland is characterised by an open tree canopy above a predominantly grassy and herbaceous ground layer. Trees are generally well spaced, with woodland on the Cumberland Plain characterised by a projected foliage cover of less than 30 per cent.

Comparable open-canopy vegetation structures occur in other parts of the world. The dehesas of the Iberian Peninsula are open woodlands characterised by scattered oak trees and a predominantly herbaceous or grassy ground layer. In the eastern Mediterranean, Tabor oak communities in Israel and Jordan can similarly form open park-forest, with widely dispersed trees accompanied by abundant herbaceous vegetation. Comparable vegetation structures also occur in African savanna and woodland regions. In South Sudan, for example, vegetation mapping distinguishes savanna with 10–30% tree-canopy cover from woodland with 30–50% canopy cover, both of which are widespread in the country.

The Cumberland Plain Woodland, classed under Coastal Valley Grassy Woodlands, includes these ecological communities, with some overlapping and others plainly being sub-regions of the Woodland:

- Cumberland Shale Hills Woodland – It is one of the widespread grassy woodland communities within Cumberland Plain Woodland and is restricted to mean annual rainfall of between 750 and 900 millimetres and elevations between 50 and 350 metres above sea level. An open woodland mainly containing grey box (Eucalyptus moluccana and Eucalyptus microcarpa) and forest red gum trees, it is mostly prevalent in Prospect near Prospect Reservoir, and also on the western edges of Fairfield City, Campbelltown LGA and Liverpool LGA.
- Cumberland Moist Shale Woodlands – Located in protected areas that are intermediate between Cumberland Plain Woodland on drier areas and the Western Sydney Dry Rainforest, the community has waxy-leaved shrubs and small trees in the understorey with a ground cover of herbs, fleshy twiners and grasses, which are usually absent in the surrounding grassy woodlands. Similar to its subgroup Western Sydney Dry Rainforest due to its moist habit, some of its species would include hairy clerodendrum (Clerodendrum tomentosum) and slender grape (Cayratia clematidea). Although most of its habitat has been cleared for housing and urbanization, where only 604 ha remain intact, there are pockets of it in the southwest parts of the Fairfield City Council area, northwest of Liverpool near Green Valley, Cecil Hills and the Wollondilly LGA.
  - Western Sydney Dry Rainforest – Predominantly cleared within the Cumberland Plain and a component of Moist Shale Woodlands, it occurs on the secured clay-rich soils of the wavy hills and ranges of western Sydney in around Abbotsbury near Calmsley Hill City Farm, and areas in the MacArthur region to the southwest, albeit in a very small isolated pocket. Grey myrtle (Backhousia myrtifolia) is the most prevalent species with a ground cover being sparsely made up of herbs and ferns. Other salient species include fig (Ficus rubiginosa), wild quince (Alectryon subcinereus) and whalebone tree (Streblus brunonianus). The rainforest canopy may include spotted gums, wattles and paperbarks. Shrubs such as hairy clerodendrum (Clerodendrum tomentosum) and large mock olive (Notelaea longifolia) are also present. Rainfall is usually below 900 millimeters per annum in the rainforests within Cumberland Plain.
- Cumberland Shale Plains Woodland and Shale-Gravel Transition Forest – Featuring a soft topography, it is an open grassy woodland mainly containing grey boxes, forest red gums, spotted gums and ironbarks. It features shale-influenced, nutrient-poor, reddish, sandy-clay soils that support a constituents of ironstone gravels. It ranges from a woodland to a forest with an understorey that may deviate between dense shrubs and a low thin shrub with an abundant ground cover of tussock grasses, shrubs and forbs. It was once was the most common variety of native vegetation in what is now western Sydney where it occurred on flat to undulating or craggy landscape at elevations reaching approximately 350 m above sea level. Only 10% of it remaining, the community is mostly found in Prospect, Wetherill Park, Prospect and Greystanes, Cecils Hills, Liverpool LGA, Marsden Park, Holsworthy and near Bankstown, albeit in small fragments of less than 5 hectares. The Shale-Gravel Transition Forest is grouped with the Shale Plains Woodlands by the EPBC Act, although the two have been differentiated.

=== Gallery ===
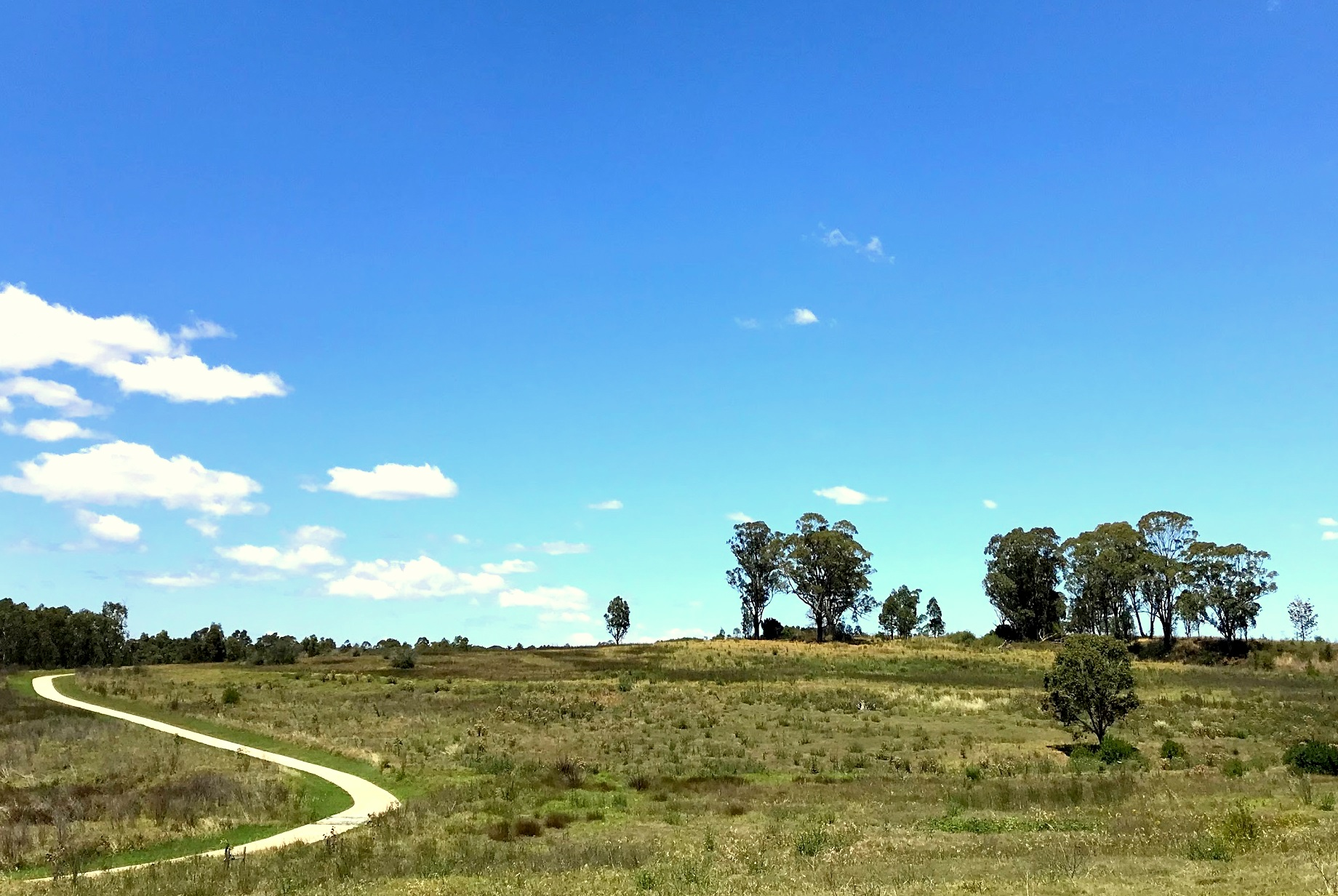
Shale Plains with walking track

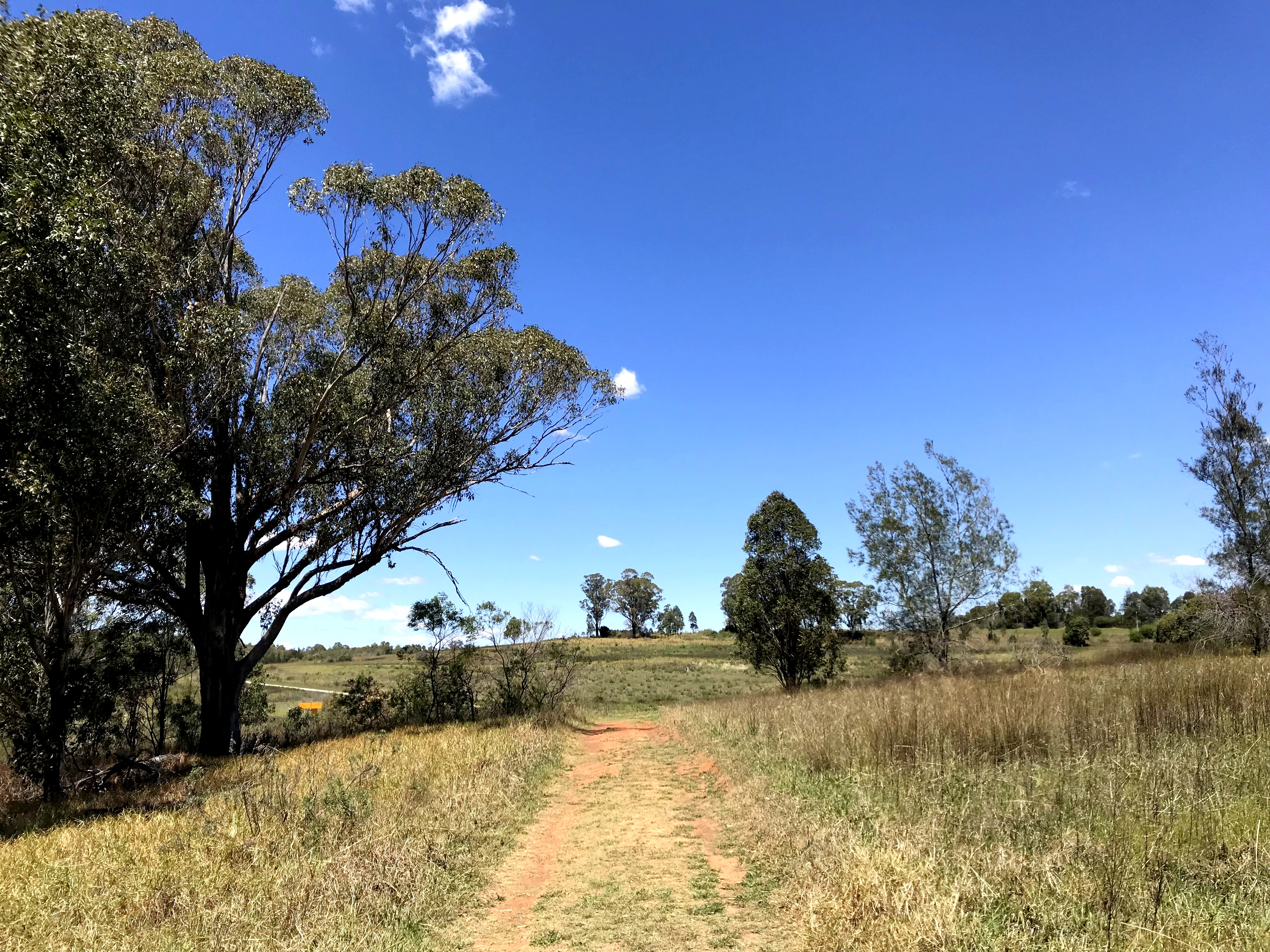
Shale Hills with offroad driving path

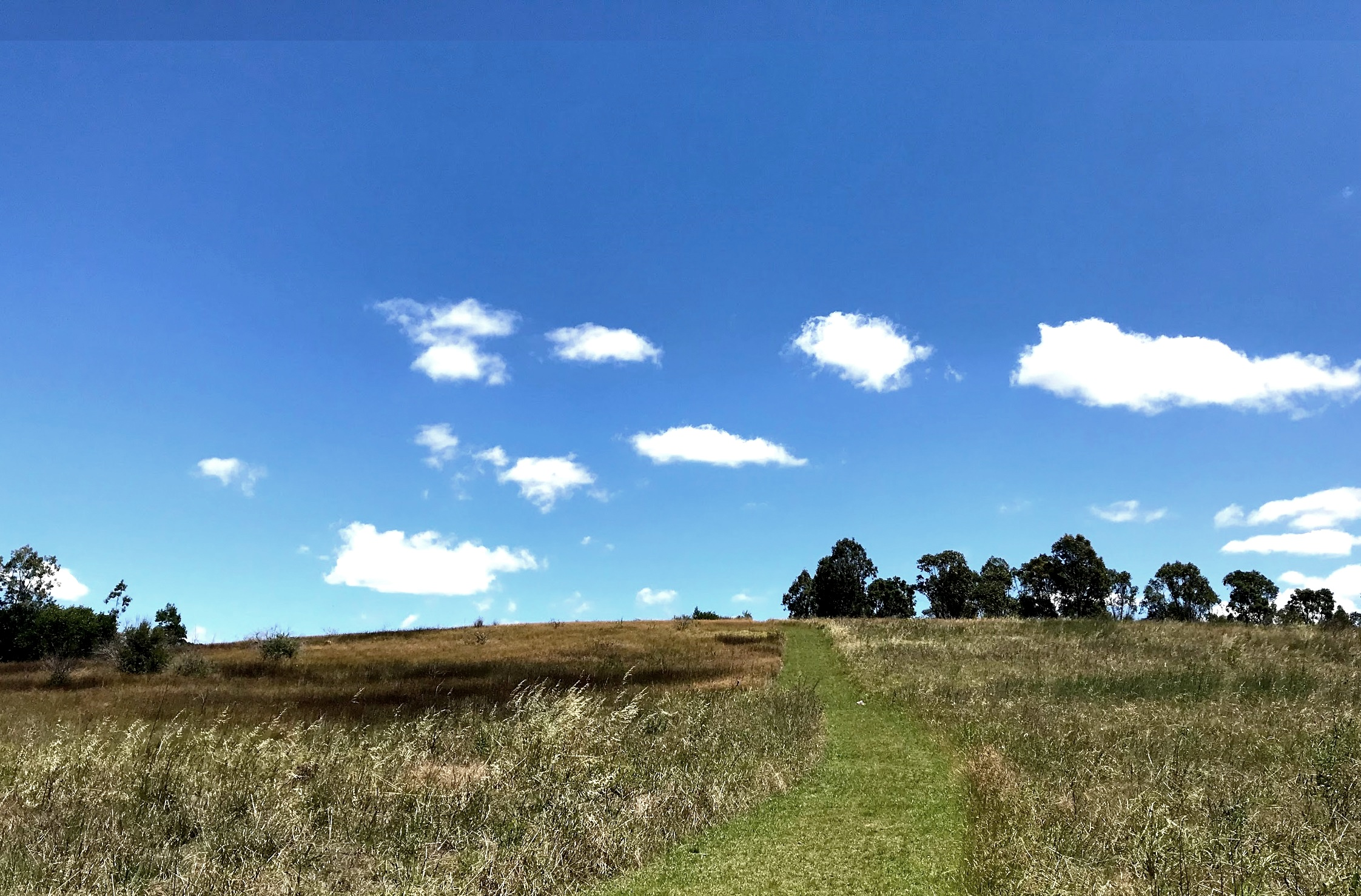
Shale Plains with a mowed track

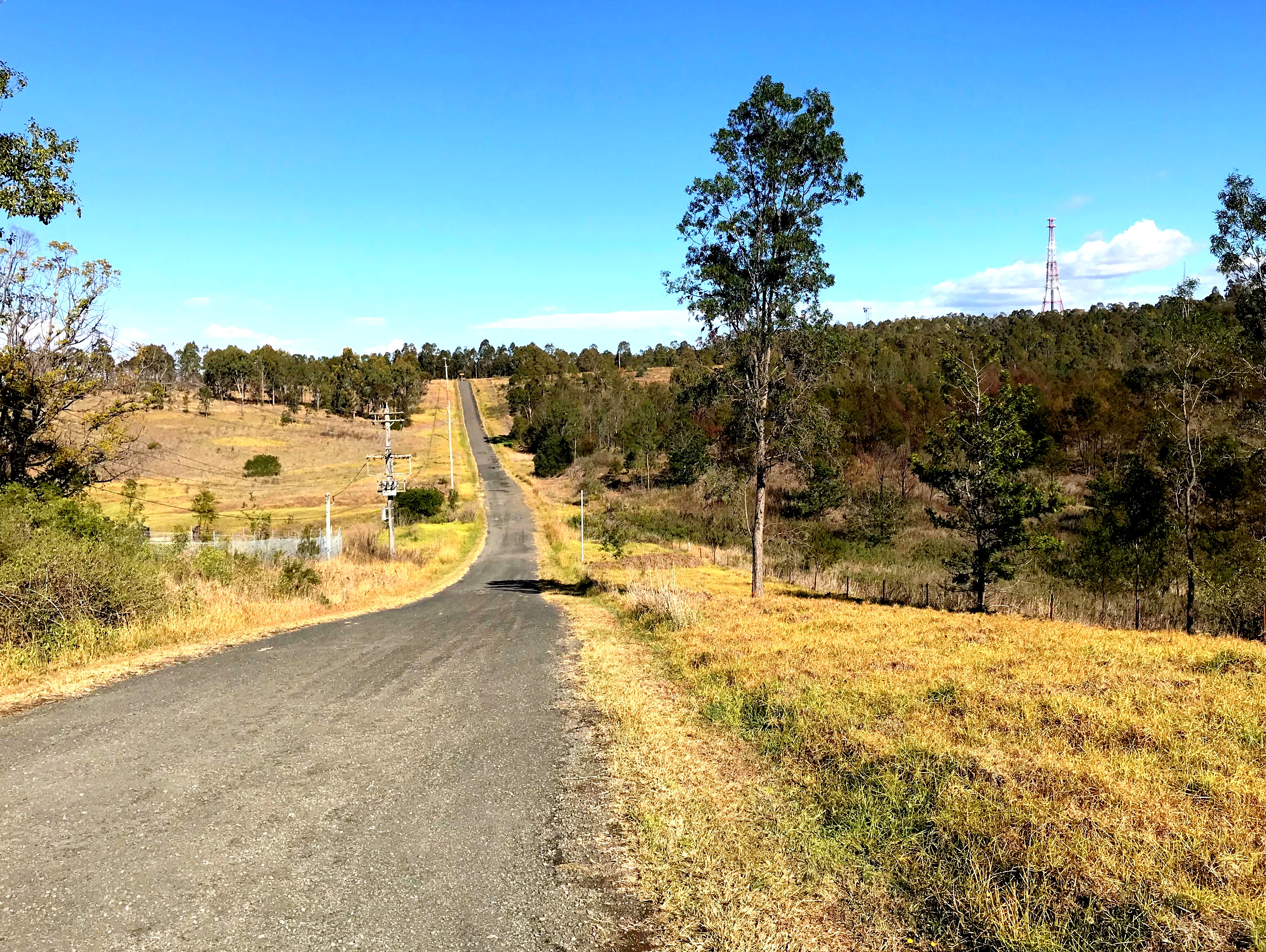
Shale Hills with a road traversing through it

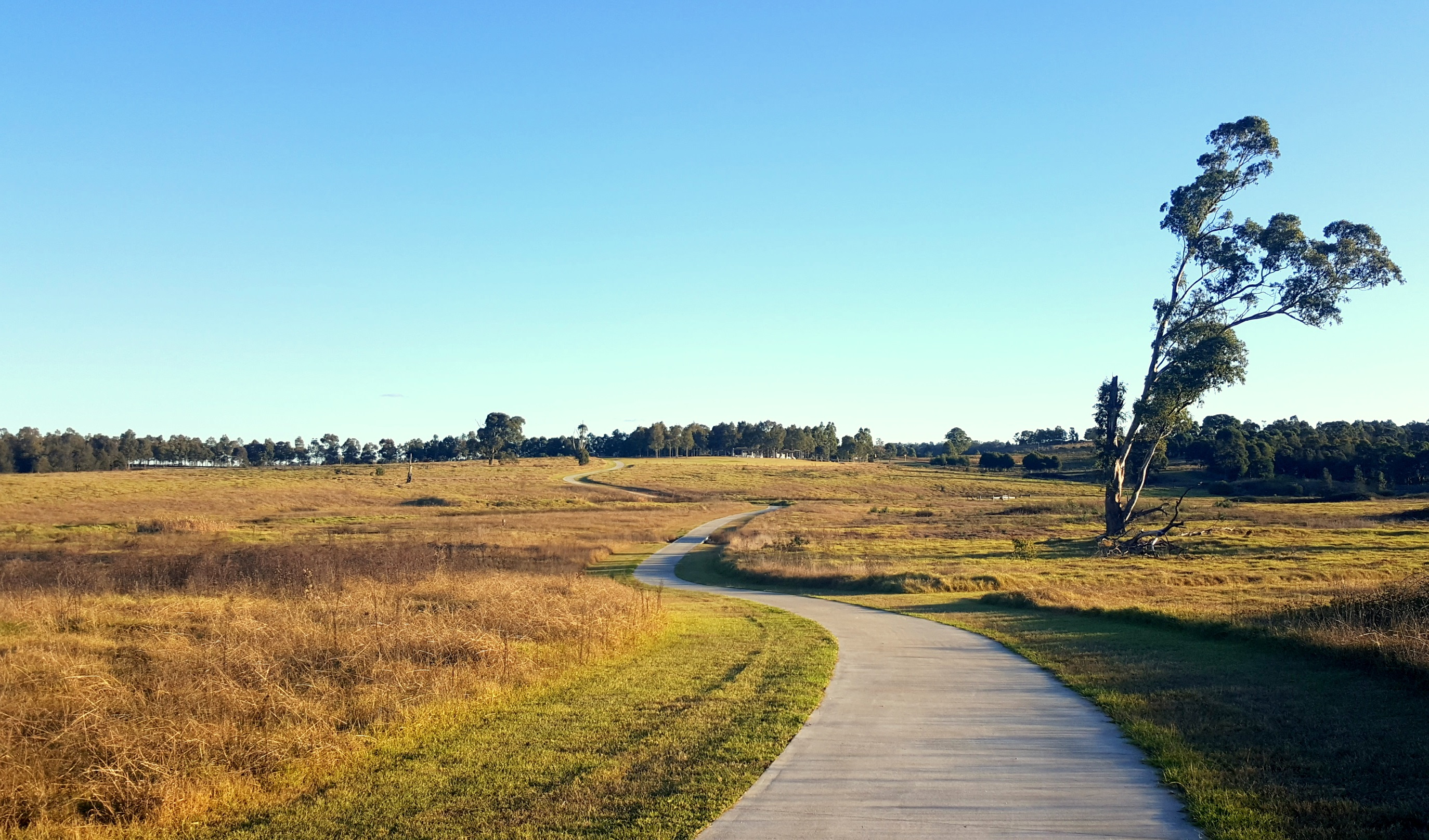
Shale Plains with modified landscape

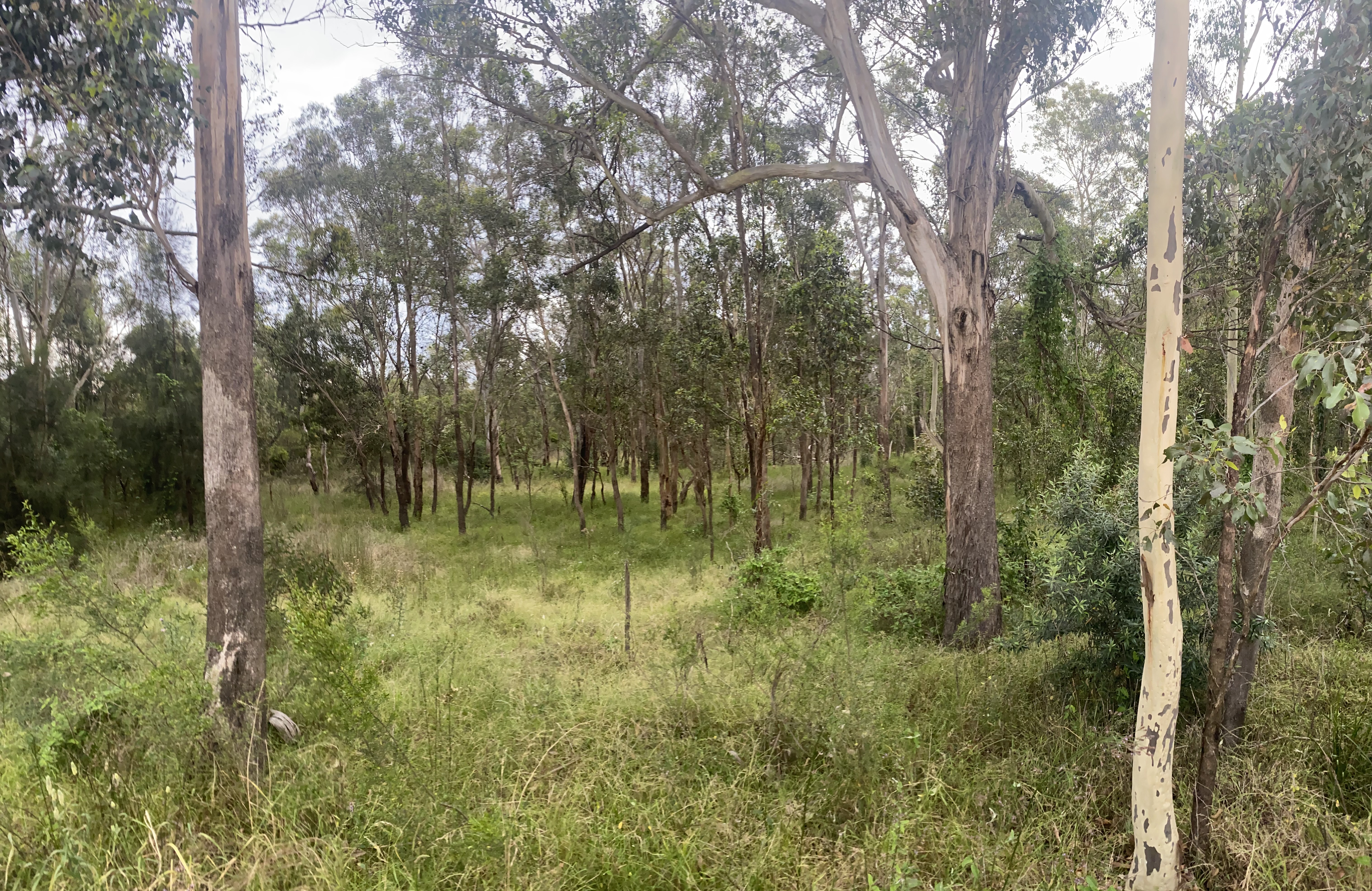
Shale-Gravel Transition Forest

== Vegetation ==
Selected tree and shrub species

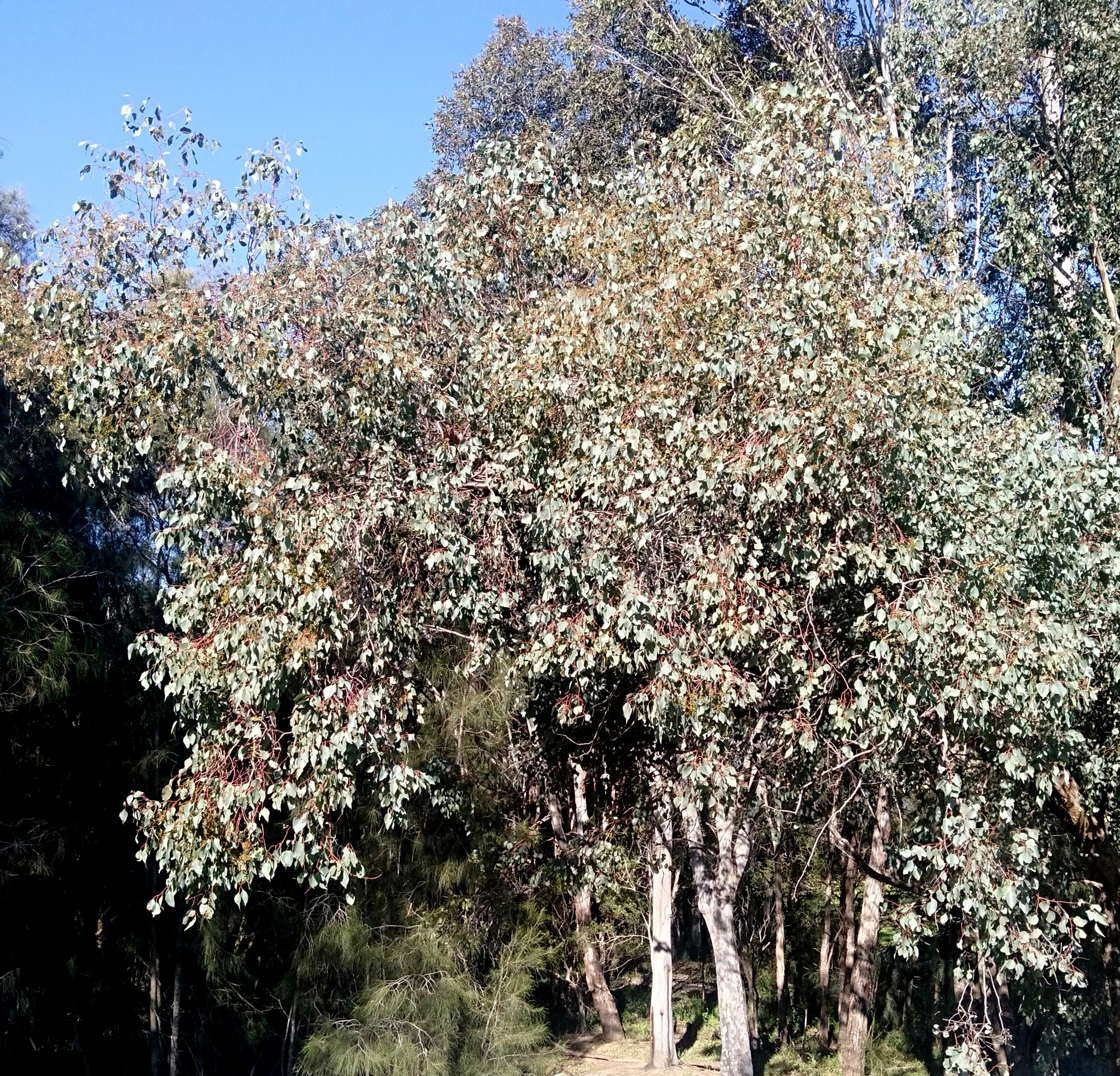
The Blue Box is a large tree found in the Cumberland Plain.

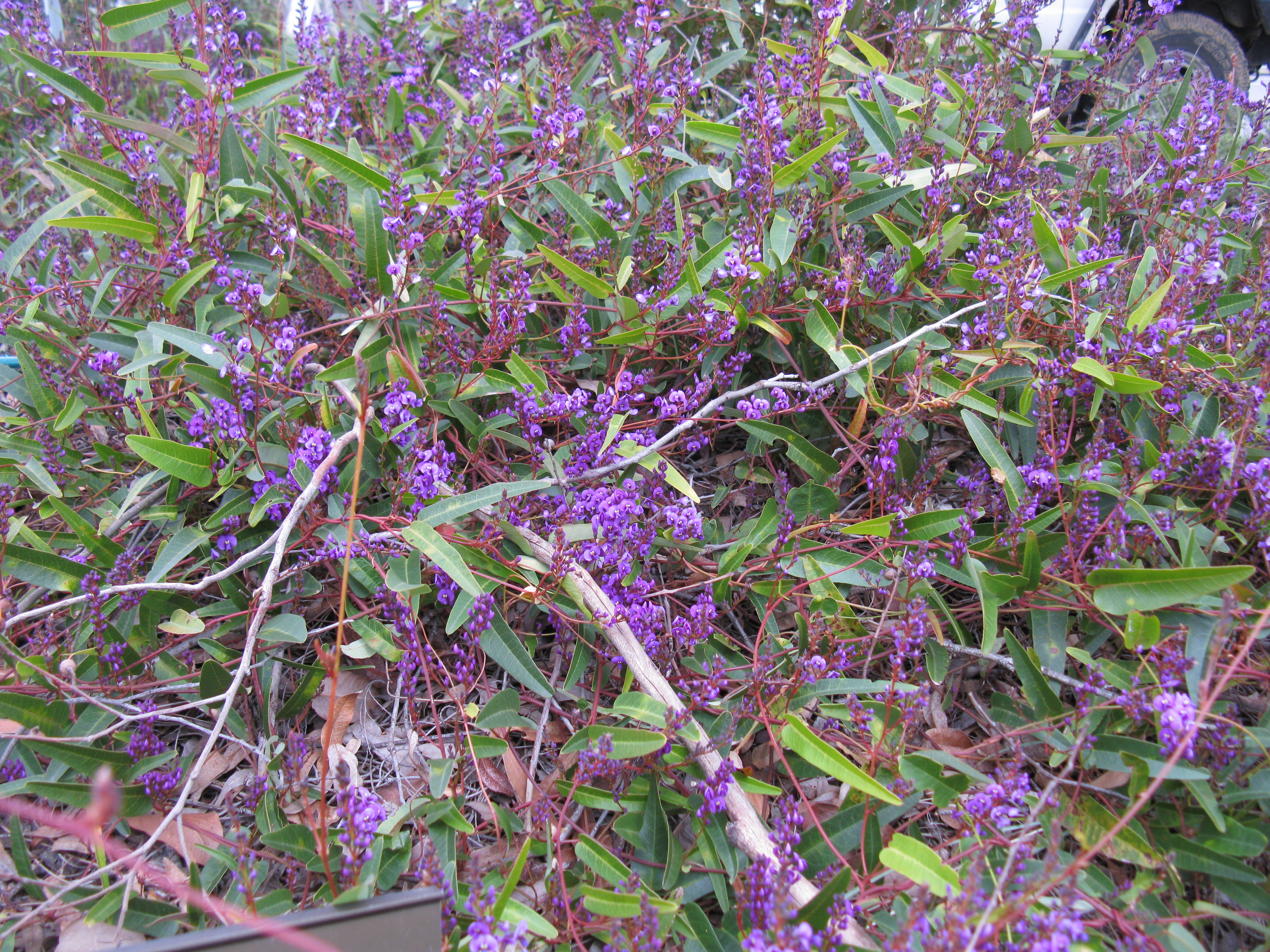
Purple coral peas are shrubby climbers found in the woodlands.

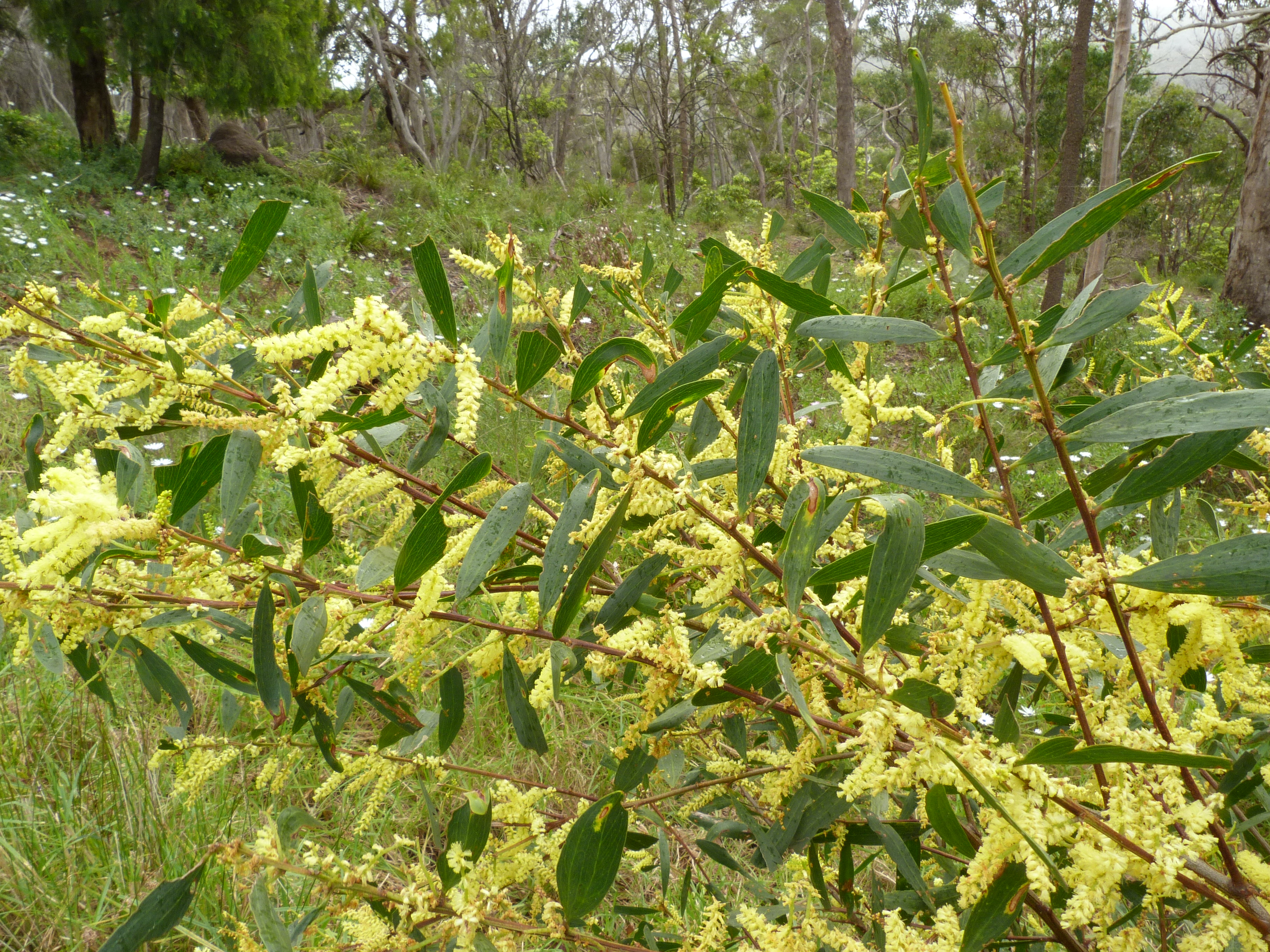
The Golden Wattle is usually a part of sclerophyll woodland communities

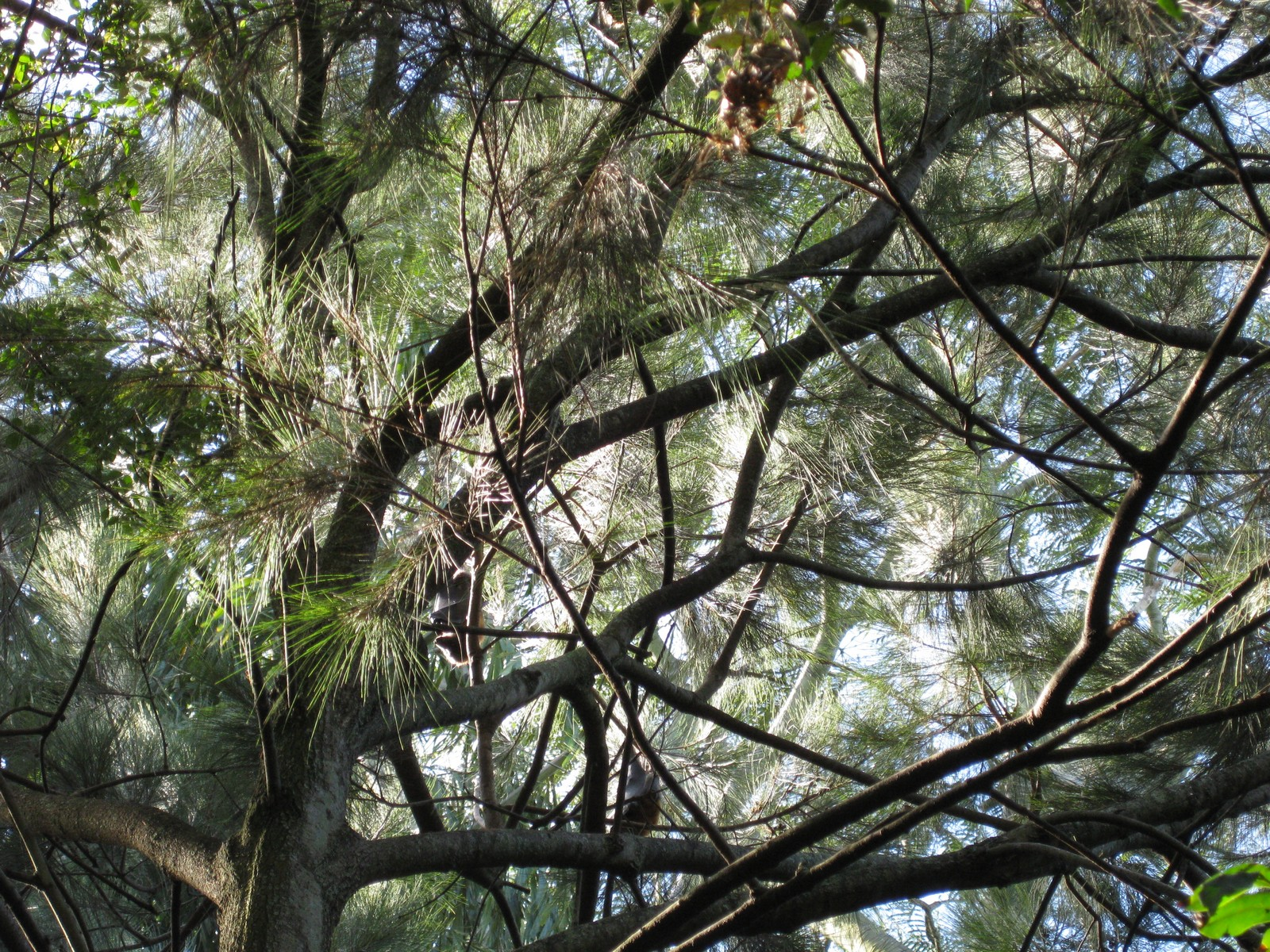
River Oaks are abundant in the riparian zones within the Cumberland Plain Woodland.

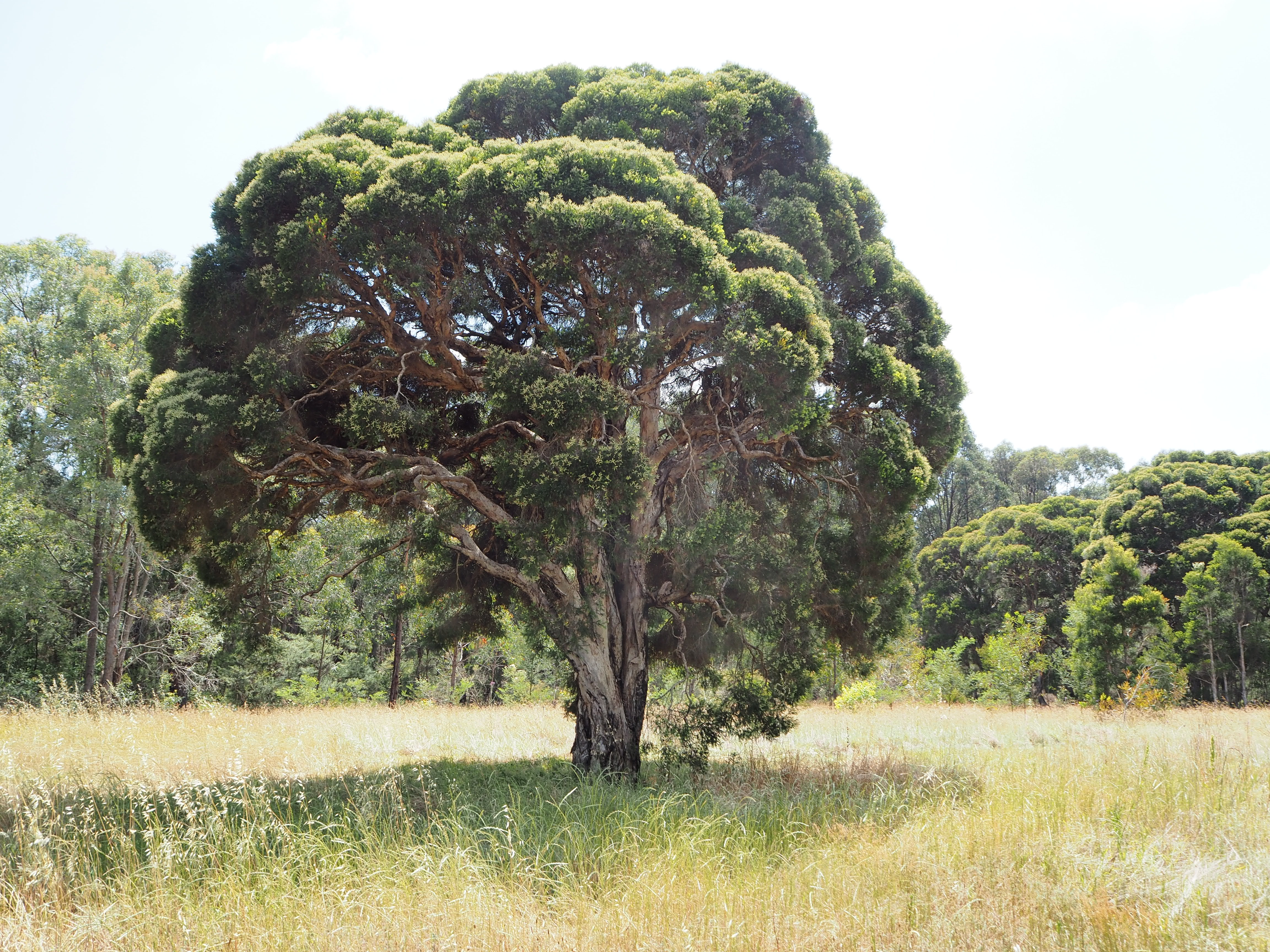
White feather honeymyrtle with lance-shaped leaves that is covered with creamy-coloured flowers.

The vegetation of the ecoregion includes grasslands, savanna, open woodlands, and some patches of sclerophyll forest lying on a nutrient-poor alluvium that was deposited by the Nepean River from sandstone and shale bedrock in the Blue Mountains. Despite this, they support a tremendous regional biodiversity.

The grassy woodland is dominated by grey box (Eucalyptus moluccana) and forest red gum (E. tereticornis), with narrow-leaved ironbark (Eucalyptus crebra), spotted gum (Corymbia maculata) and thin-leaved stringybark (Eucalyptus eugenioides) occurring sporadically, with a near-continuous grassy and herbaceous ground layer, and variable densities of shrubs and small trees. The ecoregion may have an open layer of small trees that would include such species of Acacia decurrens, Acacia parramattensis, Acacia implexa and Exocarpos cupressiformis.

Shrubs in the understorey are generally scattered, though their density can range from absent to locally thick depending on past disturbance. The ground layer is mainly composed of a diverse array of grasses, although grass cover may be sparse beneath dense shrub thickets. The shrub layer mainly contains Bursaria spinosa, indigofera australis, Hardenbergia violacea, Daviesia ulicifolia, Lespedeza cuneata, Dillwynia, Dodonaea viscosa, with plenty grasses such as kangaroo grass (Themeda australis) and Weeping Meadow Grass (Microlaena stipoides).

Eucalyptus species:

- Eucalyptus amplifolia (cabbage gum)
- Eucalyptus sieberi (Silvertop Ash)
- Eucalyptus oblonga (stringybark)
- Eucalyptus capitellata (brown stringybark)
- Corymbia gummifera (red bloodwood)
- Eucalyptus racemosa (scribbly gum)
- Eucalyptus baueriana (blue box)
- Eucalyptus longifolia (woollybutt)
- Eucalyptus paniculata (grey ironbark)
- Eucalyptus punctata (grey gum)
- Eucalyptus melliodora (yellow box)

Non-eucalyptus trees:

- Acacia parramattensis (Parramatta wattle)
- Acacia longifolia (Sydney golden wattle)
- Melaleuca alternifolia (snow-in-summer)
- Melaleuca decora (white feather honeymyrtle)
- Melaleuca styphelioides (prickly-leaved paperbark)
- Alectryon subcinereus (native quince)
- Allocasuarina torulosa (forest oak)
- Tristaniopsis laurina (water gum)
- Melia azedarach (chinaberry tree)
- Backhousia myrtifolia (carrol ironwood)
- Notelaea longifolia (large mock-olive)
- Casuarina cunninghamiana
- Syncarpia glomulifera (turpentine tree)
- Clerodendrum tomentosum (hairy clairy)
- Bursaria spinosa
- Melicytus dentatus (tree violet)
- Acacia floribunda (white sallow wattle)
- Angophora bakeri (narrow-leaved)
- Angophora subvelutina (broad-leaved apple)
- Acacia decurrens (black wattle)

Shrubs:

- Pittosporum revolutum (yellow pittosporum)
- Solanum prinophyllum (forest nightshade)
- Breynia oblongifolia (coffee bush)
- Dichondra repens (kidney weed)
- Ajuga australis (Austral bugle)
- Daucus glochidiatus (Australian carrot)
- Centella asiatica (Asiatic pennywort)
- Solanum cinereum (Narrawa burr)
- Crassula sieberiana (Australian stonecrop)
- Aphanopetalum resinosum (gum vine)
- Pandorea pandorana (Wonga Wonga vine)
- Cayratia clematidea (native grape)
- Hardenbergia violacea (purple coral pea)
- Cheilanthes distans (bristly cloak fern)
- Chrysocephalum apiculatum (yellow buttons)
- Pratia purpurascens (white root)
- Arthropodium milleflorum (pale vanilla lily)
- Chenopodium hastatum (berry Saltbush)
- Schenkia spicata
- Veronica plebeia (trailing speedwell)
- Stackhousia viminea
- Cestrum nocturnum (night-blooming jasmine)
- Rubus parvifolius (Australian raspberry)
- Ozothamnus diosmifolius (rice flower)
- Glycine tabacina (variable glycine)

Grasses and sedge:

- Cyperus gracilis (slender flat sedge)
- Oplismenus hirtellus (basket grass)
- Bothriochloa macra (red-leg grass)
- Fimbristylis dichotoma (eight day grass)
- Panicum effusum (hairy panic)
- Sorghum leiocladum (wild sorghum)
- Chloris truncata (Australian fingergrass)

== Wildlife ==
Cumberland Plain Woodland provides habitat for a broad variety of fauna, including small mammals, macropods, insectivorous and seed-eating ground birds, birds of preys, skinks, snakes, frogs, and numerous invertebrates. Thirty-seven mammal species have been recorded in CPW remnants over the past decade, although only 14 remain common and widespread. Frequently encountered species include Macropus giganteus (eastern grey kangaroo), Trichosurus vulpecula (common brushtail possum), Pteropus poliocephalus (grey-headed flying-fox), along with several microbat species. The ecosystem also supports a distinctive suite of birds often termed “shale birds”, comprising a mix of coastal species and those whose main distribution lies in the drier inland regions west of the Great Dividing Range.

Bird species in the woodland include (which are mostly vulnerable and/or endangered):

- Gang Gang Cockatoo
- Glossy Black-cockatoo
- Brown Treecreeper
- Painted Honeyeater
- Swift Parrot
- Square-tailed Kite
- Hooded Robin
- Black-chinned Honeyeater
- Turquoise Parrot
- Barking Owl
- Powerful Owl
- Speckled Warbler
- Diamond Firetail
- Masked Owl
- Sooty Owl
- Regent honeyeater

Mammals:

- Large-eared Pied Bat
- Spotted-tail Quoll
- Eastern False Pipistrelle
- Eastern Bent-wing Bat
- Eastern Freetail Bat
- Large-footed Myotis
- Yellow-bellied Glider
- Squirrel glider
- Koala
- Yellow-bellied sheath-tailed bat
- Greater Broad-nosed Bat

== Historical description ==
In April 1788, Governor Arthur Phillip describes the land west of Parramatta:

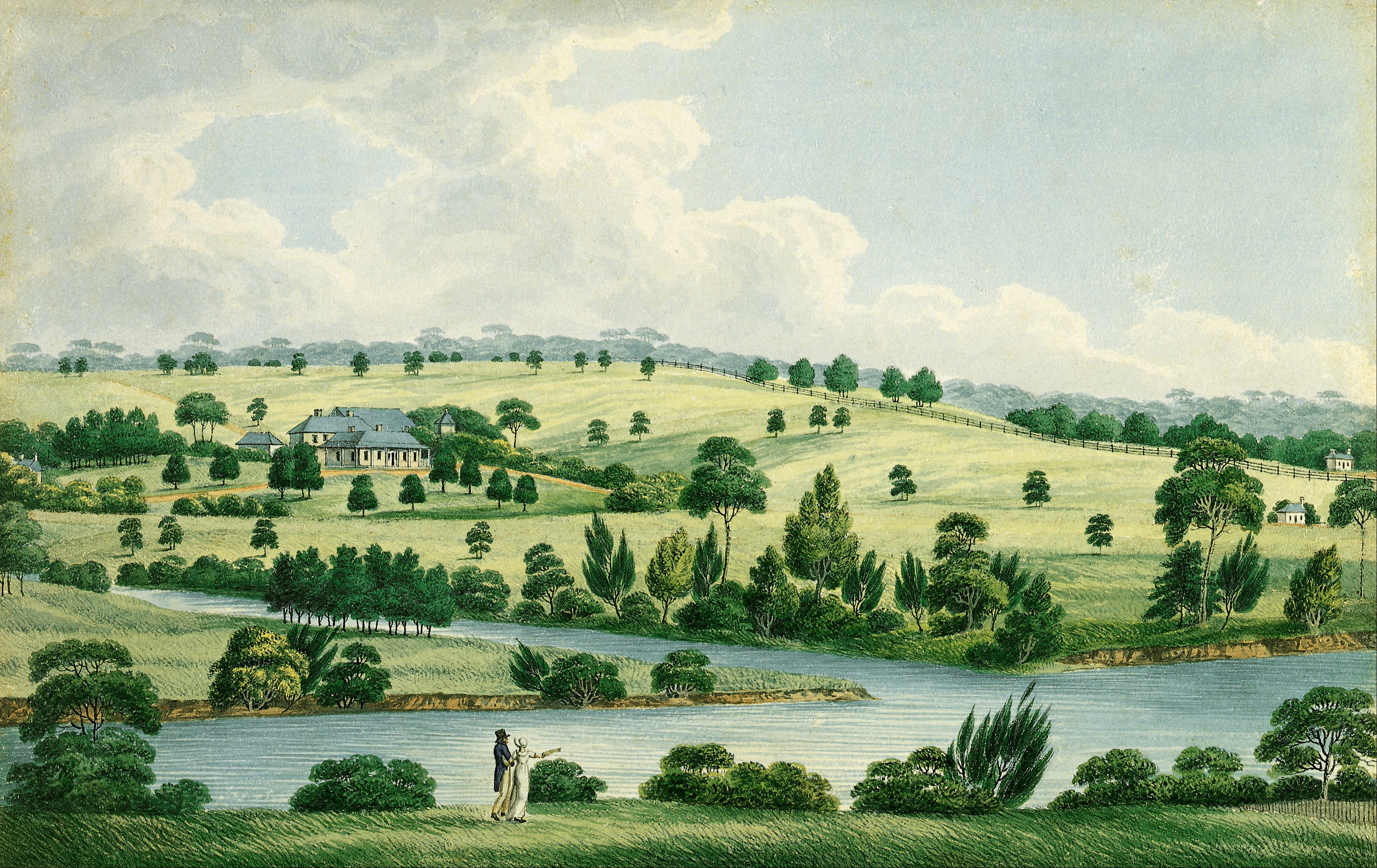
Parramatta in 1820s with grassy slopes and scattered trees.

The country through which they travelled was singularly fine, level, or rising in small hills of a very pleasing and picturesque appearance. The soil excellent, except in a few small spots where it was stony. The trees growing at a distance of from 20 to 40 feet [6–12 metres] from each other, and in general entirely free from brushwood, which was confined to the stony and barren spots.

In 1818, author and settler James Atkinson describes the plain as:

One immense tract of forest land extends, with little interruption, from below Windsor, on the Hawkesbury to Appin, a distance of 50 miles...Forest means land more or less furnished with timber trees, and invariably covered with grass underneath, and destitute of underwood...The whole of this tract, and indeed all the forest in this county, was thick forest land, covered with very heavy timber, chiefly iron and stringy bark, box, blue and other gums, and mahogany.

In 1819, British explorer William Wentworth describes Cumberland Plain's natural landscape between Liverpool and Nepean River:

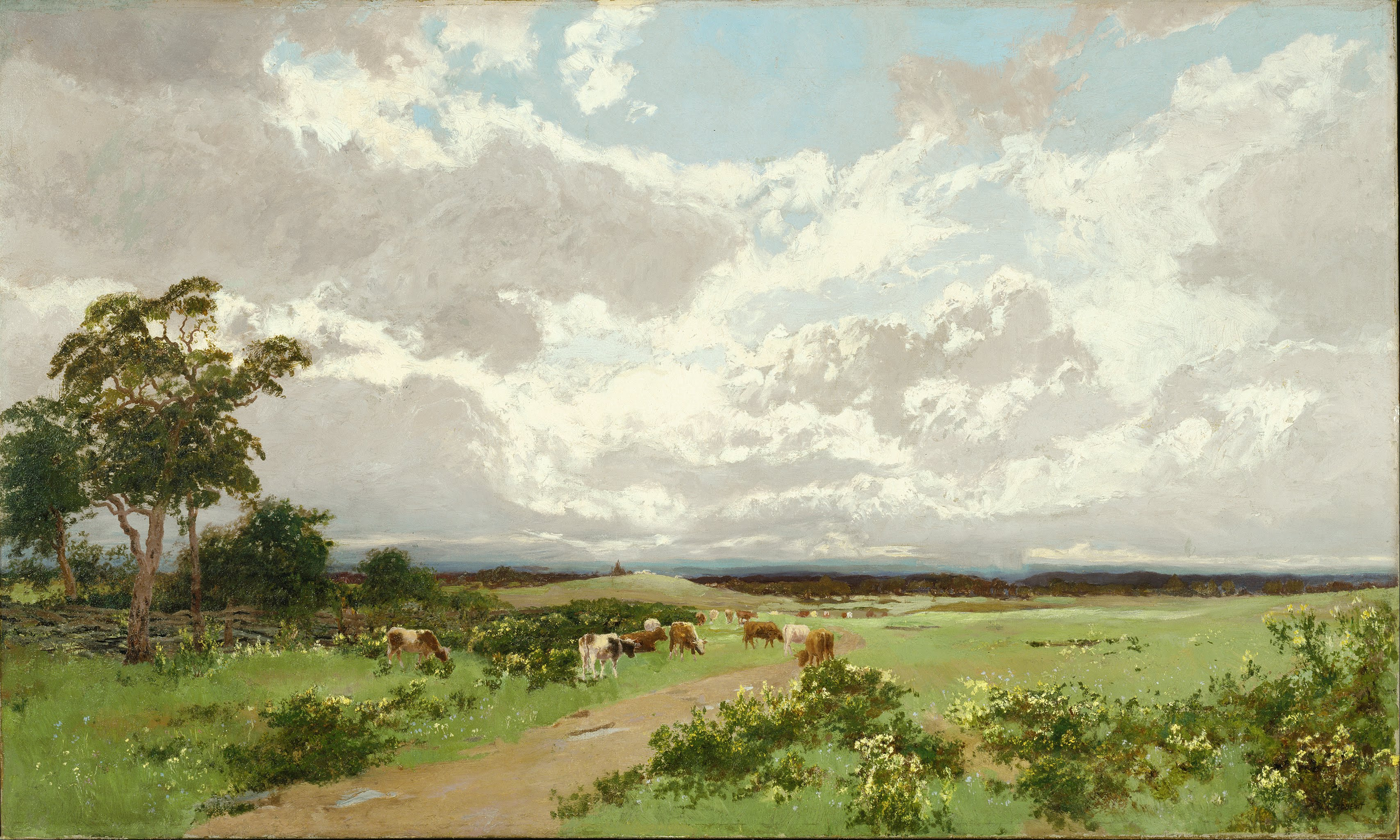
In 1820s, Peter Miller Cunningham described Cumberland Plain Woodland as "a fine timbered country, perfectly clear of bush...without any impediment in the shape of rocks, scrubs, or close forest".

The soil changes to a thin layer of vegetable mould, resting on a stratum of yellow clay, which is again supported by a deep bed of schistus. The trees of the forest are here of the most stately dimensions. Full sized gums and iron barks, along side of which the loftiest trees in this country would appear as pigmies, with the beefwood tree, or as it is generally termed, the forest oak, which is of much humbler growth, are the usual timber.

The forest is extremely thick, but there is little or no underwood. A poor sour grass, which is too effectually sheltered from the rays of the sun, to be possessed of any nutritive and fattening properties, shoots up in the intervals. This description of country, with a few exceptions, however, which deserve not to be particularly noticed, forms another girdle of about 10 miles (16 km) in breadth: so that, generally speaking, the colony for about 16 miles (26 km) into the interior, may be said to possess a soil, which has naturally no claim to fertility, and will require all the skill and industry of its owners to render it even tolerably productive.

At this distance, however, the aspect of the country begins rapidly to improve. The forest is less thick, and the trees in general are of another description; the iron barks, yellow gums, and forest oaks disappearing, and the stringy barks, blue gums, and box trees, generally usurping their stead. When you have advanced about 4 miles (6.4 km) further into the interior, you are at length gratified with the appearance of a country truly beautiful. An endless variety of hill and dale, clothed in the most luxuriant herbage, and covered with bleating flocks and lowing herds, at length indicate that you are in regions fit to be inhabited by civilized man. The soil has no longer the stamp of barrenness. A rich loam resting on a substratum of fat red clay, several feet in depth, is found even on the tops of the highest hills, which in general do not yield in fertility to the valleys.

The timber, strange as it may appear, is of inferior size, though still of the same nature, i. e. blue gum, box, and stringy bark. There is no underwood, and the number of trees upon an acre do not upon an average exceed thirty. They are, in fact, so thin, that a person may gallop without difficulty in every direction. Coursing the kangaroo is the favourite amusement of the colonists, who generally pursue this animal at full speed on horseback, and frequently manage, notwithstanding its extraordinary swiftness, to be up at the death; so trifling are the impediments occasioned by the forest.

== See also ==
- Cumberland Plain
- Ecology of Sydney
- Sclerophyll
- Geography of Sydney
- List of endangered ecological communities in NSW
- Lowland Grassy Woodland
