= Western Sydney Dry Rainforest =

Indigenous woodland community in Sydney, Australia

- Vegetation along Prospect Creek, featuring dense, sheltered vegetation characteristic of WSDR

Ecology
- Realm: Australasia
- Biome: Temperate Broadleaf and Mixed Forests
- Borders: Shale Sandstone Transition Forest; Cumberland Plain Woodland; Coastal swamp oak forest; River-flat eucalypt forest

Geography
- Area: 9.5 km^{2} (3.7 mi^{2})
- Country: Australia
- Elevation: 60–300 metres (200–980 ft)
- Coordinates: 34.1808°S 150.6798°E
- Geology: Sandstone, shale
- Climate type: Humid subtropical climate (Cfa)
- Soil types: Clay

The Western Sydney Dry Rainforest (WSDR) is a dry rainforest and vine-scrub community found in small pockets in south-western Sydney, New South Wales, Australia. A low closed forest, it is typically associated with gullies and steep, sheltered slopes.

Occasionally known as Western Sydney Dry Rainforest and Moist Woodland on Shale (Note: The name refers to the broader nationally listed ecological community, which includes Moist Shale Woodland, a distinct component associated with Cumberland Plain Woodland. Western Sydney Dry Rainforest grades into Moist Shale Woodland, forming a transition between rainforest and woodland vegetation.) and Hinterland Dry Rainforest, the ecological community is poorly conserved, with most remnants occurring on private land in patches smaller than 2 hectares. Mostly comprising sclerophyll vegetation, the ecological community is listed as critically endangered under Australia's national environmental law, the EPBC Act. More than 70 per cent of its original extent has been lost through land clearing, logging, weed invasion and heavy grazing.

== Characteristics ==
The community originally comprised a canopy of dry vine-thicket rainforest, with a similar understorey occurring in eucalypt forests and woodlands. Following partial clearing, it may now persist as woodland or shrubland. The community generally occurs on sheltered, clay-rich soils across gently undulating hills. Only about 950 hectares remain, almost all of which occurring as isolated patches under 10 ha in size. Moreover, it been variously classified as Dry Rainforest or Vine Thicket and is known as Cobbitty Vine Thicket. The community is estimated to have originally covered between 8,120 and 9,200 hectares prior to European settlement.

The community has declined to approximately 338 hectares, representing 26.4% of its original extent. The ecological community comprises dry rainforest that transitions into moist woodland, and it occurs in areas with higher rainfall than the surrounding western Sydney plains, at elevations of up to 300 metres above sea level. It generally occurs on south-facing slopes at elevations below 200 metres, in areas receiving less than 900 mm of average annual rainfall. Elsewhere, the rainforest is found at higher elevations and in areas of greater rainfall, growing on a variety of clay-influenced soils between the Shoalhaven River and Hawkesbury River. The community features a diverse range of moisture-dependent plants, including broad-leaved shrubs and ferns. The rainforest species, which have high conservation value, are sensitive to fire and rely on sheltered locations and dense vegetation for protection.

== Distribution ==
The Western Sydney Dry Rainforest (WSDR) is a dry, scrubby vegetation community scattered across the Cumberland Plain, occurring mainly on sheltered slopes and in gully bottoms and ranges of western Sydney and the southern Blue Mountains. It is generally found in areas of higher rainfall than the surrounding western Sydney plains, particularly in steep, rugged and hilly terrain, although some remnants extend into gentler, undulating landscapes. The ecological community is generally found at higher elevations with greater rainfall than much of the Cumberland Plain Woodland, growing on clay soils derived from Wianamatta Shale. The community has undergone a severe decline in ecological integrity due to the combined effects of habitat fragmentation, weed invasion, fauna loss, heavy grazing and changes to natural fire regimes.

The community occurs mainly along the elevated Razorback Range between Cobbitty and Picton, as well as sporadically elsewhere in Western Sydney, including Camden, Grose Vale, Cattai National Park, Campbelltown, Abbotsbury (near Calmsley Hill City Farm in Western Sydney Regional Park), and as well to the north in Richmond, Kurrajong, Parramatta, Ryde, Baulkham Hills, where it grades from a dry rainforest with a closed non-eucalypt canopy into moist woodland with an open canopy dominated by eucalypts. Small remnants of the riparian form of the community occur along the steeper, sheltered banks of Cabramatta Creek, including at Irelands Bridges Reserve, and along sections of Prospect Creek, including behind Fairfield High School.

== Ecology ==
Dense rainforest vegetation at Cattai National Park, featuring a shaded canopy and tangled understorey.

The dry rainforest is a low, closed forest that mostly features non-eucalypts, such as Backhousia myrtifolia (most dominant and most abundant rainforest species), Melaleuca styphelioides (typically found in sheltered gullies and on lower slopes of canopy layer), Acacia implexa (widespread in hillside drainage lines), Alectryon subcinereus, Brachychiton populneus, Corymbia maculata (commonly an emergent layer), Melicope micrococca, Streblus brunonianus, Alectryon subcinereus and Melicope micrococca, with an understory of various shrubs, and a mostly sparse cover of grasses, vine thickets, ferns and other herbs such as Alchornea ilicifolia. Plants that generally occur in other types of rainforest/moist woodland in New South Wales are usually nonexistent in this community, such as palms and mosses. Although not dominant, eucalypts such as Eucalyptus tereticornis and Eucalyptus moluccana occur in the community.

Shrubs include Notelaea longifolia, Breynia oblongifolia, Spartothamnella juncea, Marsdenia viridiflora, Clerodendrum tomentosum and Pittosporum revolutum, with vines such as Aphanopetalum resinosum, Pandorea pandorana and Causonis clematidea. Most remnants of the community occur on privately owned land. Due to its restricted distribution, the recovery plan identified these remnants for potential protection through measures such as reservation, environmental protection zoning and development controls. Vines include Aphanopetalum resinosum, Cayratia clematidea, Celastrus australis, Cissus antarctica, Clematis glycinoides var. glycinoides, Eustrephus latifolius, Geitonoplesium cymosum, Glycine clandestina, Pandorea pandorana, Ripogonum album, Rubus parvifolius, Sarcopetalum harveyanum and Stephania japonica var. discolor. The dry rainforest community at Mount Annan has been heavily affected by the invasive African olive (Olea europaea subsp. cuspidata), which spread across the summit between 1984 and 2014, eventually covering it and spreading into other areas of the garden. Conservation efforts have involved removing African olive to encourage the regeneration of native plants. Tradescantia fluminensis is a conspicuous weed in the understorey.

Fauna species include Mixophyes iteratus, Alectura lathami, Stagonopleura guttata, Acanthorhynchus tenuirostris and Anthochaera phrygia. The vegetation community provides habitat for a diverse range of fauna, including small mammals (particularly microbats), insectivorous, fruit-eating and seed-foraging ground-dwelling birds, birds of prey, skinks, snakes, frogs and numerous invertebrates.

== See also ==
- Temperate and subtropical rainforests of New South Wales
