= Wetherill Park Nature Reserve =

Urban park in Sydney, Australia

Wetherill Park Reserve
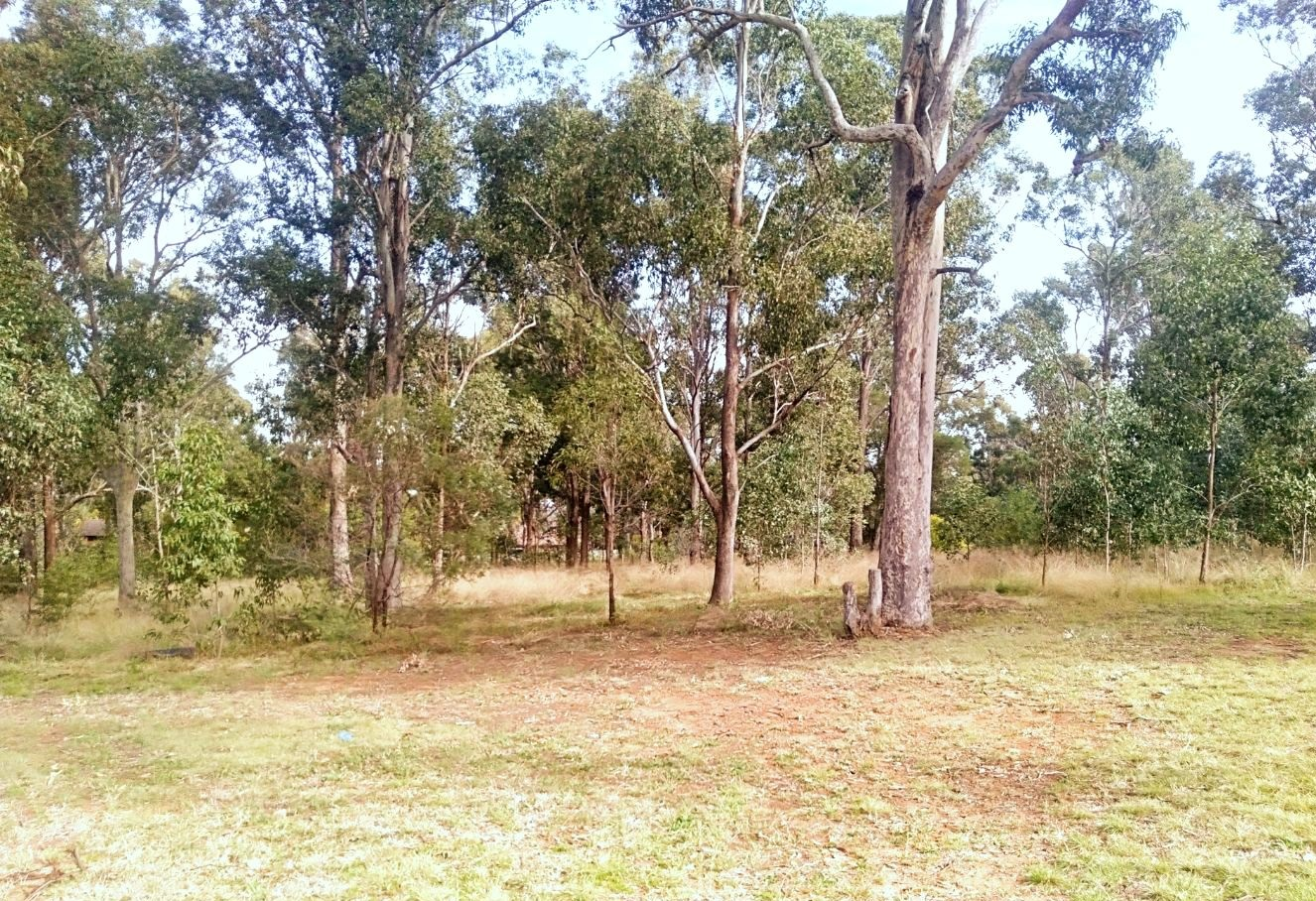

- Location within New South Wales
- Type: Woodland, urban park, nature reserve
- Location: Wetherill Park
- Coordinates: 33°50′52″S 150°54′34″E
- Area: 6.5 hectares (16.06 acres)
- Opened: 1979
- Operator: Fairfield City Council
- Status: Open all year

Wetherill Park Nature Reserve, also called Wetherill Park Reserve and Wetherill Park District Park, is an urban park and a nature reserve situated in the western suburbs of Sydney, New South Wales, Australia. The reserve contains an open woodland and bushland which feature native plants, such as eucalyptus trees, and recreational areas.

== Landform ==
The reserve is on an elevated ridge that is 62 metres (203 ft) high towards the eastern point of the park, which features a broad panorama over the surrounding area within the park. The reserve is strategically placed between the industrial areas to the north and residential areas to the south of the park, thus giving a visual alleviation from these surroundings. The topsoil of many areas in the park has been eroded due to wind and water, leaving the clay sub soil exposed.

== Features ==
Recreational characteristics in the reserve include shaded picnic areas with barbeque, walking paths (which were installed in the early 2000s) and a number of children's playgrounds all within the native bushland. In the park, there is a prominent monument made in bluestone that is dedicated to the fallen World War I soldiers who had resided in Wetherill Park.

== Ecology ==
=== Flora ===
The reserve features a dry sclerophyll forest with an understory of sod grasses, and a gradient "meadow-like" grassland in the open areas. A number of native trees, such as, forest red gum and grey box are found in the park, which are remnants of the Cumberland Plain Woodland. The trees would stand at 10–15 metres (33–49 ft) and would provide shade. There is a differentiation between the vegetation at the western and eastern borders of the park. The trees on the western end are more thinly distributed, whilst those in the eastern portion are more lush with a grassy floor.

Native trees such as paperbarks, she-oaks and bottlebrush have been recently planted. Bunya pines (Araucaria bidwillii) are also found in the reserve. Furthermore, some of the trees have sustained damages in their branches and trunks. Pine logs and wharf timbers are used to enclose the car park space.

=== Fauna ===
The reserve contains Australian animals, namely birds, such as, Australian magpie, galah, sulphur-crested cockatoo, eastern rosella and noisy miner. Brushtail possums have been spotted in the park, but there have been no records of such sightings since the late 1990s. Frogs and lizards were also common sightings before the 21st century.

== See also ==
- Western Sydney Regional Park
