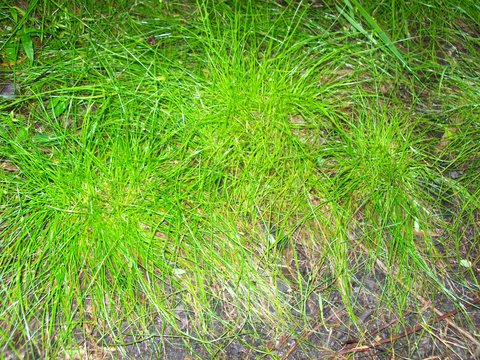
- Cyperus gracilis at Eastwood, Australia

Scientific classification
- Kingdom: Plantae
- Clade: Tracheophytes
- Clade: Angiosperms
- Clade: Monocots
- Clade: Commelinids
- Order: Poales
- Family: Cyperaceae
- Genus: Cyperus
- Species: C. gracilis

Binomial name
- Cyperus gracilis R.Br.

Synonyms
- Eucyperus gracilis (R.Br.) Rikli; Cyperus gracilis f. viviparus Domin

= Cyperus gracilis =

Slender flatsedge

Species of plant

Cyperus gracilis, commonly known as slender flat sedge and slimjim flatsedge, is a species of sedge native to Australia. The species epithet gracilis refers to the graceful form of the leaves.

The plant grows 10–30 centimetres (3.9–11.8 in) in height, with a delicate arching form. Flowering occurs in spring and summer.

== Distribution ==
Cyperus gracilis is found from the state of Victoria, north to New South Wales and Queensland, in eastern Australia. Its habitat can range from high rainfall areas near the coast to drier areas in woodlands, such as Lightning Ridge. It is also naturalized in Norfolk Island, the Canary Islands, Hawaii, and California.

== See also ==
- List of Cyperus species
