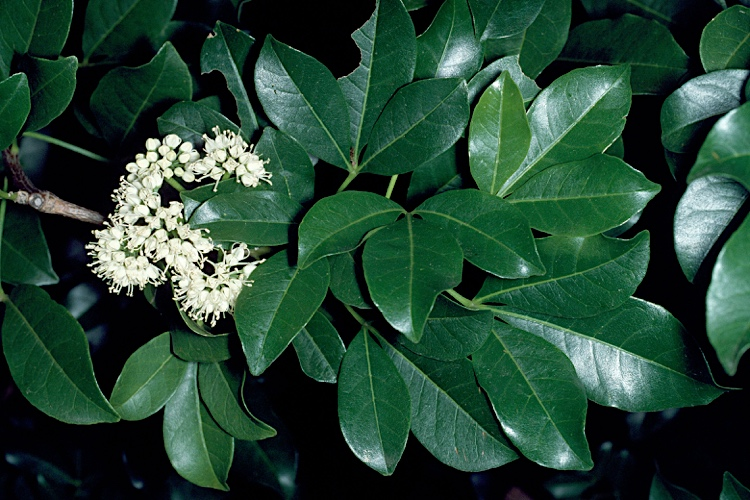
- Melicope micrococca

Scientific classification
- Kingdom: Plantae
- Clade: Tracheophytes
- Clade: Angiosperms
- Clade: Eudicots
- Clade: Rosids
- Order: Sapindales
- Family: Rutaceae
- Genus: Melicope
- Species: M. micrococca

Binomial name
- Melicope micrococca (F.Muell.) T.G.Hartley

Synonyms
- Ampacus micrococca Kuntze orth. var.; Ampacus micrococcus (F.Muell.) Kuntze nom. illeg.; Euodia micrococca F.Muell.; Euodia micrococca F.Muell. var. micrococca; Euodia micrococca var. pubescens L.R.Fraser & Vickery; Evodia micrococca Domin; Evodia micrococca var. pubescens L.R.Fraser & Vickery orth. var.

= Melicope micrococca =

Hairy-leaved doughwood

Species of tree

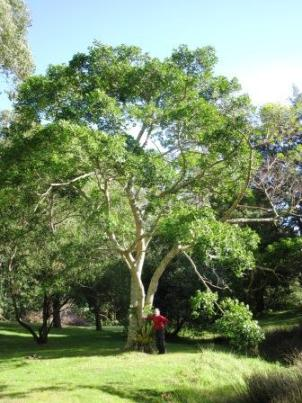
Habit

Melicope micrococca, commonly known as hairy-leaved doughwood or white euodia, is a species of shrub or slender tree in the family Rutaceae and is endemic to eastern Australia. It has trifoliate leaves and white flowers borne in panicles in leaf axils.

== Description ==
Melicope micrococca is a shrub or tree that typically grows to a height of 24–27 m (79–89 ft) with a dbh of 60 cm (24 in). It has a relatively smooth, pale brown trunk with some corky irregularities, and flanged at the base of larger specimens. The leaves are arranged in opposite pairs and trifoliate on a petiole 10–95 mm (0.39–3.74 in) long. The leaflets are egg-shaped with the narrower end towards the base, 25–130 mm (0.98–5.12 in) long and 12–50 mm (0.47–1.97 in) wide, the side leaflets sessile but the end leaflet on a petiolule 3–13 mm (0.12–0.51 in) long. The leaflets have visible oil dots and the underside is a paler shade of green. The flowers are borne in panicles 25–100 mm (0.98–3.94 in) long, mostly in leaf axils. The flowers are bisexual, the sepals 1–1.5 mm (0.039–0.059 in) long and joined at the base, the petals white and 3.5–5 mm (0.14–0.20 in) long, and there are four stamens. Flowering occurs from November to February and the fruit consists of up to four follicles 4–5 mm (0.16–0.20 in) long and joined at the base.

== Taxonomy ==
Hairy-leaved doughwood was first described in 1859 by Ferdinand von Mueller who gave it the name Euodia micrococca and published the description in his book, Fragmenta phytographiae Australiae from a specimen collected near Cabramatta by William Woolls. In 1990, Thomas Gordon Hartley changed the name to Melicope micrococca in the journal Telopea.

== Distribution and habitat ==
Melicope micrococca usually grows in rainforest and is found from near sea level to an altitude of 1,050 m (3,440 ft). Its natural range is from the Seven Mile Beach, New South Wales (34° S) to Maryborough, Queensland (25° S).

== Ecology ==
The fruit is eaten by a variety of birds, including the brown cuckoo dove, crimson rosella, green catbird and Lewin's honeyeater. Melicope micrococca is a target species for many insects, including butterflies in the family Papilionidae.
