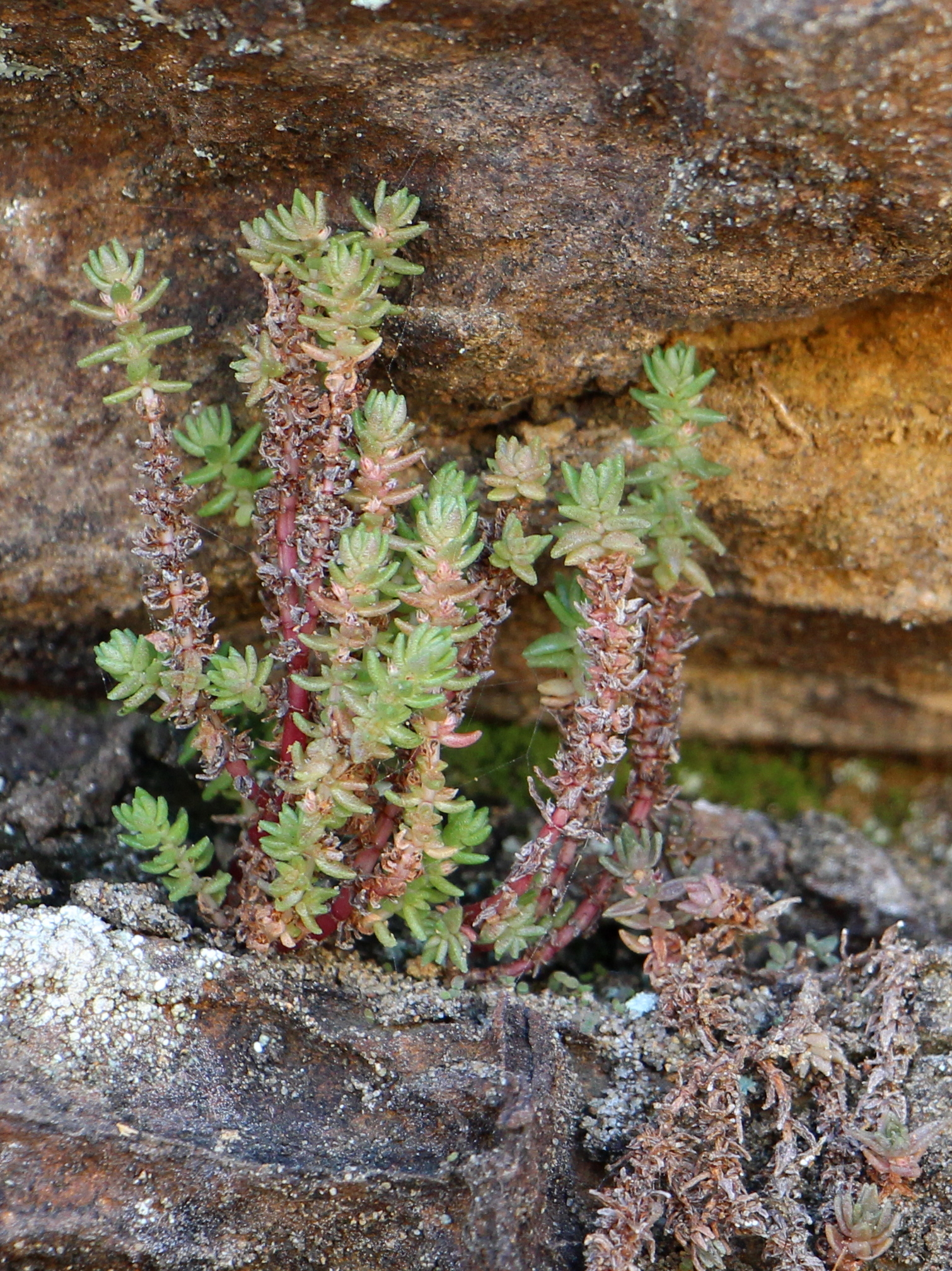
- Garie Beach, Australia

Scientific classification
- Kingdom: Plantae
- Clade: Tracheophytes
- Clade: Angiosperms
- Clade: Eudicots
- Order: Saxifragales
- Family: Crassulaceae
- Genus: Crassula
- Species: C. sieberiana

Binomial name
- Crassula sieberiana (Schult. & Schult.f.) Druce

= Crassula sieberiana =

Australian stonecrop

Species of succulent

Crassula sieberiana, the Australian stonecrop, is a succulent plant found in a variety of habitats in Australia, New Zealand and Lord Howe Island. It has been introduced to Hawaii. Usually seen in rock crevices. It may be found in desert areas such as Sturt National Park, or high rainfall areas near the coast including rainforest. Sub species are not recognized on New South Wales Plantnet, however some authors recognize several subspecies. It is listed as endangered in South Australia.
