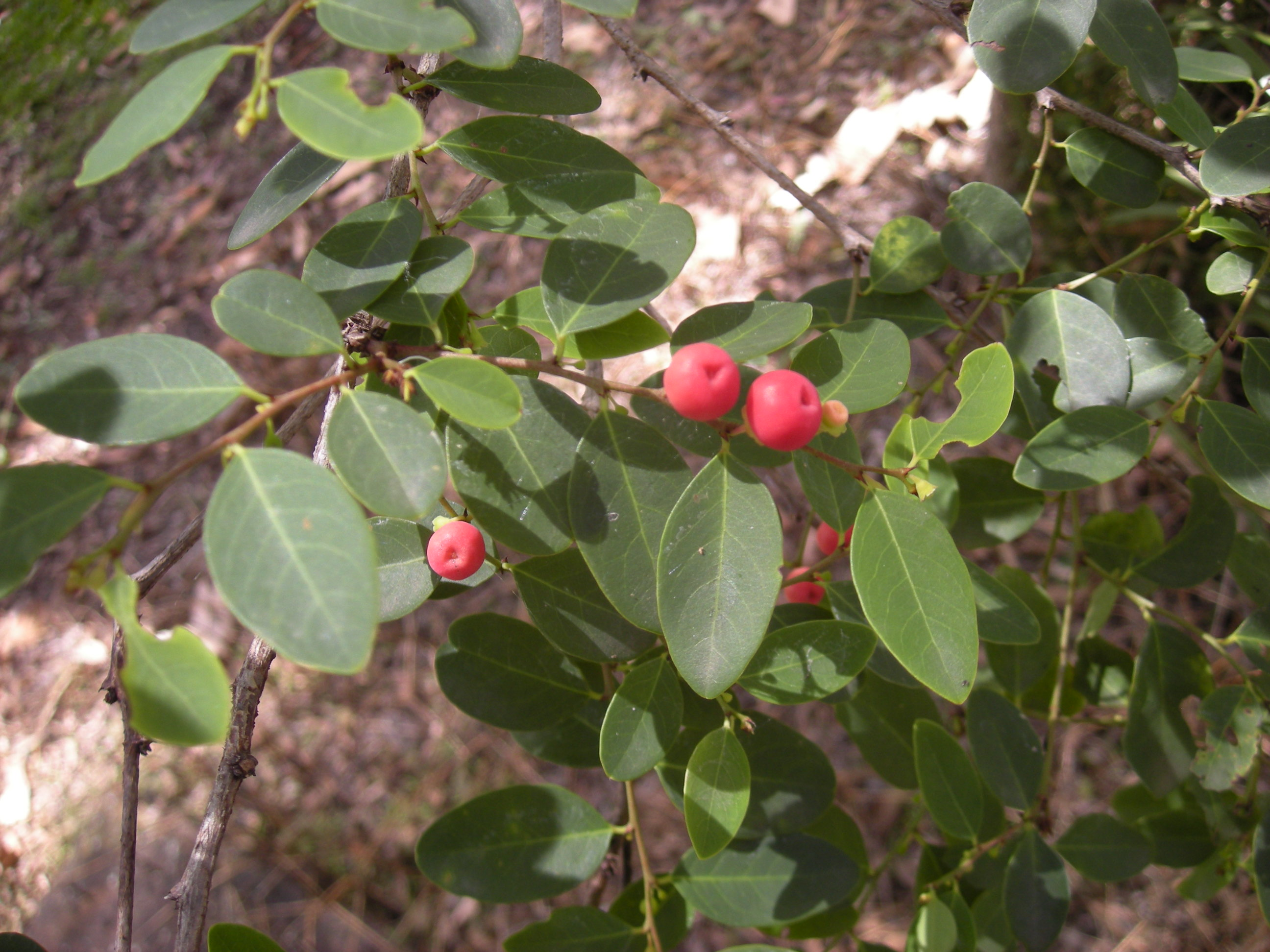
- Breynia oblongifolia fruit and foliage

Scientific classification
- Kingdom: Plantae
- Clade: Tracheophytes
- Clade: Angiosperms
- Clade: Eudicots
- Clade: Rosids
- Order: Malpighiales
- Family: Phyllanthaceae
- Genus: Breynia
- Species: B. oblongifolia

Binomial name
- Breynia oblongifolia (Mull.Arg.) Mull.Arg.

= Breynia oblongifolia =

Species of flowering plant

Breynia oblongifolia, commonly known as coffee bush, grows naturally in Australia and New Guinea as shrubs up to 3 m (10 ft) in height. The species produces alternate, distichous, ovate leaves 20–30 mm (0.8–1.2 in) long by 10–20 mm (0.4–0.8 in) wide. Small, green flowers are produced in spring and summer, and these are followed by orange or pink berries about 6 mm (0.24 in) diameter that turn black when fully ripe.

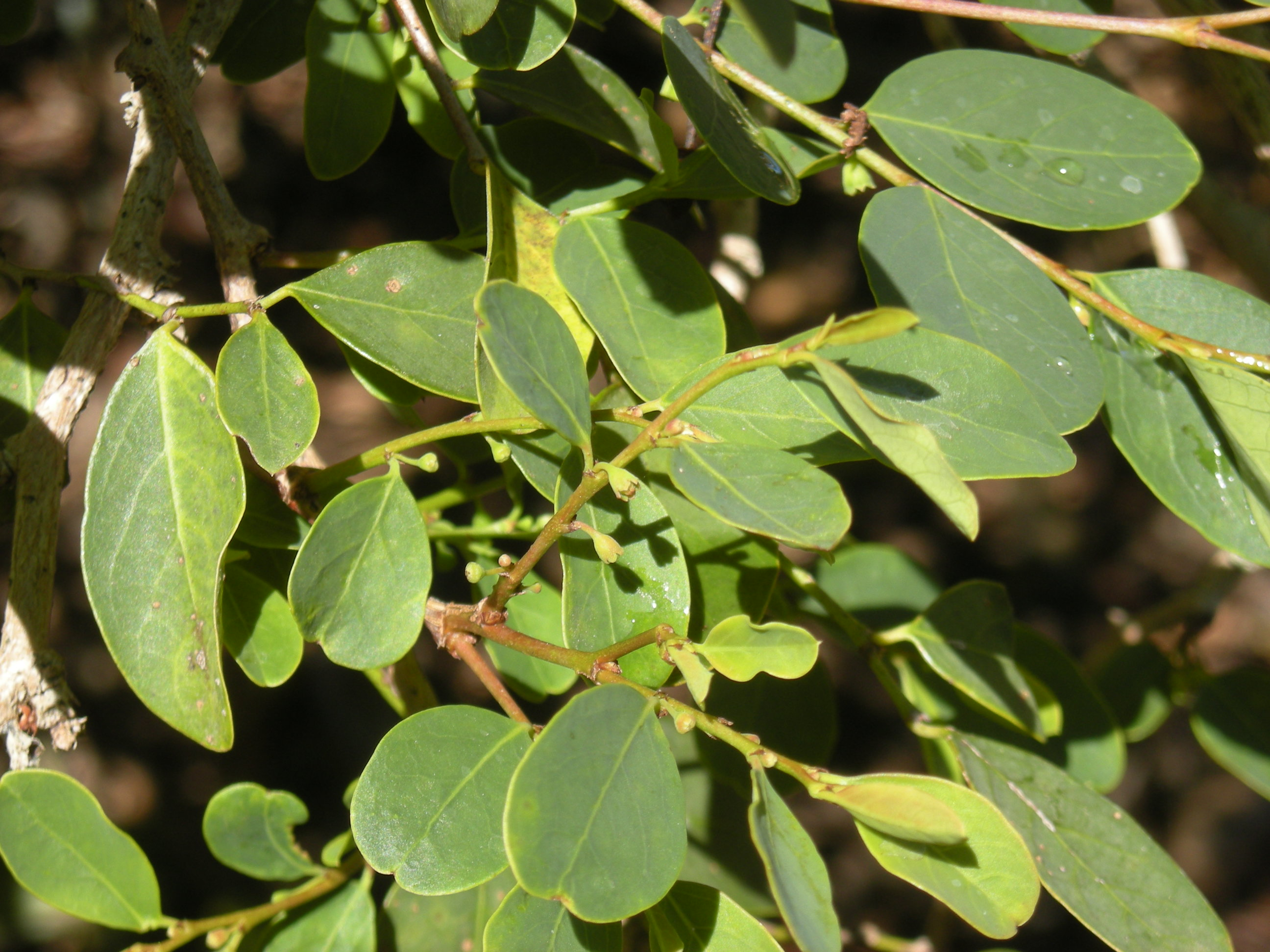
B. oblongifolia flowers.

The species tolerates wide variety of environments, and is found in coastal tropical rainforests in North Queensland and New Guinea through to cool Eucalypt woodlands in south–eastern New South Wales to arid Acacia woodlands in Western Queensland. This plant proliferates in disturbed areas and can recolonise cleared sites and can pop up occasionally in undisturbed gardens, the species will spread at the expense of fire-dependent species if fire is withdrawn from an ecosystem used to being burnt. This plant supports many different animals that feed on leaves, berries and flowers.

This native shrub may be confused with Senna species which are found in similar habitats, but Senna has pinnate leaves (leaf is divided into separate leaflets and a petiole) unlike the simple leaves of B. oblongifolia, and Senna produces conspicuous yellow flowers followed by leguminous pods in contrast to the inconspicuous flowers and red berries of B. oblongifolia.

Breynia oblongifolia presumably is dependent on leafflower moths (Epicephala spp.) for its pollination, like other species of tree in the genus Breynia. Leafflower moths have been reared from fruit of this species in Australia.
