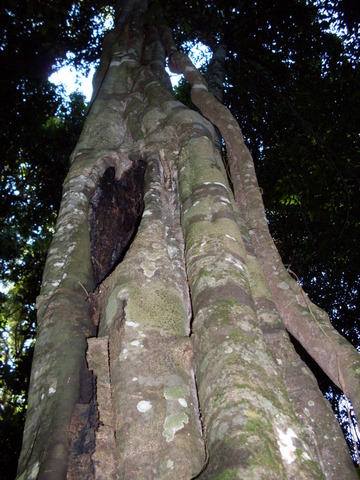
- large Alectryon subcinereus growing by the Hacking River, Australia

Scientific classification
- Kingdom: Plantae
- Clade: Tracheophytes
- Clade: Angiosperms
- Clade: Eudicots
- Clade: Rosids
- Order: Sapindales
- Family: Sapindaceae
- Genus: Alectryon
- Species: A. subcinereus

Binomial name
- Alectryon subcinereus (A.Gray) Radlk.

= Alectryon subcinereus =

Species of flowering plant

Alectryon subcinereus, commonly named native quince, wild quince or bird's eye, is a species of shrubs or small trees, constituting part of the plant family Sapindaceae.

They are endemic to eastern Australia, from far eastern Victoria northwards, through eastern New South Wales and through to central Queensland.
