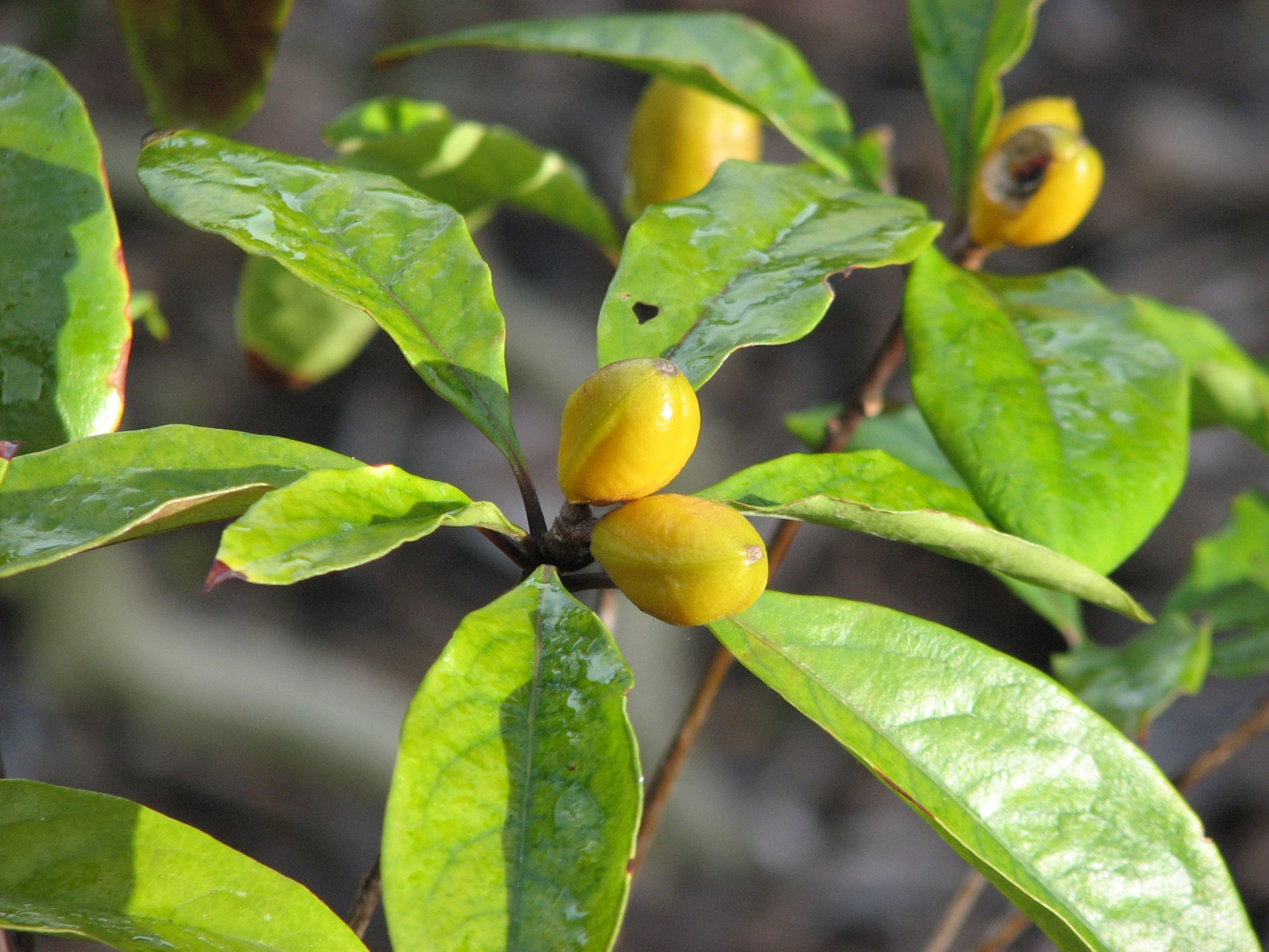

Scientific classification
- Kingdom: Plantae
- Clade: Tracheophytes
- Clade: Angiosperms
- Clade: Eudicots
- Clade: Asterids
- Order: Apiales
- Family: Pittosporaceae
- Genus: Pittosporum
- Species: P. revolutum

Binomial name
- Pittosporum revolutum Dryand. ex W.T.Aiton

= Pittosporum revolutum =

Species of shrub

Pittosporum revolutum, commonly known as rough-fruited pittosporum, yellow pittosporum, Brisbane laurel or wild yellow jasmine, is a flowering plant in the family Pittosporaceae and grows in New South Wales, Victoria and Queensland. It is a small shrub with fragrant yellow flowers.

== Description ==
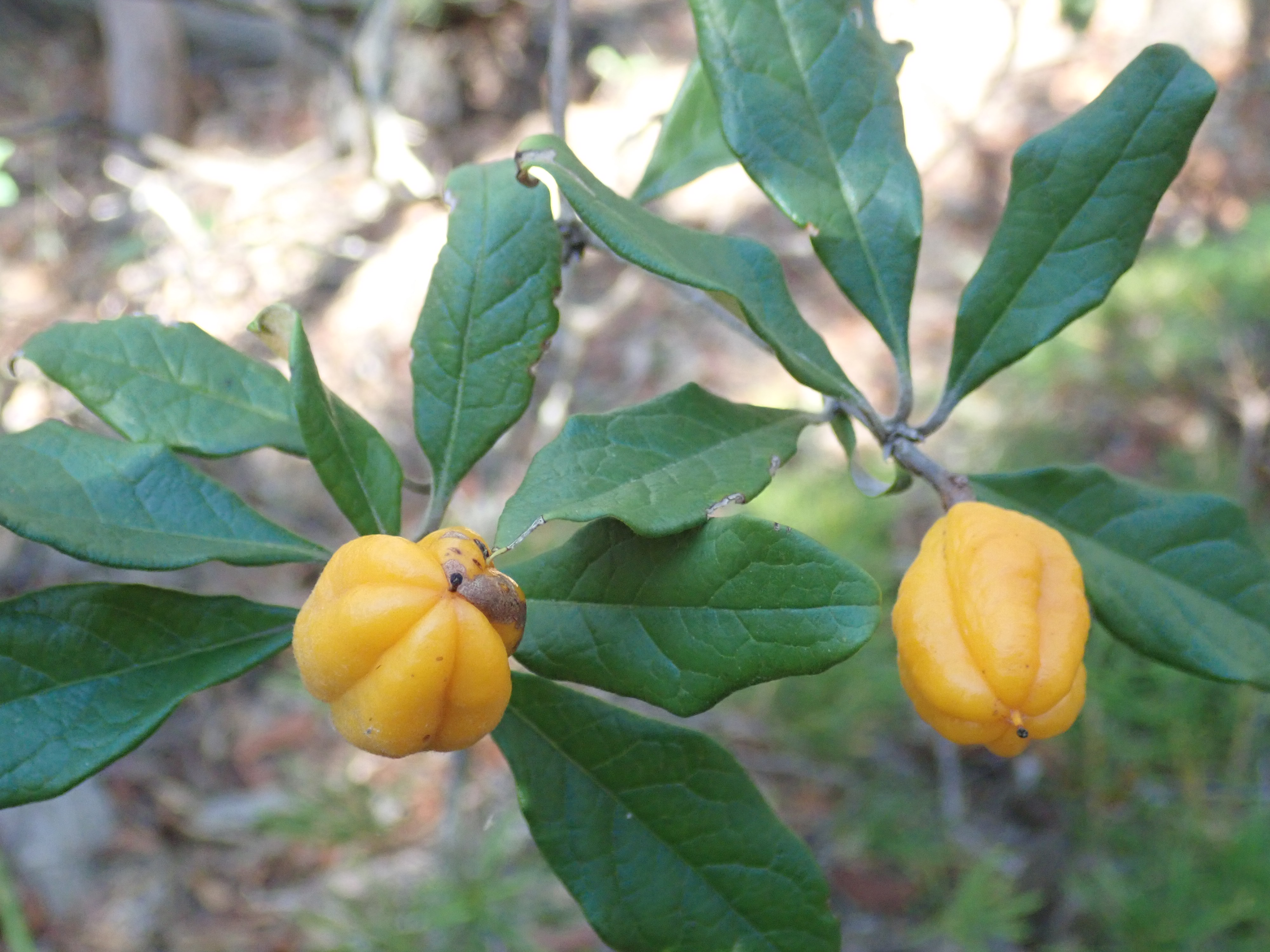
Leaves and fruit are often rough.

Pittosporum revolutum is a spreading shrub or small tree to about 1–4 m (3 ft 3 in – 13 ft 1 in) high, branchlets and leaves covered with rusty-coloured short matted hairs. The older leaves are smooth with occasional hairs on the lower surface, dull, dark green, alternately arranged or clustered, oval, elliptic or egg-shaped, 4–15 cm (1.6–5.9 in) long, 3–6 cm (1.2–2.4 in) wide, margins wavy or smooth. The fragrant, bisexual flowers, vary in number are borne at the end of branches in clusters, pedicels 4–15 mm (0.16–0.59 in) long, sepals lance-shaped about 5 mm (0.20 in) long, petals oblong-shaped, down-curved, 10–20 mm (0.39–0.79 in) long and yellow. Flowering occurs in September and October and the fruit is a yellow-orange coloured capsule, ellipsoid or globe-shaped, 12–20 mm (0.47–0.79 in) long, warty and wrinkled.

== Taxonomy and naming ==
Pittosporum revolutum was first formally described in 1811 by W.T.Aiton and the description was published in Hortus Kewensis. The specific epithet (revolutum) means "curling down" referring to the petals.

== Distribution and habitat ==
Rough-fruited pittosporum grows in sheltered situations on ranges and coastal areas of New South Wales, Victoria and Queensland.

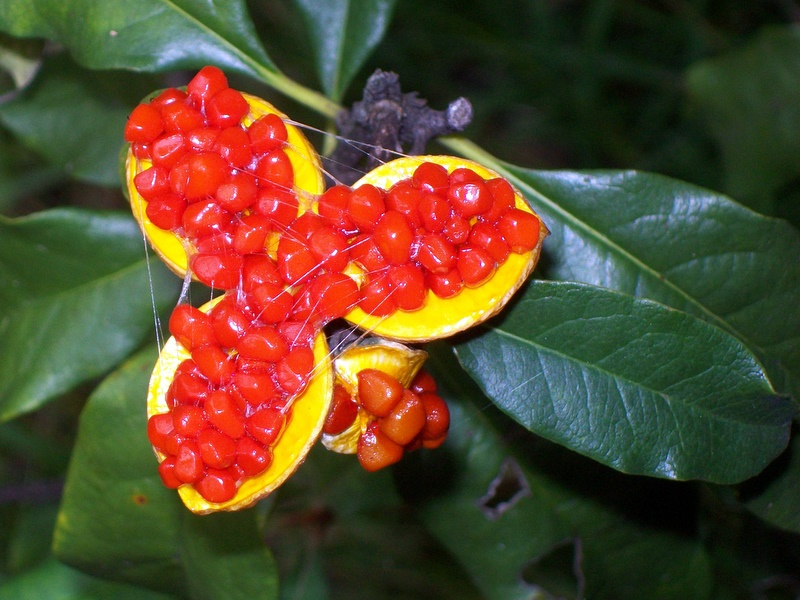
Opened fruiting capsule

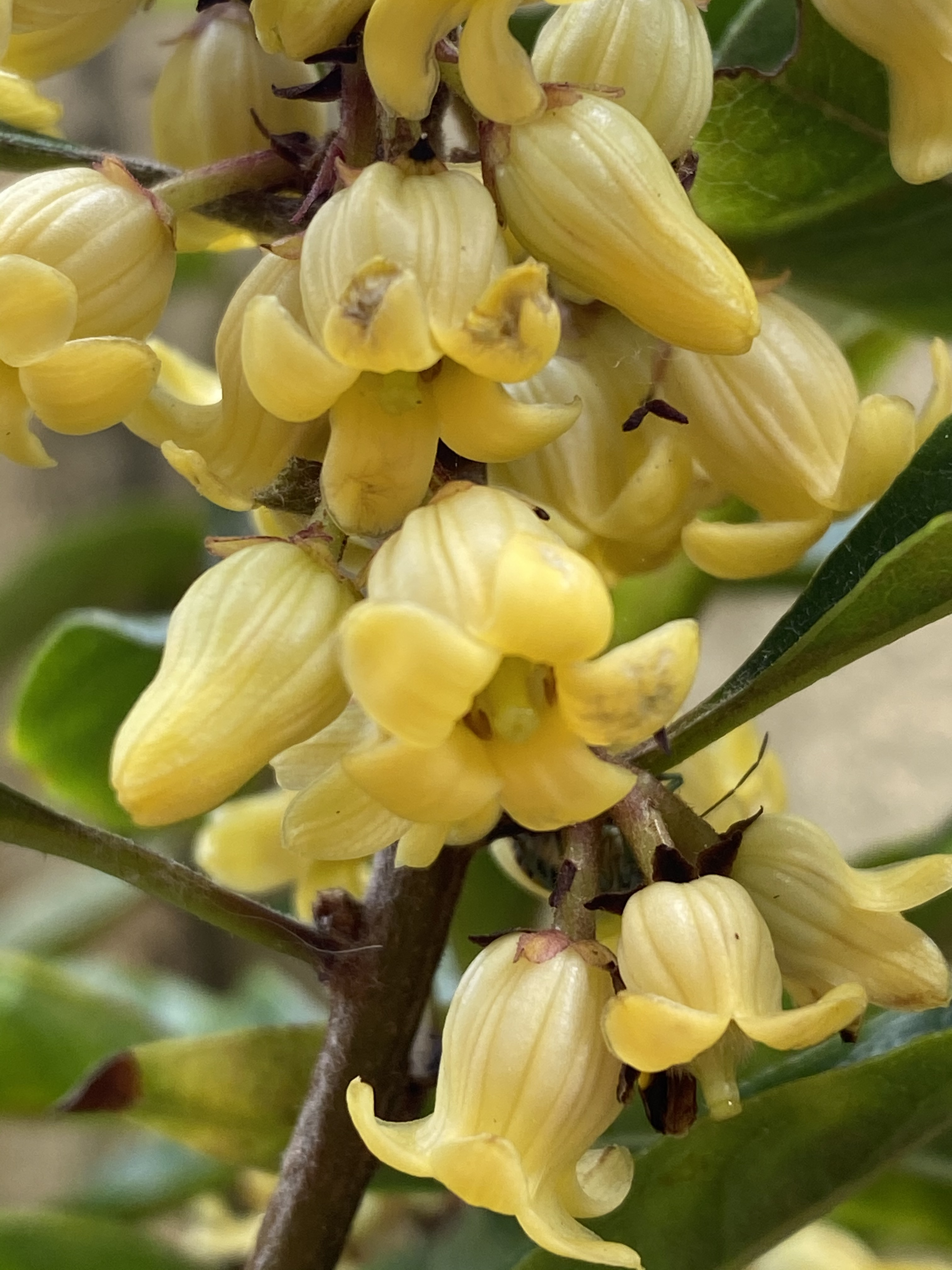
Flowers
