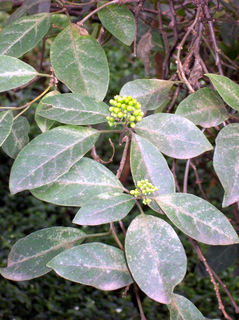
- At Denistone, NSW

Scientific classification
- Kingdom: Plantae
- Clade: Tracheophytes
- Clade: Angiosperms
- Clade: Eudicots
- Clade: Asterids
- Order: Lamiales
- Family: Lamiaceae
- Genus: Clerodendrum
- Species: C. tomentosum

Binomial name
- Clerodendrum tomentosum Vent. & R.Br.

= Clerodendrum tomentosum =

Downy chance

Species of tree

Clerodendrum tomentosum, known as the downy chance, hairy lolly bush, hairy clairy or hairy clerodendrum is a shrub or small tree occurring in eastern and northern Australia. It is distributed from Batemans Bay (35° S) in southern coastal New South Wales, to Queensland, Northern Territory, Western Australia, and New Guinea.

The habitat of Clerodendrum tomentosum is the margins of warmer rainforests of various types. It can also survive in certain areas of under 1000 mm average annual rainfall.

== Name and taxonomy ==
The curious common name of 'downy chance' alludes to both the generic and species names. The generic name Clerodendrum was coined by the father of modern taxonomy, Carl Linnaeus. Clerodendrum is from the Greek κλῆρος (klêros) 'allotment' and δένδρον (déndron) 'tree', while tomentosum refers to downy or hairy leaves. Recent phylogenetic studies have shown that the genus Clerodendrum belongs in the mint family. Consequently, this species has been removed from the verbena family and placed in Lamiaceae.

== Description ==
Clerodendrum tomentosum grows up to 15 metres tall with a trunk diameter of 25 cm, though usually much smaller. It is an open branched plant with large veiny leaves.

The trunk is mostly cylindrical or sometimes flanged at the base. The bark is grey or fawn, and somewhat scaly or corky on larger plants. Young branchlets have lenticels, and are downy and soft. The branchlets are angled or square in cross-section, brownish grey and sometimes purple at the tips.

The leaves are opposite on the stem, without serrations, 4 to 14 cm long, and 2 to 4.5 cm wide. With a short tip, the leaf form gradually tapers away at the base of the leaf. The upper leaf surface is sometimes hairy, while the undersurface is hairy, soft and downy to touch. The leaf is pale green below and darker above. Leaf veins are prominent on the underside, and visible on the top surface. There are 5 or 6 main lateral veins, curving near the leaf edge.

White flowers form in dense heads from October to January. They occur as cymes forming terminal corymbs. Four long stamens protrude from the fragrant flower.

The fruit is a black shiny or navy blue drupe with four lobes. It is surrounded by a fleshy red calyx. The red and black of the fruiting body attracts birds such as the satin bowerbird. Drupe size is 5 to 8 mm, and the width of the red calyx is up to 20 mm. Flowers are pollinated by nocturnal moths. The fruit is not edible for humans.

C. tomentosum is slow to regenerate from seed, though it can strike from cuttings.

== Uses ==
The attractive flowers and fruit make this suitable to native gardens in Australia. It is a bird and butterfly attracting plant. It is also used as a pioneer species in regeneration areas.

== Gallery ==
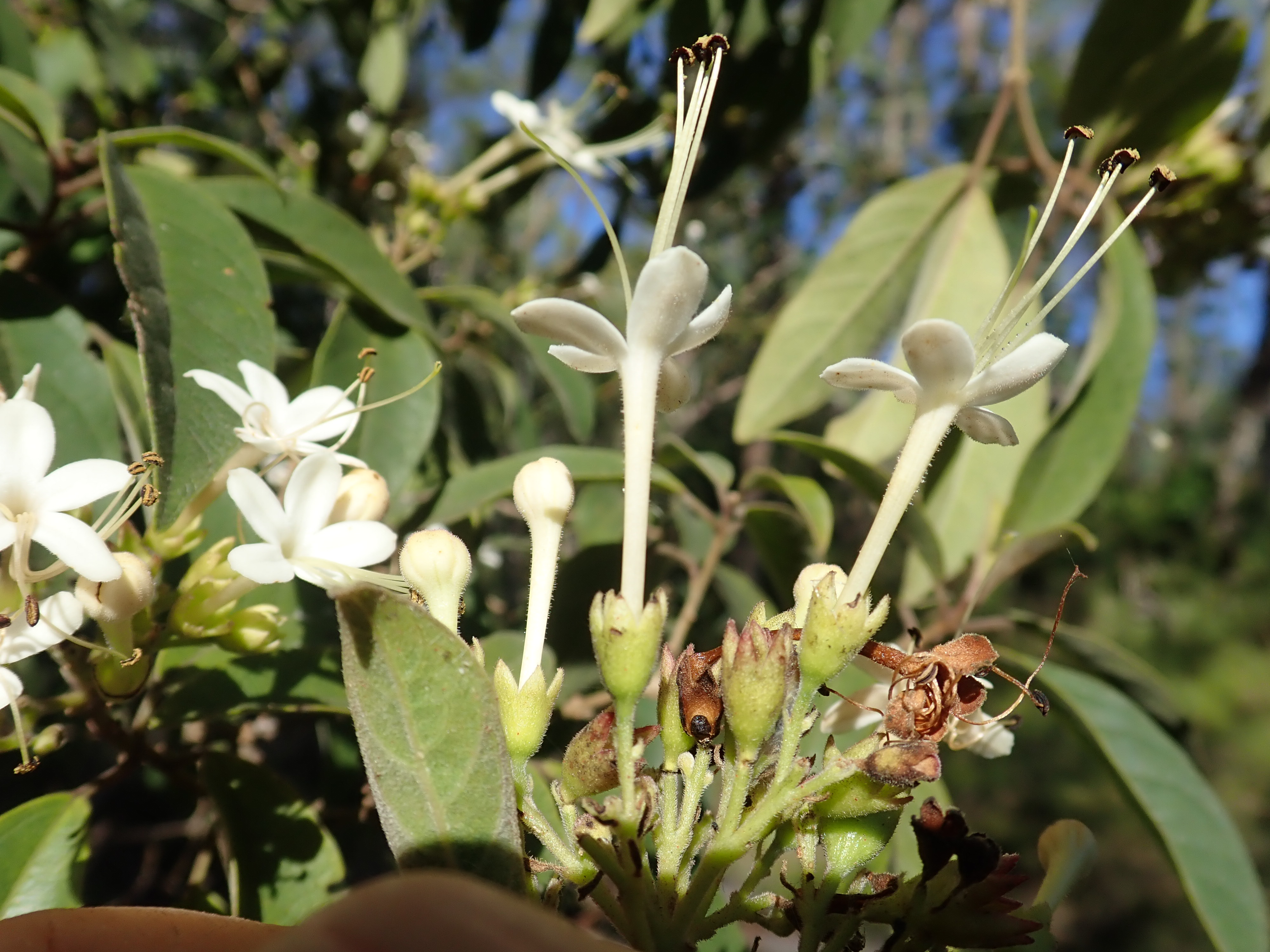
Flowers

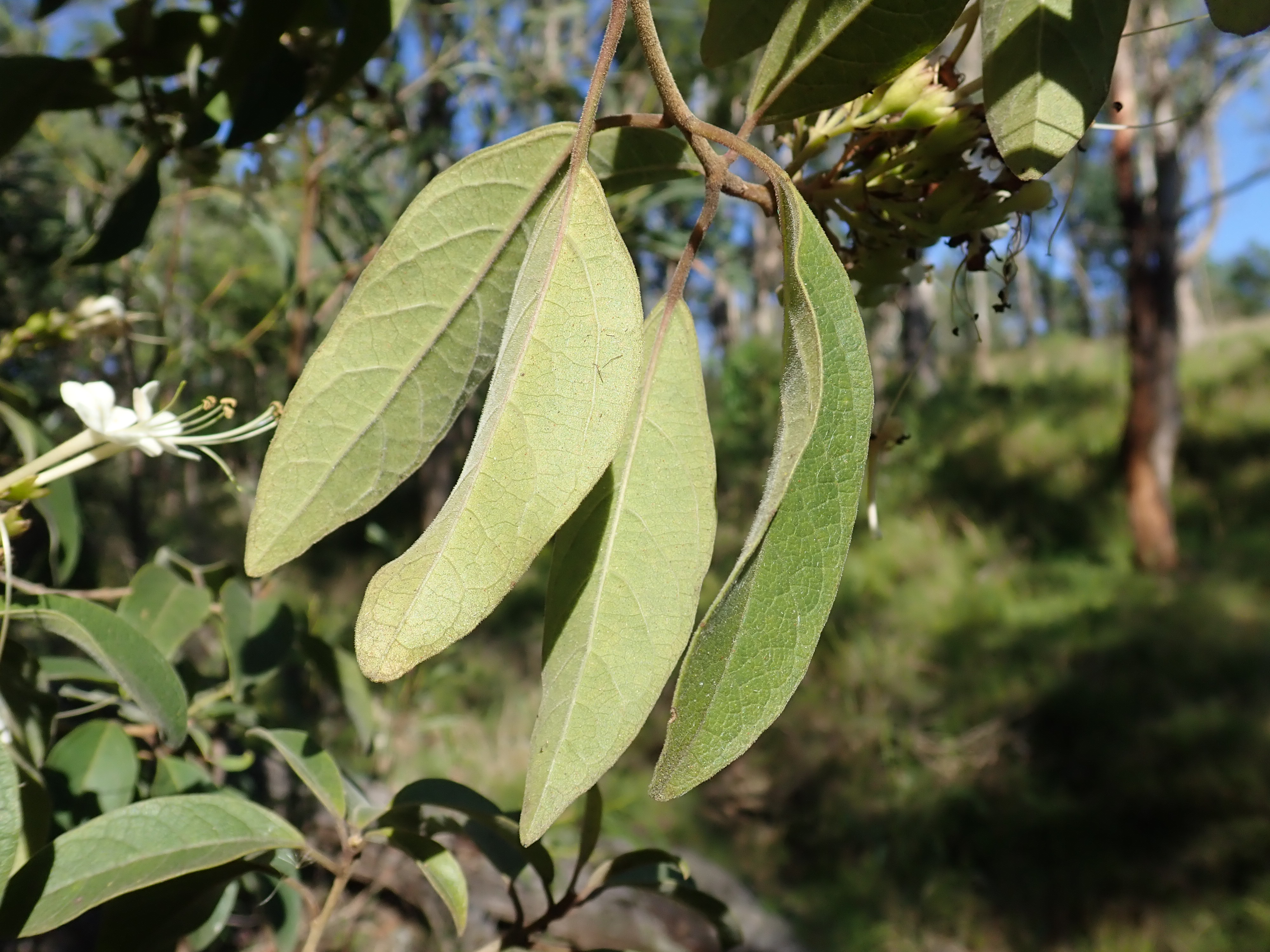
Leaves

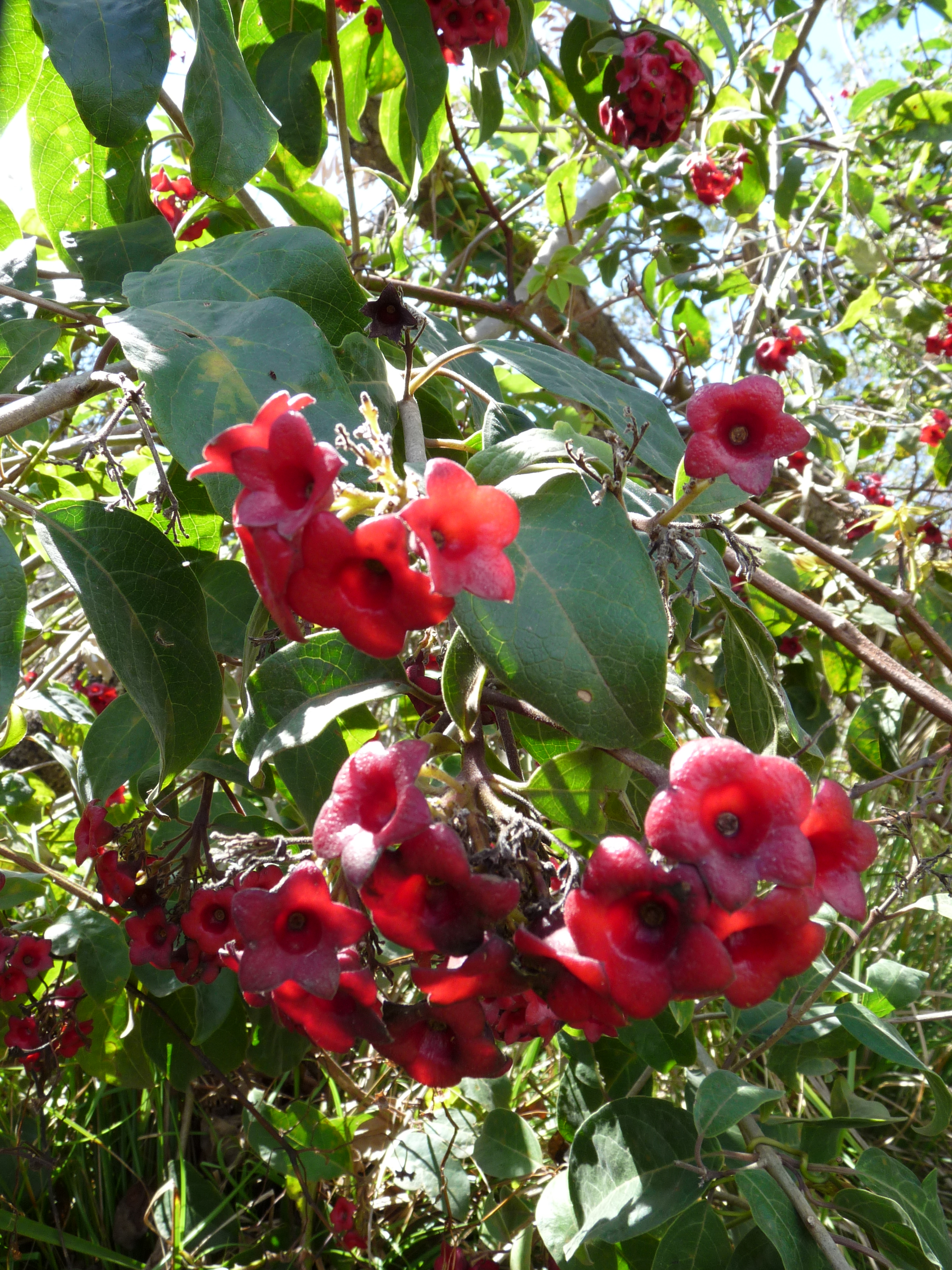
Downy chance with fleshy red calyces
