= Blue Gum High Forest =

Forest in Sydney, Australia

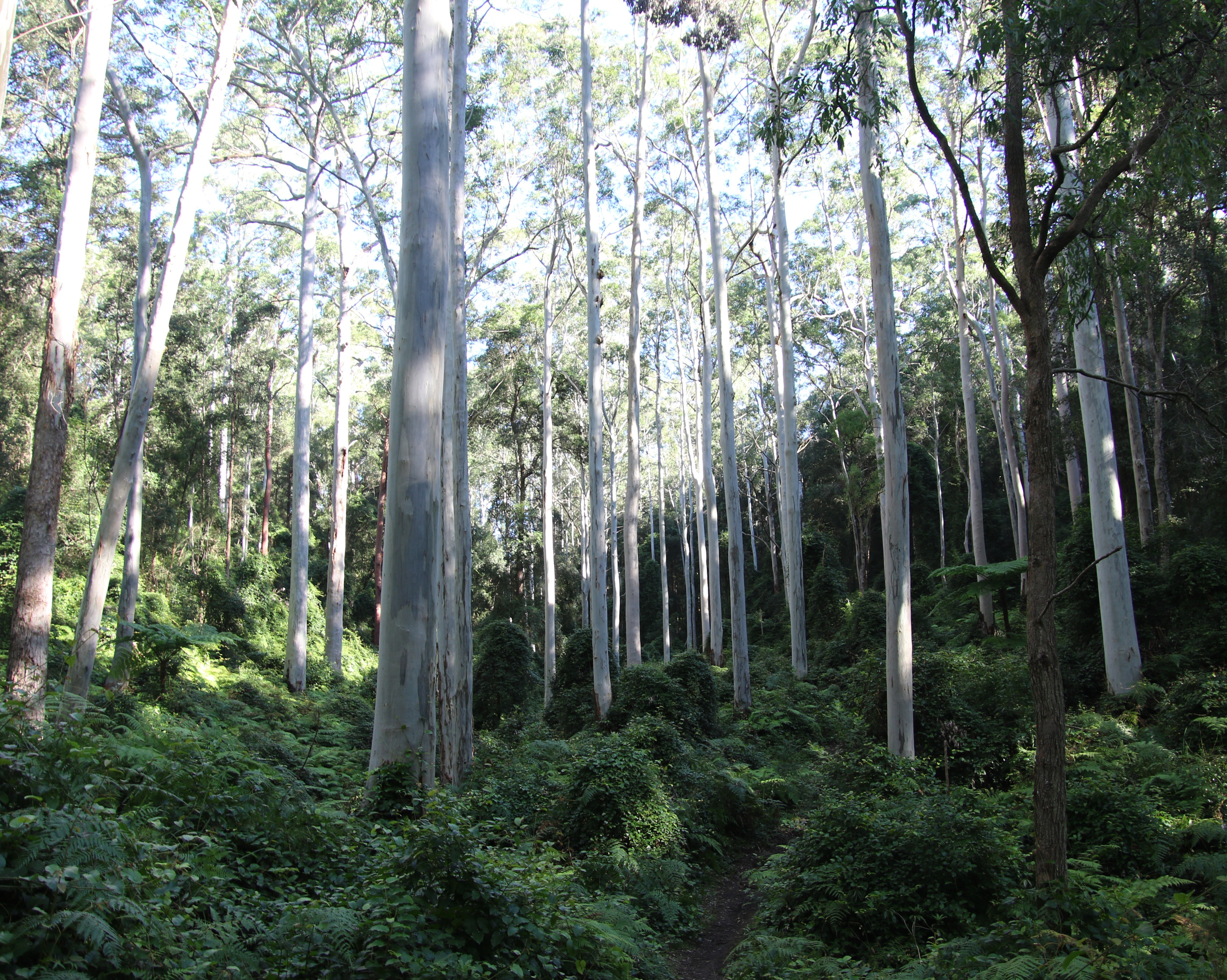

Ecology
- Realm: Australasia
- Biome: Temperate broadleaf and mixed forests
- Borders: Cumberland Plain Woodland; Sydney Turpentine-Ironbark Forest; Sydney Sandstone Ridgetop Woodland

Geography
- Country: Australia
- Elevation: 70–180 metres (230–590 ft)
- Coordinates: 33°44′12″S 151°9′15″E
- Climate type: Humid subtropical climate (Cfa)

The Blue Gum High Forest of the Sydney Basin Bioregion is a wet sclerophyll forest found in the northern parts of Sydney, New South Wales, Australia. It has been classified as critically endangered, under the New South Wales government's Threatened Species Conservation Act 1995. The principal canopy trees in this forest community are Sydney blue gum and blackbutt which are usually seen between 20 and 40 metres tall. 180 species of indigenous plants have been identified at Dalrymple-Hay Nature Reserve.

== Distribution ==
The Blue Gum High Forest is restricted to the northern parts of Sydney, on soils based on shale with an annual rainfall over 1100 mm (43 in). Much of it grew on the ridge tops, roughly following the present day Pacific Highway from around Crows Nest up to Hornsby. Also it was recorded on soils based on the Mittagong Formation, volcanic diatremes and exposed shale lenses within the Hawkesbury Sandstone. Blue Gum High Forest grades into Turpentine-Ironbark Forest in drier areas of lower rainfall.

Remnants are found as far west as West Pennant Hills and Eastwood, though most of the few remaining areas are in suburbs such as Pymble, Turramurra and Wahroonga. Turiban Reserve in Wahroonga has particularly tall trees. Two of the larger forest remnants are Dalrymple-Hay Nature Reserve and Sheldon Forest. Around 4.5 percent of the original forest remains, and the current remnants amount to an area of 136 hectares (336 acres).

== Ecological status ==
Due to fragmentation and the surrounding urban area, the forest remnants are constantly under threat from invasive plant species. Bush regeneration programs have been put in place for many years. Significant species include Wandering Jew, Madeira vine, passionfruit vine, Chinese privet, ochna and camphor laurel.

== Fauna ==
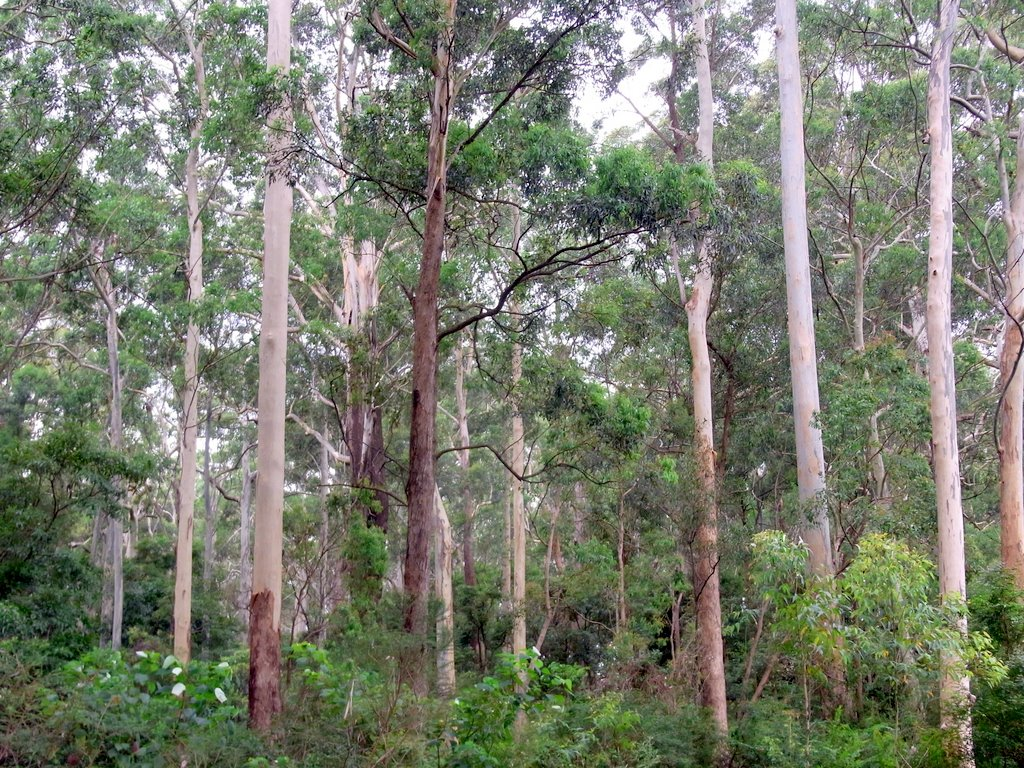
Sheldon Forest

Ring-tail possums, sugar gliders, brushtail possums and grey-headed flying foxes are common. There are occasional sightings of wallabies.

Birds include rainbow lorikeet (Trichoglossus moluccanus), Australian king parrot (Alisterus scapularis), crimson rosella (Platycercus elegans), currawongs, variegated fairywren (Malurus lamberti), black-faced cuckoo-shrike (Coracina novaehollandiae), superb fairywren (Malurus cyaneus), powerful owl (Ninox strenua), glossy black cockatoo (Calyptorhynchus lathami) and silvereyes.

The yellow-bellied sheathtail-bat (Saccolaimus flaviventris) is present though seldom seen.

== Flora ==
Selected plant species of Sydney Blue Gum High Forest
Common name	Botanical name	Approx. height	Plantnet
Principal tree species
Sydney blue gum	Eucalyptus saligna	20–40 metres	details
Blackbutt	Eucalyptus pilularis	25–45 metres	details
Associated tree species
Sydney red gum	Angophora costata	15–35 metres	details
Grey gum	Eucalyptus punctata	20–30 metres	details
White mahogany	Eucalyptus acmenoides	20–30 metres	details
Red mahogany	Eucalyptus resinifera	20–30 metres	details
Turpentine	Syncarpia glomulifera	20–30 metres	details
Grey ironbark	Eucalyptus paniculata	20–35 metres	details
White stringybark	Eucalyptus globoidea	15–30 metres	details
Understorey tree species
Forest oak	Allocasuarina torulosa	6–15 metres	details
Sweet pittosporum	Pittosporum undulatum	to 15 metres	details
Blueberry ash	Elaeocarpus reticulatus	to 15 metres	details
Hickory	Acacia implexa	to 10 metres	details
Lilly Pilly	Acmena smithii	to 10 metres	details
Shrub species
Hairy clerodendrum	Clerodendrum tomentosum	to 10 metres	details
Coffee bush	Breynia oblongifolia	to 3 metres	details
Sydney golden wattle	Acacia longifolia	to 8 metres	details
Myrtle wattle	Acacia myrtifolia	0.3–3 metres	details
Bleeding heart	Homalanthus populifolius	0.5–5 metres	details
Sweet bursaria	Bursaria spinosa	to 10 metres	details
Gorse bitter-pea	Daviesia ulicifolia	to 2 metres	details
Mock olive	Notelaea venosa	to 9 metres	details
Common hop bush	Dodonaea triquetra	to 3 metres	details
Cherry ballart	Exocarpos cupressiformis	to 8 metres	details
Variable muttonwood	Myrsine variabilis	to 8 metres	details
Yellow pittosporum	Pittosporum revolutum	to 3 metres	details
Muttonwood	Myrsine howittiana	to 8 metres	details
Narrow-leaved orangebark	Denhamia silvestris	to 4 metres	details
Australian indigo	Indigofera australis	to 2.5 metres	details
Tick bush	Kunzea ambigua	to 3.5 metres	details
Herbs, grasses and ferns
Tussock grass	Poa affinis		details
False bracken	Calochlaena dubia		details
Maidenhair fern	Adiantum aethiopicum		details
Gristle fern	Blechnum cartilagineum		details
Sickle fern	Pellaea falcata		details
Pixie Caps	Acianthus fornicatus		details
Kidney weed	Dichondra repens		details
Lilac lily	Schelhammera undulata		details
Ivy Goodenia	Goodenia hederacea		details
Blady grass	Imperata cylindrica		details
Vines
Australian Clematis	Clematis aristata		details
Wombat berry	Eustrephus latifolius		details
Bearded tylophora	Vincetoxicum barbatum (syn. Tylophora barbata)		details
Scented milk vine	Leichhardtia suaveolens (syn. Marsdenia suaveolens)		details
Dusky coral pea	Kennedia rubicunda		details
Five leaf water vine	Cissus hypoglauca		details
Twining Glycine	Glycine clandestina		details
Wonga wonga vine	Pandorea pandorana		details
Other species
Doodia aspera; Echinopogon caespitosus; Entolasia marginata; Entolasia stricta; Glochidion ferdinandi; Goodenia heterophylla; Lagenophora gracilis; Lepidosperma laterale; Leucopogon juniperinus; Lomandra longifolia; Microlaena stipoides; Oplismenus aemulus; Oxalis exilis; Ozothamnus diosmifolius; Panicum simile; Polyscias sambucifolia; Pomax umbellata; Poranthera microphylla; Pratia purpurascens; Pseuderanthemum variabile; Rubus parvifolius; Smilax glyciphylla; Stipa pubescens; Veronica plebeia; Zieria smithii

== See also ==
- List of threatened ecological communities declared by the Commonwealth of Australia
- Blue Mountains Shale Cap Forest
- Temperate Rainforests of New South Wales
