= Sydney Turpentine–Ironbark Forest =

Critically endangered forest in Australia

Coordinates: 33°47.666′S 151°8.126′E

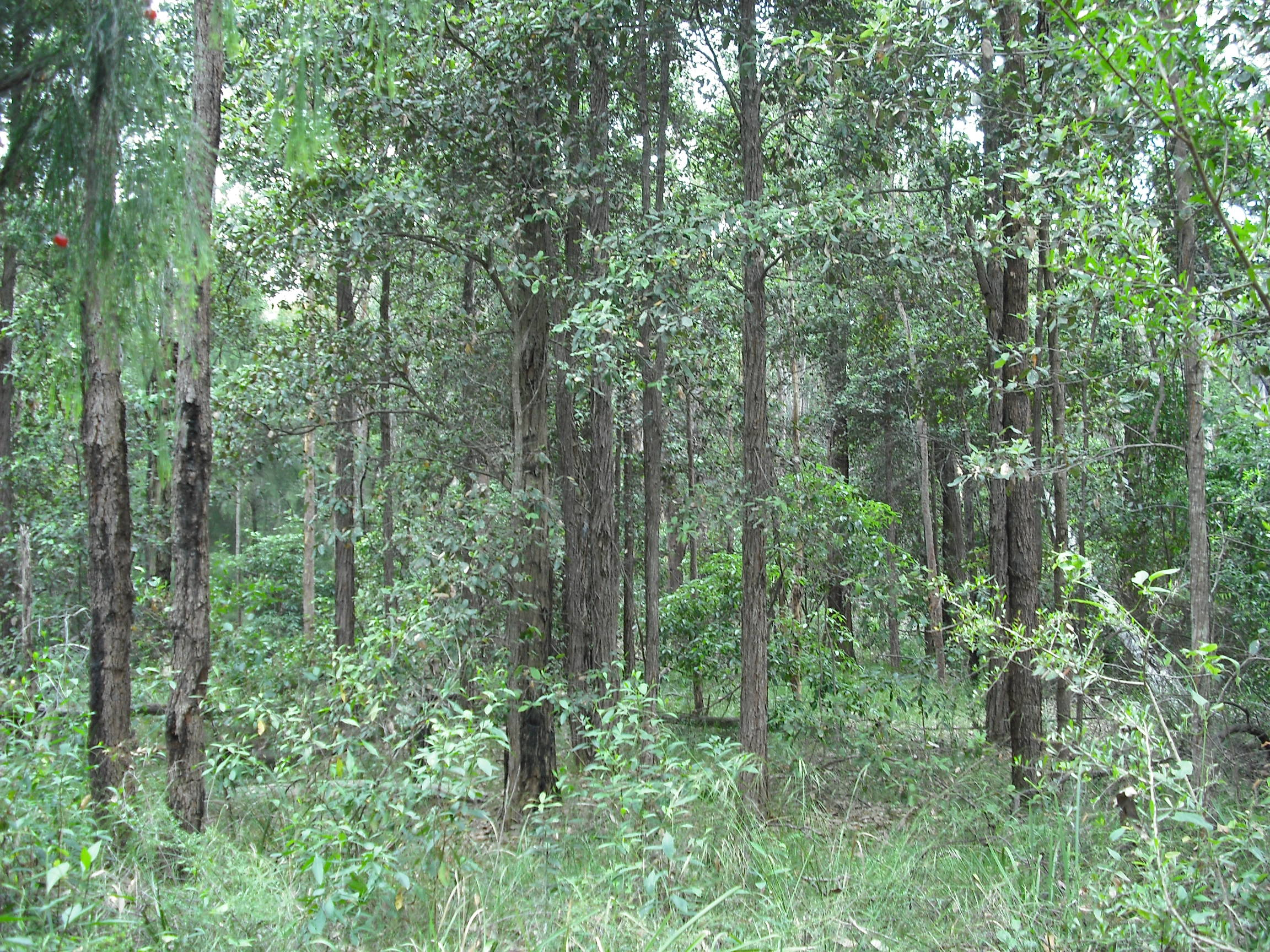
- Entrance to Wallumatta Nature Reserve, North Ryde

Ecology
- Realm: Australasia
- Biome: Temperate broadleaf and mixed forests
- Borders: Cumberland Plain Woodland; Blue Gum High Forest; Eastern Suburbs Banksia Scrub; Sydney Sandstone Ridgetop Woodland

Geography
- Country: Australia
- Elevation: 30–120 metres (98–394 ft)
- Geology: Sandstone, shale, laminite and siltstone
- Climate type: Humid subtropical climate (Cfa)

The Sydney Turpentine–Ironbark Forest (STIF) is a wet sclerophyll forest community of Sydney, New South Wales, Australia, that is typically found in the Inner West and Northern region of Sydney. It is also among the three of these plant communities which have been classified as Endangered, under the New South Wales government's Threatened Species Conservation Act 1995, with only around 0.5% of its original pre-settlement range remaining.

As of 26 August 2005, the Australian Government reclassified Sydney Turpentine–Ironbark Forest as a "Critically Endangered Ecological Community", under the Commonwealth's Environment Protection and Biodiversity Conservation Act 1999. The original extent of the forest was 26,516 ha, but now only 1,182 ha (or 4.5% of original extent) remains. It is a transitional biome between Cumberland Plain Woodland in the drier areas and Blue Gum High Forest on neighboring higher rainfall ridges.

== Characteristics ==
Sydney Turpentine–Ironbark Forest contains trees which are around 20–30 metres tall, with ground cover composed of flowering shrubs and native grasses. This type of forest prefers a fertile clay soil derived from shale, with undulating hills and moderate rainfall. Its range does not extend to drier Cumberland Plain Woodland, or high-rainfall ridges (where it meets with Blue Gum High Forest, also endangered), or areas with less fertile, sandy soil.

The main canopy trees in this forest community are turpentine (Syncarpia glomulifera, can grow over 30 metres high), and a number of different species of Ironbark, which vary depending on local environmental conditions. Grey ironbark (Eucalyptus paniculata), narrow-leaved ironbark (Eucalyptus crebra), red ironbark or broad-leaved ironbark (Eucalyptus fibrosa), and grey gum (Eucalyptus punctata) are commonly found species in the Cumberland Plain area. On the shale caps of the Hornsby plateau, grey ironbark and mountain mahogany (Eucalyptus notabilis) have been noted as being found in association with turpentine. At the upper end of its rainfall/elevation range, turpentine–ironbark forest may intermingle with Blue Gum High Forest and be dominated by blue gum (Eucalyptus saligna), mountain grey gum (Eucalyptus cypellocarpa), round-leaved gum (Eucalyptus deanei) or grey gum.

Understorey plants include wattles such as Parramatta green wattle (Acacia parramattensis) and Sydney golden wattle (Acacia longifolia), the common hop bush (Dodonaea triquetra), as well as native grasses, herbs and flowers such as kangaroo grass (Themeda australis) and Australian bluebell (Wahlenbergia gracilis).

Plant species growing in Sydney Turpentine–Ironbark Forest typically number upwards of 70, although fewer species are found in the smaller surviving pockets, and some may not be visible above ground, awaiting climatic conditions favourable for seed germination.

Plant species of Sydney Turpentine–Ironbark Forest
Common name	Botanical name	Approx. height	Plantnet
Principal Tree Species
Turpentine	Syncarpia glomulifera	30+ metres	details
grey ironbark	Eucalyptus paniculata	25–35 metres	details
Associated Tree Species
Grey box gum, or grey gum	Eucalyptus punctata	30–35 metres	details
Woollybutt	Eucalyptus longifolia	20–35 metres	details
White mahogany	Eucalyptus acmenoides	25–50 metres	details
Smooth-barked apple, Sydney red gum, or rusty gum	Angophora costata	15–30 metres	details
Thin-leaved stringybark	Eucalyptus eugenioides	15–30 metres	details
Broad-leaved, or red ironbark	Eucalyptus fibrosa	15–35 metres	details
White stringybark	Eucalyptus globoidea	15–30 metres	details
Understorey Tree Species
Parramatta (green) wattle, or Sydney green wattle	Acacia parramattensis	2–15 metres	details
Sicle wattle	Acacia falcata	2–5 metres	details
Forest oak	Allocasuarina torulosa	10–25 metres	details
White feather honey-myrtle	Melaleuca decora	to 7 metres	details
Shrub Species
Coffee bush	Breynia oblongifolia	to 3 metres	details
Sydney golden wattle	Acacia longifolia	to 8 metres	details
Myrtle wattle, or red-stemmed wattle	Acacia myrtifolia	0.3–3 metres	details
Sweet bursaria, blackthorn, or boxthorn	Bursaria spinosa	to 10 metres	details
Gorse bitter-pea	Daviesia ulicifolia	to 2 metres	details
Large mock olive, large-leaved olive	Notelaea longifolia	to 9 metres	details
Common hop bush, large-leaf hop bush	Dodonaea triquetra	to 3 metres	details
Cherry ballart, or native cherry	Exocarpos cupressiformis	to 8 metres	details
Elderberry panax (Myrsine variabilis)	Rapanea variabilis	-	details
Yellow pittosporum, wild yellow jasmine, rough fruit P.	Pittosporum revolutum	-	details
Muttonwood, (Myrsine howittiana)	Rapanea howittiana	-	details
Orange bark, narrow-leaved orangebark, orange bush	Denhamia silvestris	to 4.5 metres	details
Groundcover Species
Pale vanilla lily	Arthropodium milleflorum	-	details
Dumplings, apple berry, hairy apple berry	Billardiera scandens	to 0.5 metres	details
Blue trumpet, blue yam	Brunoniella australis	2 cm-15 cm	details
Swamp pennywort, Indian pennywort, gotu cola	Centella asiatica	-	details
Old man's beard, or headache vine	Clematis glycinoides	-	details
Sedge, slender flat-sedge	Cyperus gracilis	-	details
Blue flax lilly	Dianella caerulea	-	details
Rare plume grass	Dichelachne rara	to 1.2 metres	details
Love grass, or paddock lovegrass	Eragrostis leptostachya	to 1 metre	details
Love creeper	Glycine tabacina	-	details
Violet-leaved goodenia, forest goodenia, ivy goodenia	Goodenia hederacea	to 80 cm	details
Kangaroo grass	Themeda australis	to 1.2 metres	details
Australian bluebell, or sprawling bluebell	Wahlenbergia gracilis	5 cm-80 cm	details
Wallaby grass	Danthonia linkii	to 70 cm	details
Wallaby grass	Danthonia racemosa	-	details
Wallaby grass (Austrodanthonia tenuior)	Danthonia tenuior	to 1.1 metres	details
False sarsparilla, purple coral pea, waraburra	Hardenbergia violacea	-	details
Wonga vine	Pandorea pandorana	-	details
Slender Stackhousia	Stackhousia viminea	to 70 cm	details
Other Species
Acacia decurrens • Acacia implexa • Angophora floribunda • Aristida vagans • Cheilanthes sieberi • Clematis aristata Clerodendrum tomentosum • Commelina cyanea • Corymbia gummifera • Dichondra repens • Dodonaea triquetra • Echinopogon caespitosus Elaeocarpus reticulatus • Entolasia marginata • Entolasia stricta • Eucalyptus resinifera • Glycine clandestina • Goodenia hederacea Goodenia heterophylla • Imperata cylindrica • Indigofera australis • Kennedia rubicunda • Kunzea ambigua • Lepidosperma laterale Leucopogon juniperinus • Lomandra longifolia • Microlaena stipoides • Oplismenus aemulus • Oxalis exilis • Ozothamnus diosmifolius Panicum simile • Pittosporum undulatum • Poa affinis • Polyscias sambucifolia • Pomax umbellata • Poranthera microphylla Pratia purpurascens • Pseuderanthemum variabile • Rubus parvifolius • Smilax glyciphylla • Stipa pubescens • Vincetoxicum barbatum (syn. Tylophora barbata); Veronica plebeia • Zieria smithii
List sources: Ryde City Council and NSW National Parks & Wildlife Service.

== Distribution ==
The natural distribution of Sydney Turpentine–Ironbark Forest is limited to the Sydney Region, and occurs in areas with deep clay soils derived from Wianamatta shale, or shale layers within Hawkesbury sandstone. Occurring on plateaus and hillsides and on the margins of shale cappings over sandstone, it mainly survives today in the local government area of the City of Ryde, where it was probably once the predominant forest type in the area.

STIF grew in clay soils overlaying the sandstone of the Hornsby plateau, as well as in Sydney’s inner-west where the annual rainfall is between 900 and 1,000mm. Because the land favoured by Sydney Turpentine–Ironbark Forest plant species is very fertile (more so than the sandy soils derived from Hawkesbury sandstone), after British settlement much of the land was cleared for its timber, as well as for subsequent farming activity. Much of this forest type's area of distribution is now occupied by suburban dwellings.

Very few remnants of Sydney Turpentine–Ironbark Forest still exist. The most substantial undisturbed area is the Wallumatta Nature Reserve on the corner of Twin and Cressy roads North Ryde, which is owned and managed by the National Parks and Wildlife Service. Progressively smaller remnants can be found in Stewart Park, Marsfield (at the intersection of Epping and Vimiera roads), in the grounds of Macquarie University, and at Meadowbank Park, Meadowbank. Another known remnant of significance surviving in Australia is the Newington Forest near Sydney Olympic Park at Homebush. In the early 1990s, the Concord Local Council initiated a regeneration project to restore STIF bushland within the 3.5-hectare Queen Elizabeth II Park, bordered by Gipps, Broughton and Crane streets, and Addison Avenue, Concord. The project is continuing and expanding under the care of the new Canada Bay City Council and the Concord Bushcare Group. While Queen Elizabeth II Park contains a mixture of Sydney Turpentine–Ironbark Forest and non-indigenous species, there is other Sydney Turpentine–Ironbark Forest bushland in the City of Canada Bay area, located on the Department of Health estate surrounding Concord Hospital at Concord West. Located to the south of the main hospital, a relatively intact area of Sydney Turpentine–Ironbark Forest species may be found in the Dame Eadith Walker Reserve at the Yaralla Estate (private grounds of the Dame Edith Walker Hospital).

Outside these few remaining areas, scattered fragments of Sydney Turpentine–Ironbark Forest have been identified in the local government areas of Ashfield, Auburn, Canterbury, Concord, Drummoyne, Leichhardt, Marrickville, Bankstown, Ryde (Darvall Park and Brush Farm Park), Hunters Hill, Baulkham Hills, Ku-ring-gai (Sheldon Forest), Hornsby, Parramatta, Bankstown, Rockdale, Kogarah, Hurstville, and Sutherland. In heavily urbanised areas of the inner western suburbs, forest fragments can exist simply as an isolated tree belonging to a STIF species. The NSW Scientific Committee, an agency of the New South Wales Department of Environment and Climate Change, has noted the importance of identifying these scattered forest fragments in the interest of genetic diversity, as they "may be important sources of propagation material for use in rehabilitation projects."

Ryde City Council is aware of the near-extinction of this indigenous forest environment, and requires that if any tree becomes unsafe and requires removal, that a replacement must be chosen from the list of tree species indigenous to the particular area. The council's website also encourages local residents in appropriate areas to choose trees, shrubs and ground covers indigenous to the Sydney Turpentine–Ironbark Forest.

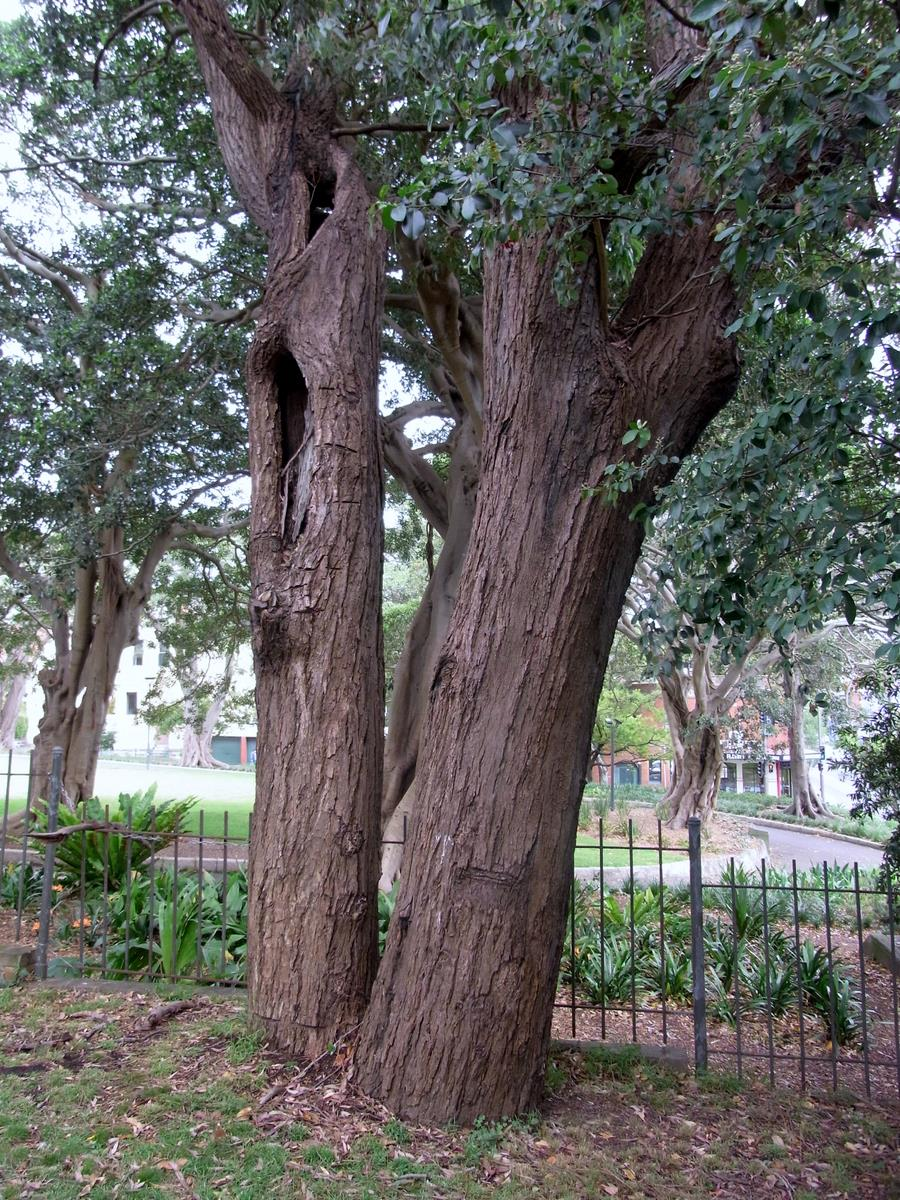
veteran Ironbark at Glebe, inner Sydney

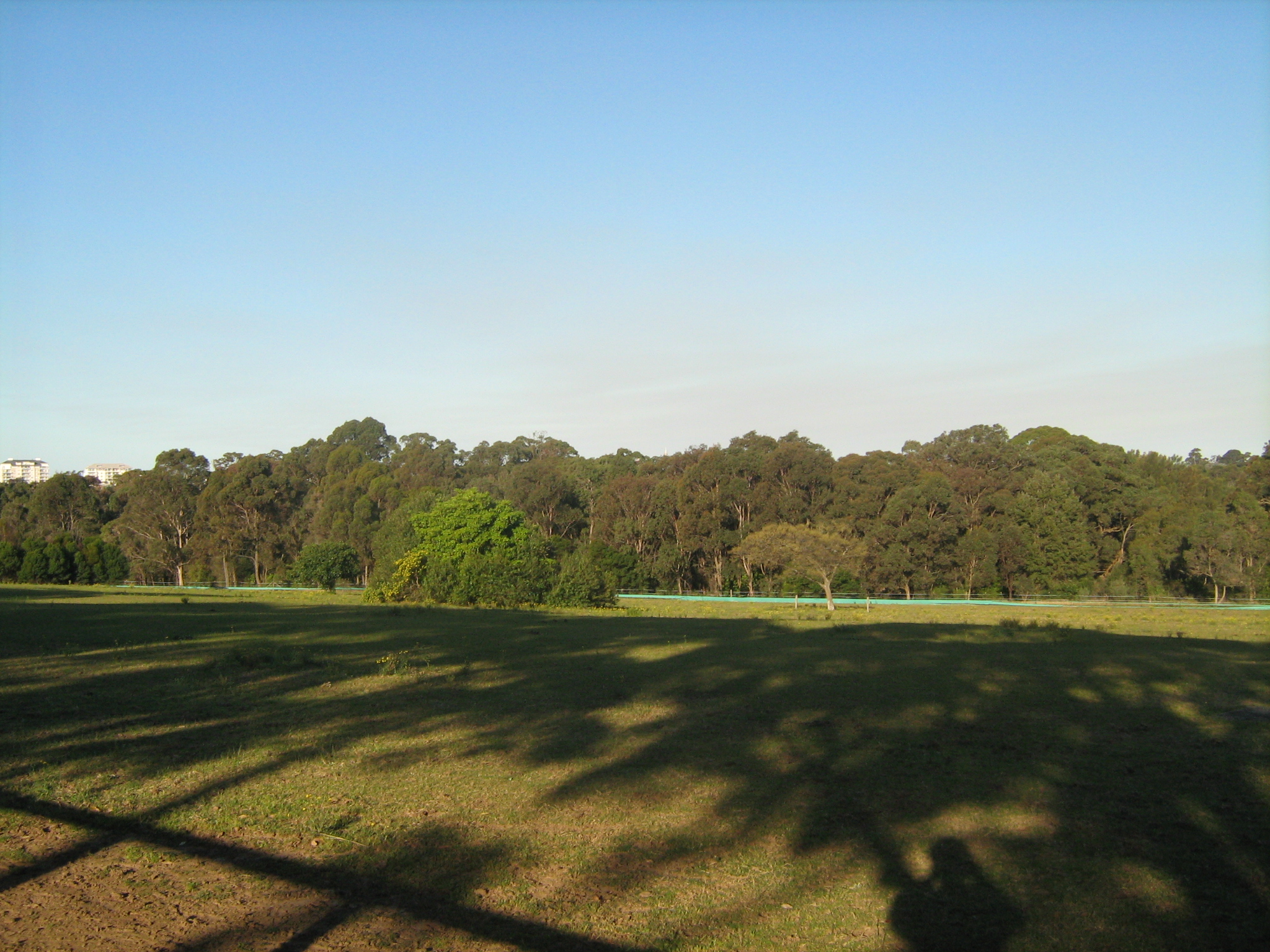
Sydney Turpentine–Ironbark Forest, Concord West, NSW.

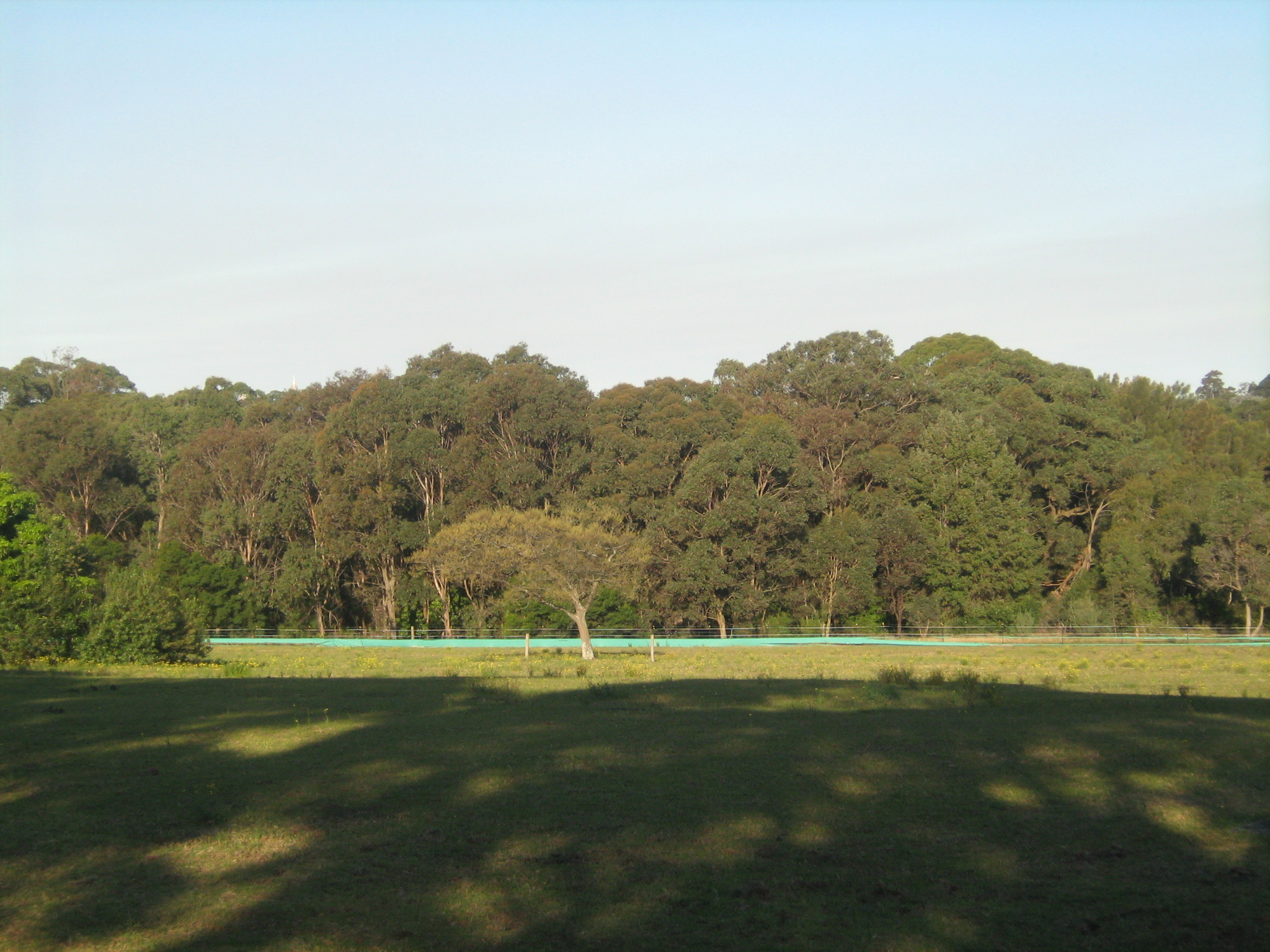

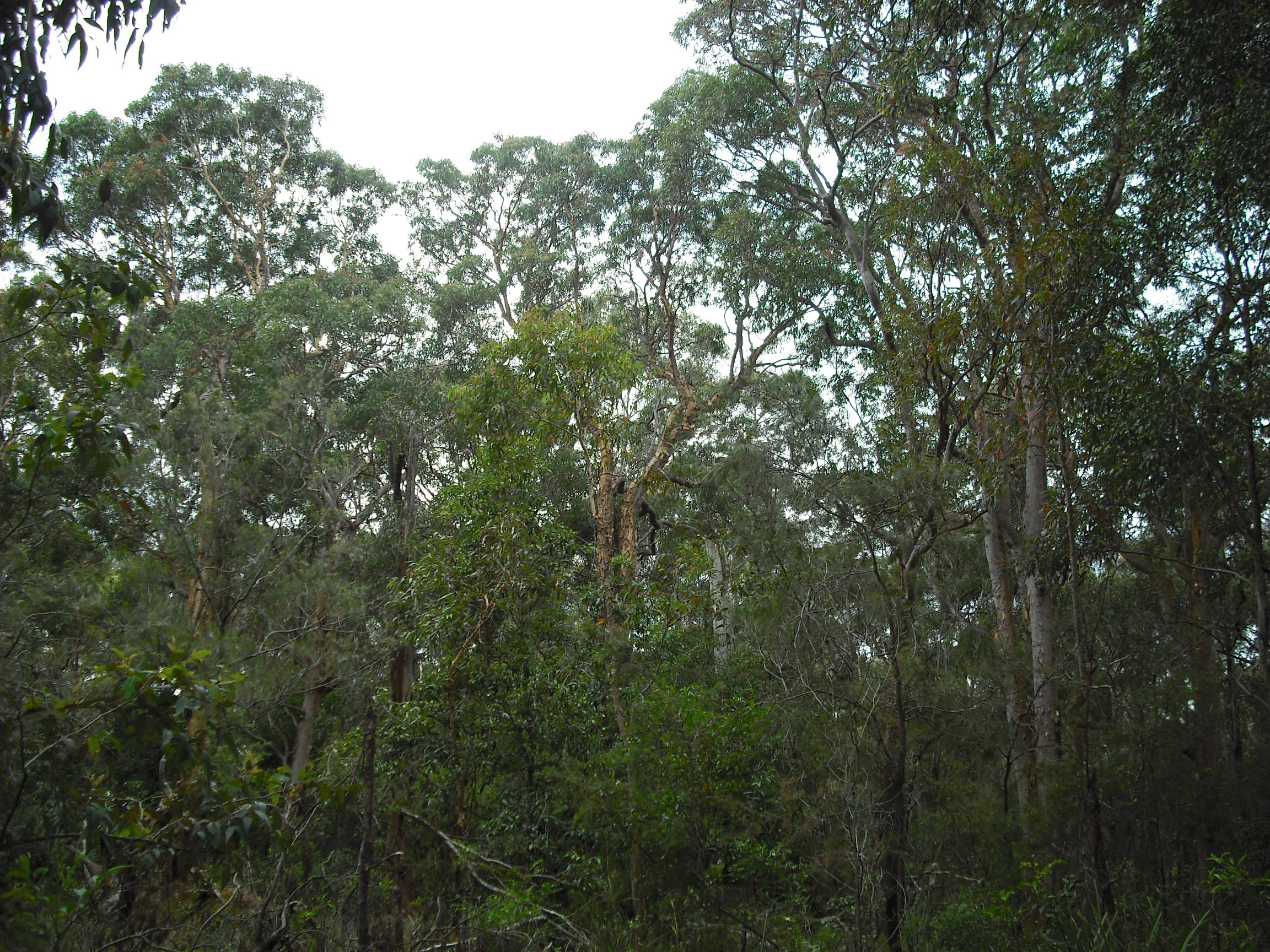
Tree canopy at Wallumatta Nature Reserve, North Ryde

== See also ==
- Protected areas of New South Wales
