= Dalrymple-Hay Nature Reserve =

Protected area in New South Wales, Australia

- IUCN category Ia (strict nature reserve)
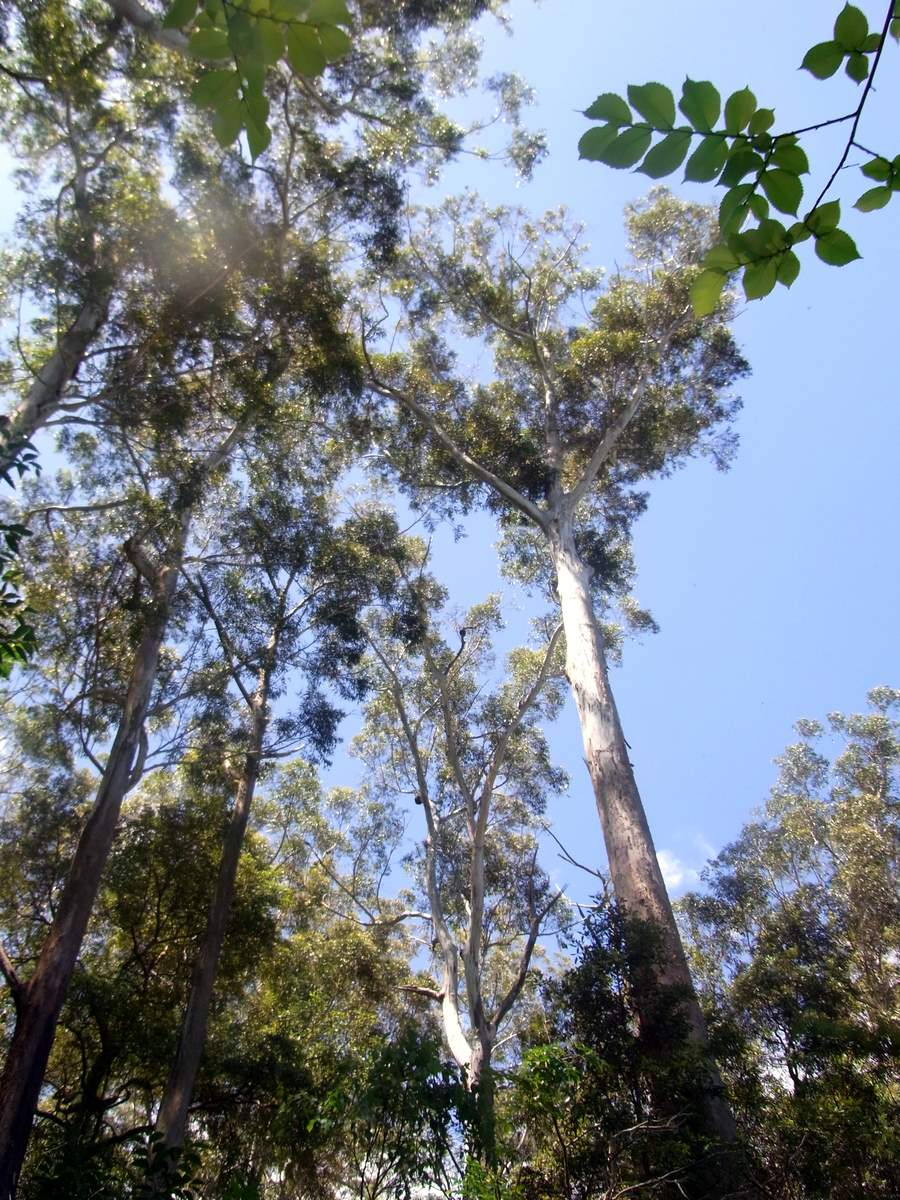
- Blackbutt at located in the reserve

- Location within New South Wales
- Location: New South Wales
- Nearest city: St Ives
- Coordinates: 33°44′12″S 151°9′15″E
- Area: 0.11 km^{2} (0.042 sq mi)
- Established: January 1972
- Governing body: NSW National Parks and Wildlife Service
- Website: www.environment.nsw.gov.au/NationalParks/parkHome.aspx?id=N0424

The Dalrymple-Hay Nature Reserve is a protected nature reserve in the northern suburbs of Sydney, New South Wales, Australia. The 10.768-hectare (26.61-acre) reserve is situated in the suburb of St Ives, 15 kilometres (9.3 mi) from the Sydney central business district.

The reserve is the most significant remnant of the eucalyptus Blue Gum High Forest which dominated much of the shale based forests north of Sydney. Only 1% of the original forest remains. The reserve is a traditional part of the Aboriginal country, which stretched from the northern shores of Sydney Harbour to Broken Bay in the north.

== Features ==
Average annual rainfall is high 1,400 millimetres (55 in).

Bush regeneration programs have been implemented for many years. Invasive weeds such as privet, large leave privet, trad, lantana and camphor laurel continue to be troublesome.

Richard Dalrymple-Hay, proposed that this forest area should be preserved, in the 1920s. The area was originally part of the hunting grounds of the Kuringgai people. Dalrymple-Hay Nature Reserve is listed on the Register of the National Estate.

=== Flora ===
180 native plants have been found in this reserve. Blackbutt is the dominant canopy species, other trees occurring include Sydney blue gum, grey ironbark, turpentine and rusty gum. Many of the blackbutt are in excess of 40 metres (130 ft) tall. Smaller plants include false bracken, orange bark, downy chance and muttonwood.

=== Fauna ===
Ringtail possums, sugar gliders, brushtail possums and grey-headed flying foxes are common. There are occasional sightings of wallabies. Birds such as rainbow lorikeets, Australian king parrots, crimson rosellas, currawongs, variegated wrens, black-faced cuckoo-shrikes, superb fairy wrens and silvereyes are some of the many birds found here.

== See also ==
- Protected areas of New South Wales
