= Clive Evatt Reserve and Turiban Reserve =

Forest remnants in Sydney, Australia

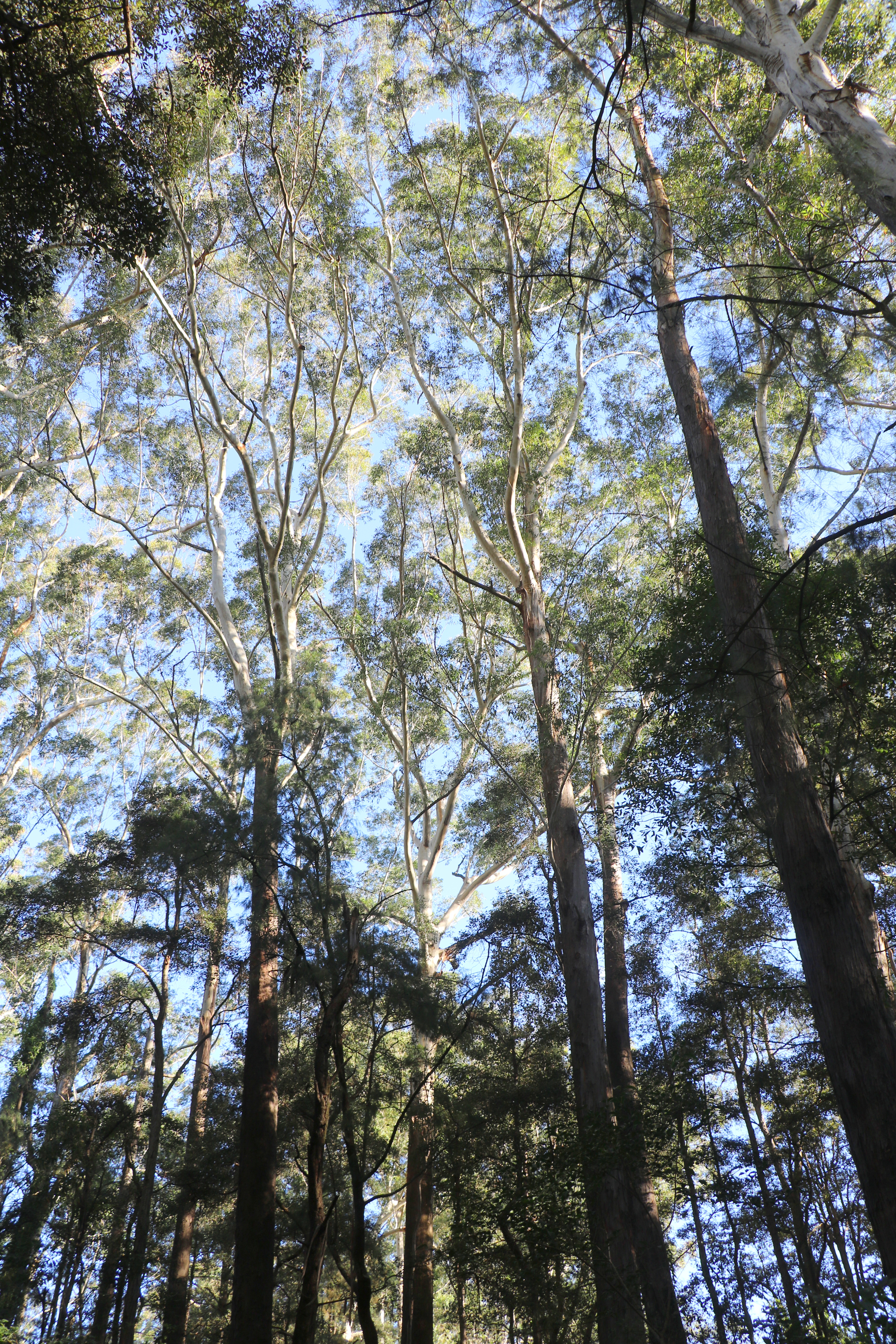
- Blackbutt at Turiban Reserve

- Location within New South Wales
- Location: New South Wales
- Nearest city: Wahroonga
- Coordinates: 33.715404°S 151.130368°E
- Governing body: Ku-ring-gai Municipal Council

Clive Evatt Reserve and Turiban Reserve are two forest remnants situated on Burns Road, Wahroonga, in Sydney, Australia. Both are of a high conservation status, being some of the last remnants of the critically endangered Blue Gum High Forest in the Sydney basin. Turiban has some of the tallest forest trees in Sydney, some blackbutt exceeding 45 metres tall. Forest restoration programs have been in progress for many years. The weeds ochna and privet being particularly troublesome. Foxes are an invasive mammal species. "Turiban" is said to be a clan of Indigenous Australians who lived north of Sydney.
