= Sheldon Forest =

Forest in New South Wales, Australia

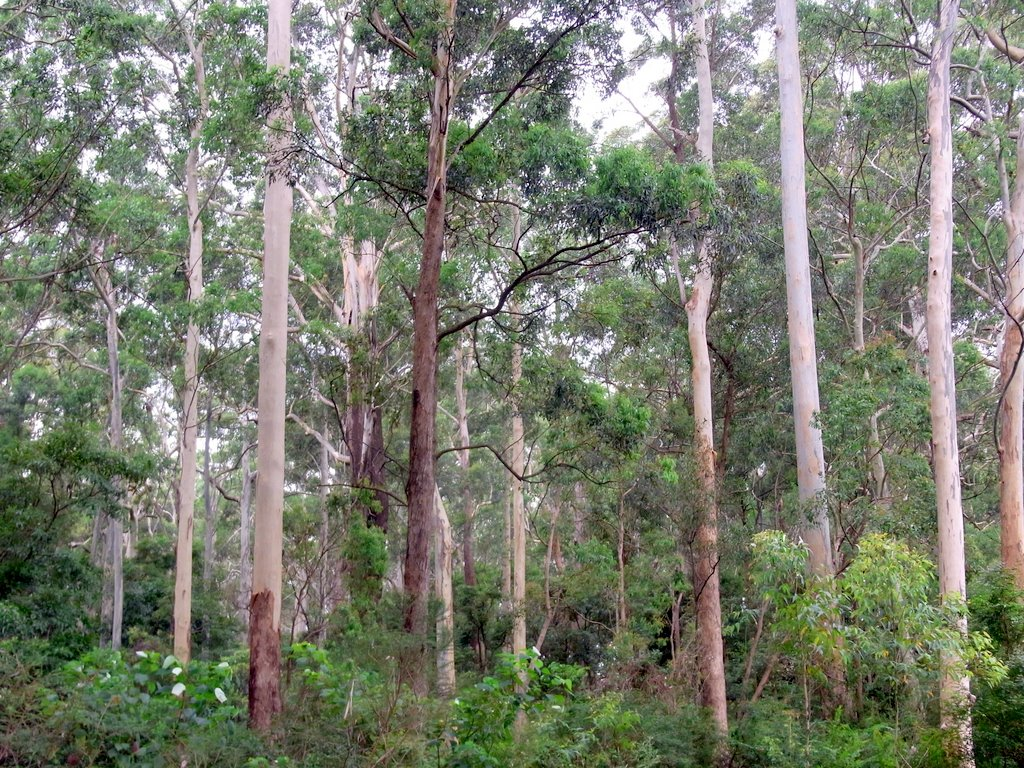
Sheldon Forest

Sheldon Forest is a pocket of urban bushland located 17 kilometres (11 mi) north-west of Sydney, Australia in a narrow valley between Turramurra and Pymble.

Sheldon Forest is of high conservation status because it contains some of the last remnants of the endangered Sydney Turpentine-Ironbark Forest (STIF) and Blue Gum High Forest (BGHF) in the Sydney basin.

Bush regeneration programs have been implemented for many years. Invasive weeds such as privet, large leave privet, wandering jew, lantana and camphor laurel continue to be troublesome.

The historic 1st Turramurra Scout hall is located at the entrance to the forest from Warragal Road. The hall has been continuously in this location for over 60 years.

== Walking Track ==
A walking track meanders through a range of plant communities. As you follow the track through the forest you will notice changes in the plant structure and associations. The change in plant associations occur because the underlying bedrock changes from shale to sandstone.

Three major communities will be obvious along your walk. The blue gum tall forest occurs on the ridge tops, while closed (or riparian) forest occurs along the creeks. On the hill slopes, sandstone supports an open forest-woodland community.

The track can be accessed from six locations:

- Warragal Road, Turramurra at the 1st Turramurra Scout hall
- Warragal Road, Turramurra at the end of the road
- Mimosa Oval, Turramurra
- Jubilee Avenue, Pymble
- Kimbarra Road, Pymble
- Troon Place, Pymble
