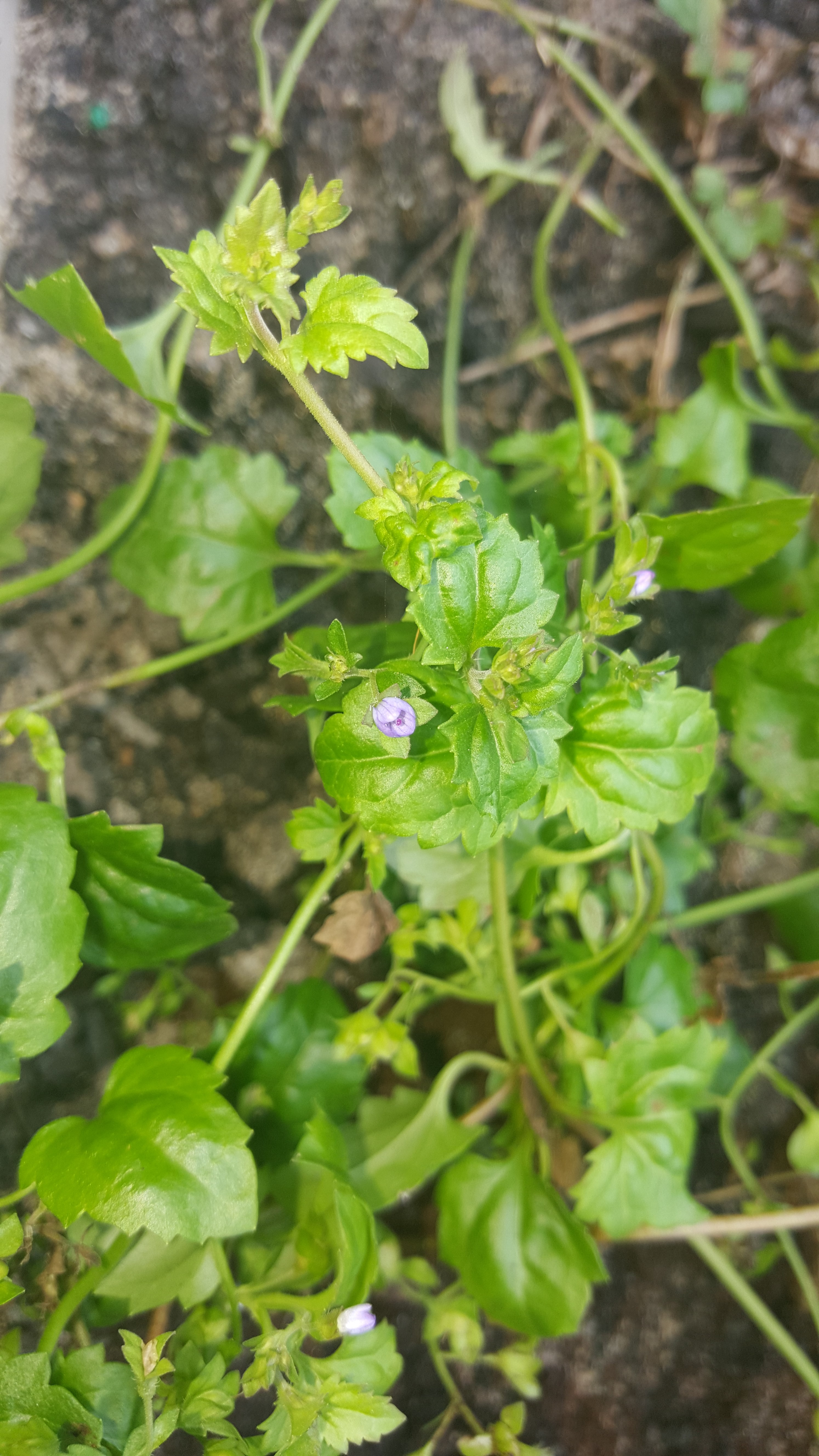

Scientific classification
- Kingdom: Plantae
- Clade: Tracheophytes
- Clade: Angiosperms
- Clade: Eudicots
- Clade: Asterids
- Order: Lamiales
- Family: Plantaginaceae
- Genus: Veronica
- Species: V. plebeia

Binomial name
- Veronica plebeia R.Br.

Synonyms
- Veronica deltoidea Spreng.

= Veronica plebeia =

Species of flowering plant in the plantain family

Veronica plebeia, commonly known as creeping- or trailing speedwell, is a species of flowering plant belonging to the family Plantaginaceae. It is native to Australia and New Zealand.

Robert Brown described the trailing speedwell in 1810 in his work Prodromus Florae Novae Hollandiae et Insulae Van Diemen. He had collected the species near Sydney in May 1802. A 2012 molecular study found it was most closely related to V. grosseserrata.

Veronica plebeia grows as a perennial herb, with stolons reaching 1 m (3 ft) in length. Roots appear at nodes along the stolons. The flowering stems can grow to 10 cm (4 in) tall. The leaves are roughly triangular or heart-shaped (cordate), measuring around 0.8–2 cm (0.3–0.6 in) long, and 0.5–1.6 cm (0.2–0.5 in) across. The lilac to pale blue flowers appear from September to June, with peak times between October and January, as well as April. They grow in clusters of 2 to 8.

Veronica plebeia is found in all Australian states and territories apart from the Northern Territory. It is widely distributed across eastern New South Wales. In Queensland it is found as far north as Tully and the Atherton Tableland. It is rare in Tasmania, restricted to the Tamar Valley and scattered locations on the east coast. It has been recorded from scattered coastal locations in the North Island as well as northwest Nelson in the South Island, and the Chatham Islands. There has been debate over whether it is native or naturalised, but it occurs in areas of little disturbance, suggesting the former. It has become naturalised in Norfolk Island.

It grows on clay soils over shale, in wet sclerophyll forest under such trees as Eucalyptus viminalis, E. fastigata, E. pilularis, in dry sclerophyll forest under Eucalyptus punctata, E. fibrosa, and open woodland under Angophora bakeri, Eucalyptus sclerophylla, Melaleuca decora, Eucalyptus moluccana and E. tereticornis.

The flowers are thought to be pollinated by native bees and flies.
