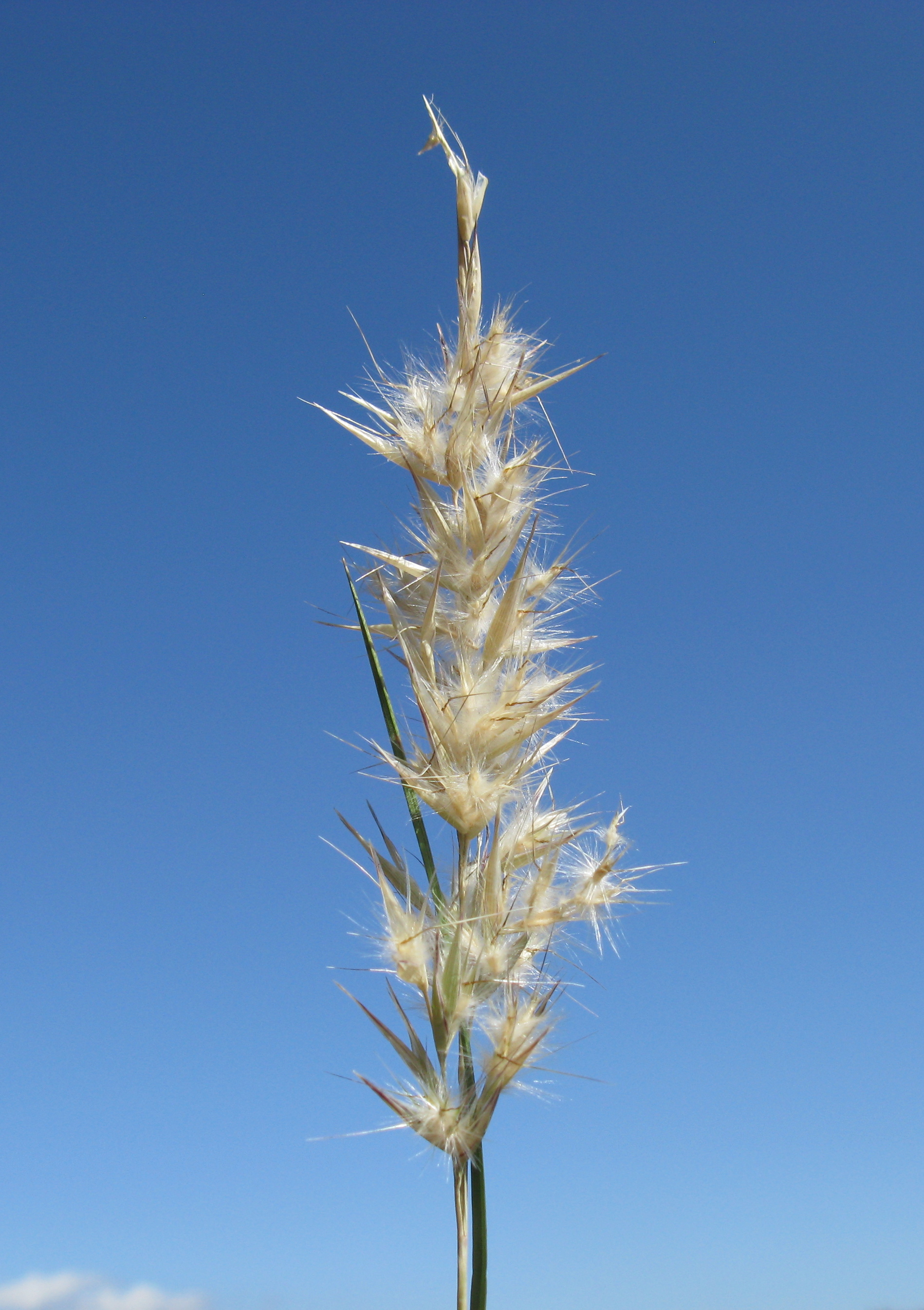

Scientific classification
- Kingdom: Plantae
- Clade: Tracheophytes
- Clade: Angiosperms
- Clade: Monocots
- Clade: Commelinids
- Order: Poales
- Family: Poaceae
- Genus: Rytidosperma
- Species: R. tenuius

Binomial name
- Rytidosperma tenuius (Steud.) Connor & Edgar

Synonyms
- Austrodanthonia tenuior (Steud.) H.P.Linder; Danthonia tenuior (Steud.) Conert; Danthonia purpurascens Vickery

= Rytidosperma tenuius =

Species of grass

Rytidosperma tenuius, or purplish wallaby grass, is an Australian species of wallaby grass found in south eastern Australia, usually on clay or sandy soils in the drier eucalyptus woodlands. The grass is perennial, and it may grow up to 1.2 m tall. It is native to the Australian states of Queensland, New South Wales, Victoria, South Australia and Tasmania, and it has been introduced to New Zealand. The inflorescences have a characteristic reddish colouration, and the attractive purplish bracts of young flowers can also aid in identification. The specific epithet tenuius is derived from the Latin for thin.

== Ecology ==
The rust fungus Uromyces danthoniae, a species found that grows parasitically on the leaves of several Rytidosperma species in New Zealand and Australia, infects Rytidosperma tenuius. It forms dense clusters of orange-brown aecidia on both surfaces of the leaf.
