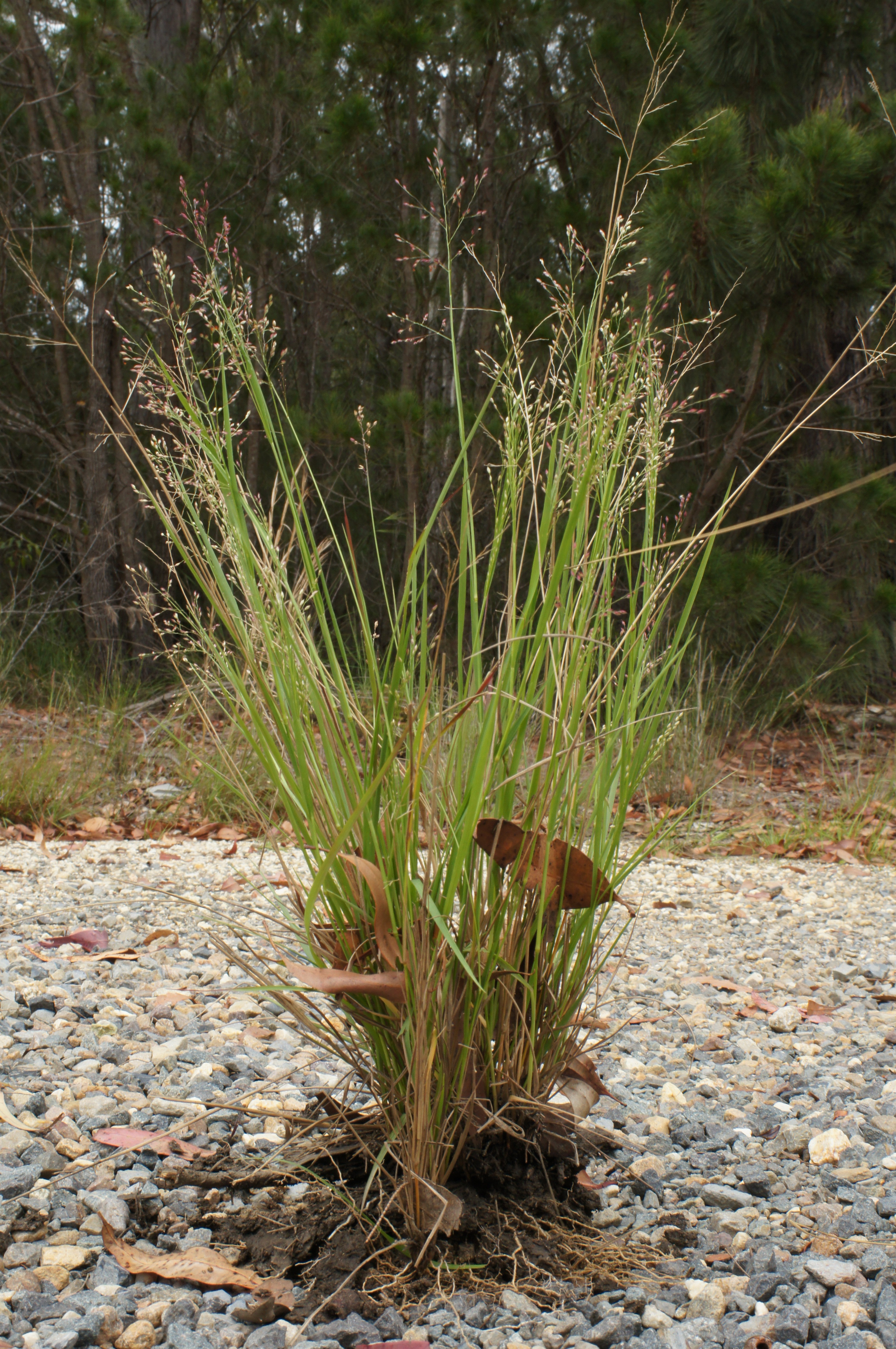

Scientific classification
- Kingdom: Plantae
- Clade: Tracheophytes
- Clade: Angiosperms
- Clade: Monocots
- Clade: Commelinids
- Order: Poales
- Family: Poaceae
- Subfamily: Panicoideae
- Genus: Panicum
- Species: P. simile

Binomial name
- Panicum simile Domin

= Panicum simile =

Two colour panic

Species of grass

Panicum simile, known by the common name two colour panic, is a species of grass found in eastern Australia. It was described by Karel Domin in 1915.
