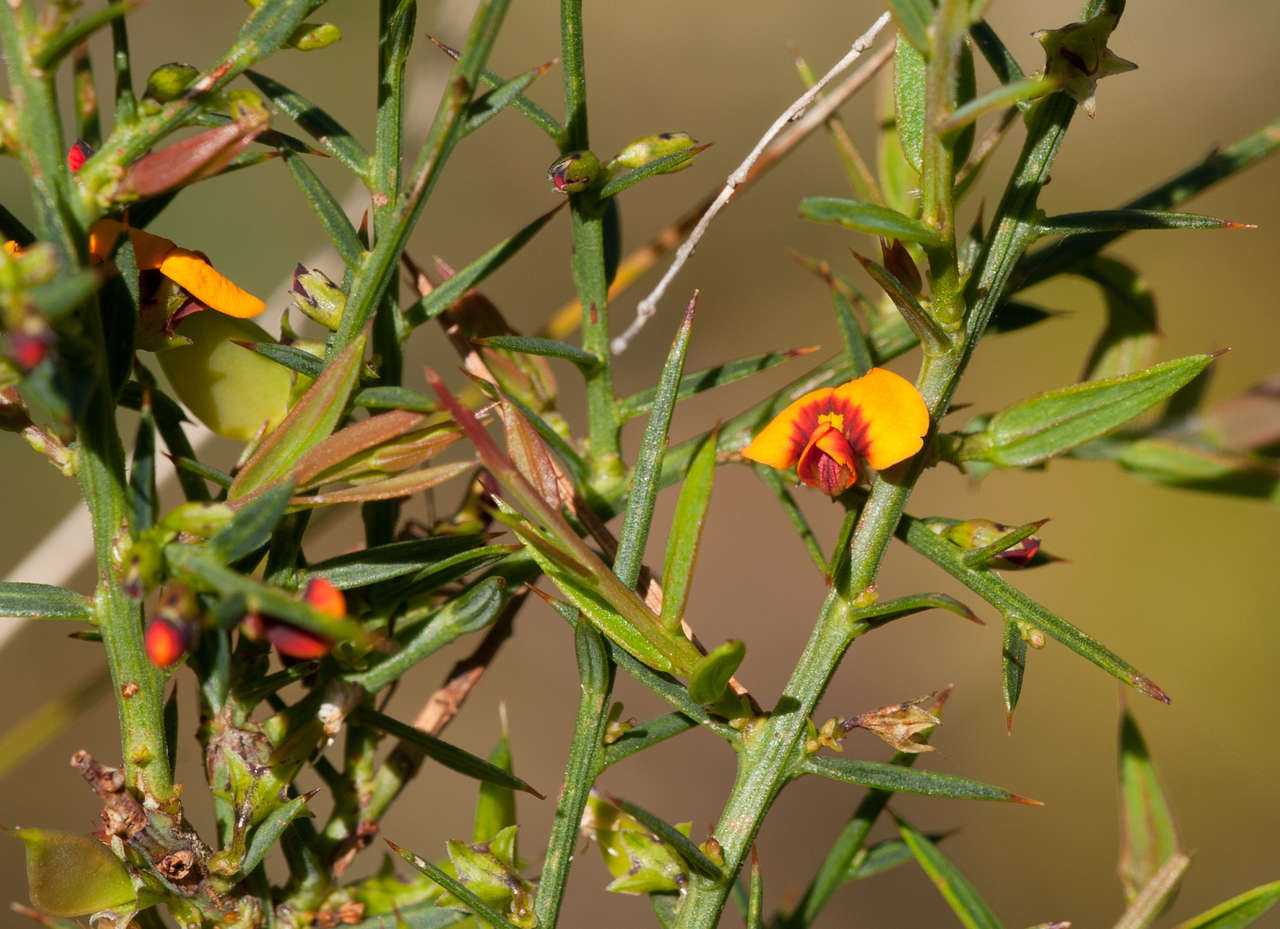
- Subspecies ulicifolia in Wilsons Promontory National Park

Scientific classification
- Kingdom: Plantae
- Clade: Tracheophytes
- Clade: Angiosperms
- Clade: Eudicots
- Clade: Rosids
- Order: Fabales
- Family: Fabaceae
- Subfamily: Faboideae
- Genus: Daviesia
- Species: D. ulicifolia

Binomial name
- Daviesia ulicifolia Andrews

Synonyms
- List: Daviesia genistoides Lodd., G.Lodd. & W.Lodd.; Daviesia ulicina Donn nom. inval., nom. nud.; Daviesia ulicina Sm. nom. illeg., nom. superfl.; Daviesia ulicina f. communis Benth.; Daviesia ulicina f. subumbellata Benth.; Daviesia ulicina Sm. f. ulicina; Daviesia ulicina var. communis (Benth.) Maiden & Betche; Daviesia ulicina var. subumbellata (Benth.) Ewart; Daviesia ulicina Sm. var. ulicina; Daviesia umbellulata var. angustifolia DC.; Daviesia umbellulata var. ß Hook.f.; Daviesia umbellulata auct. non Sm.: Labillardiere, J.J.H. de (1805); Daviesia umbellulata auct. non Sm.: Candolle, A.P. de in Candolle, A.P. de (ed.) (1825); Daviesia umbellulata auct. non Sm.: Hooker, J.D. (1856)

= Daviesia ulicifolia =

Species of plant

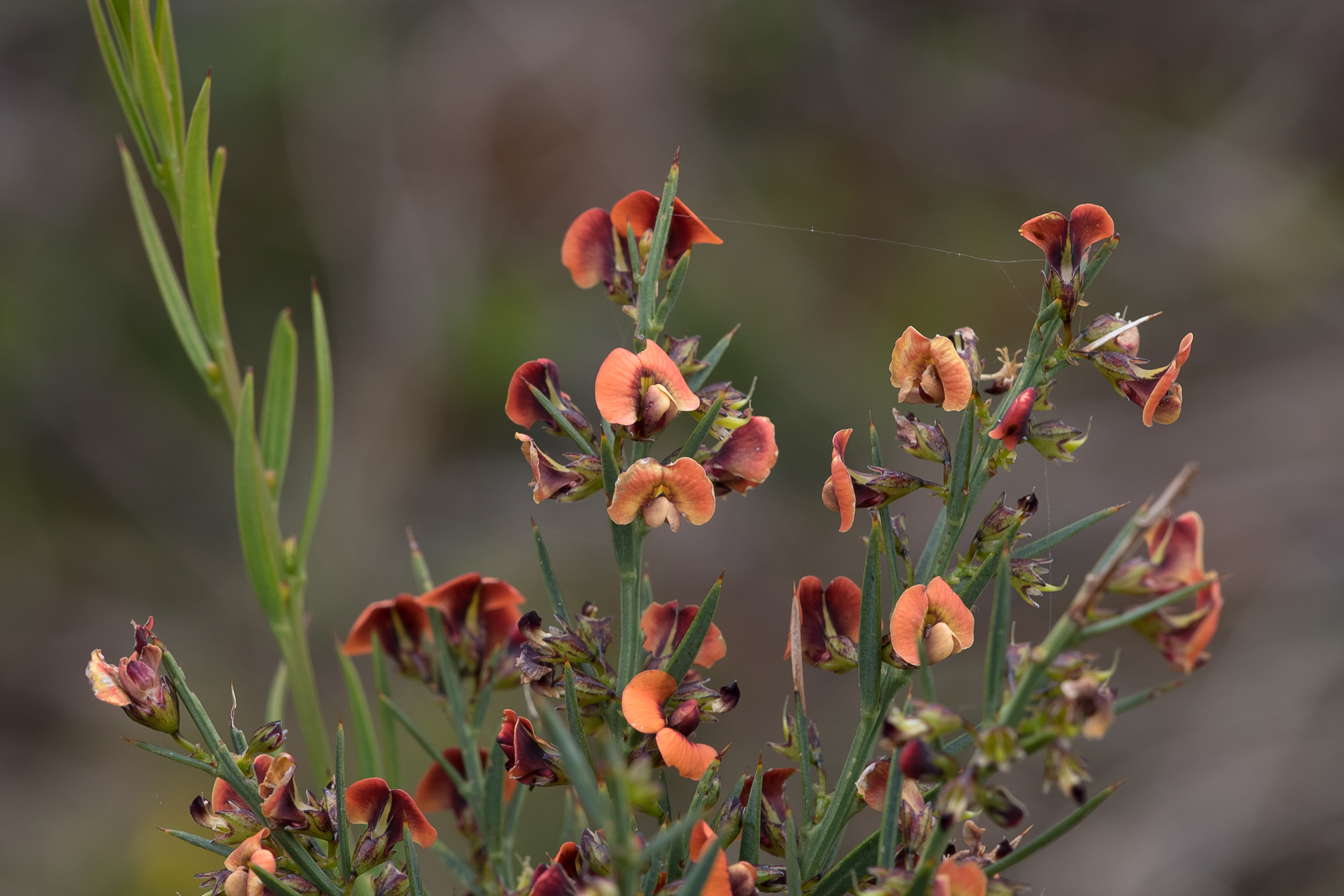
Subspecies incarnata in the Mount Billy Conservation Park, South Australia

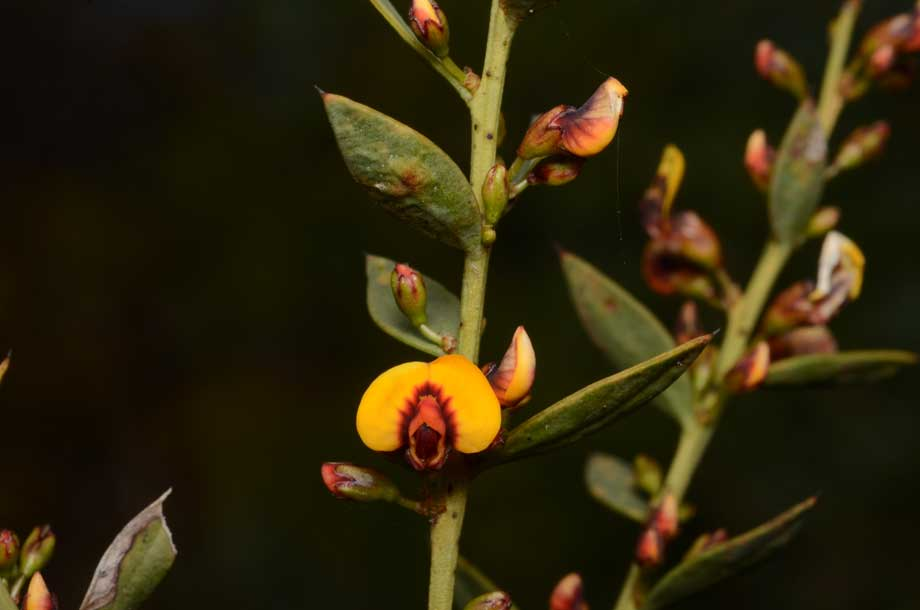
Subspecies pilligensis near Goondiwindi

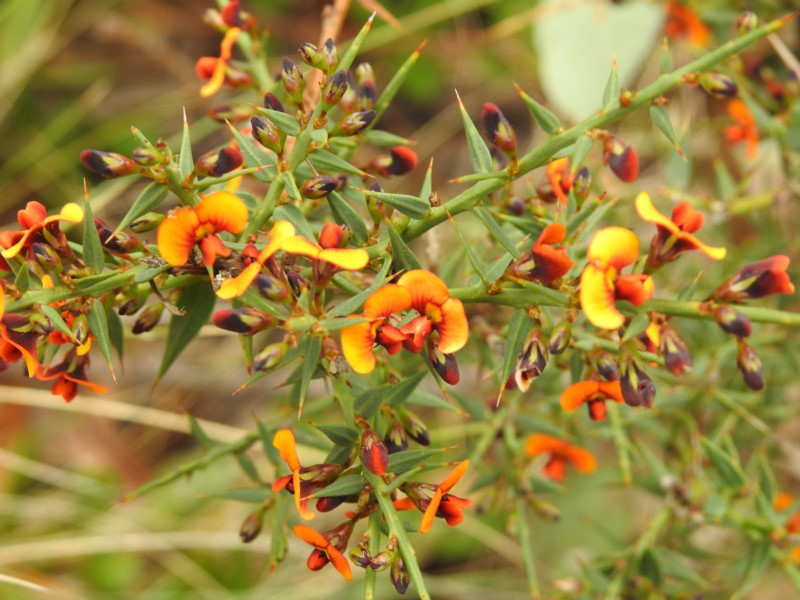
Subspecies ruscifolia in Namadgi National Park

Daviesia ulicifolia, commonly known as gorse bitter-pea, is a species of flowering plant in the family Fabaceae and is endemic to south-eastern Australia. It is a rigid, openly-branched shrub with sharply-pointed, narrow elliptic, narrow egg-shaped, rarely egg-shaped phyllodes and usually orange-yellow and dark red flowers.

== Description ==
Daviesia ulicifolia is a rigid, openly-branched shrub that typically grows to a height of up to 2.5 m (8 ft 2 in) and has spiny branchlets. Its phyllodes are narrow elliptic, narrow egg-shaped, rarely egg-shaped, 5–35 mm (0.20–1.38 in) long and 0.5–6 mm (0.020–0.236 in) wide and sharply pointed with a prominent midrib on the upper surface. The flowers are arranged singly or in pairs, sometimes in groups of up to seven, in leaf axils on a peduncle up to 3 mm (0.12 in) long, the rachis up to 1.1 mm (0.043 in) long, each flower on a pedicel 0.5–5 mm (0.020–0.197 in) long. The sepals are 2–4 mm (0.079–0.157 in) long, the five lobes about 0.5–1 mm (0.020–0.039 in) long. Flower colour varies with subspecies, the standard petal broadly egg-shaped with a notched tip, 3–6 mm (0.12–0.24 in) long, 3–10 mm (0.12–0.39 in) wide, and usually yellow or orange-yellow with a red ring surrounding a yellow centre. The wings are 4–6 mm (0.16–0.24 in) long, yellow and dark red, the keel 4–5 mm (0.16–0.20 in) long and maroon to red. Flowering occurs from August to October, depending on elevation and latitude, and the fruit is a flattened triangular pod 5–8 mm (0.20–0.31 in) long.

== Taxonomy ==
Daviesia ulicifolia was first formally described by English botanist Henry Cranke Andrews in 1803 in The Botanist's Repository for New, and Rare Plants. The specific epithet (ulicifolia) means "gorse-leaved", referring to the distribution of this leucopogon, compared to others in the genus.

In 1997, Gregory T. Chandler and Michael Crisp described six subspecies of D. ulicifolia in Australian Systematic Botany, and the names are accepted by the Australian Plant Census:

- Daviesia ulicifolia subsp. aridicola G.Chandler & Crisp has narrow elliptic, or narrow egg-shaped to linear phyllodes 8–17.5 mm (0.31–0.69 in) long and 1.3–2.5 mm (0.051–0.098 in) wide with two to seven flowers in leaf axils, the standard petal less than 4.5 mm (0.18 in) wide and orange with a red centre;
- Daviesia ulicifolia subsp. incarnata G.Chandler & Crisp has narrow elliptic, or narrow egg-shaped to linear phyllodes 9.5–22 mm (0.37–0.87 in) long and 1–3 mm (0.039–0.118 in) wide with one to seven flowers in leaf axils, the standard petal 7–8 mm (0.28–0.31 in) wide and reddish-orange with a dark red base and a yellow centre;
- Daviesia ulicifolia subsp. pilligensis G.Chandler & Crisp has elliptic to egg-shaped phyllodes 7–20 mm (0.28–0.79 in) long and 2–5 mm (0.079–0.197 in) wide with one or two flowers in leaf axils, the standard petal 4.5–5.5 mm (0.18–0.22 in) wide and yellow with red markings;
- Daviesia ulicifolia subsp. ruscifolia G.Chandler & Crisp has egg-shaped to narrowly egg-shaped phyllodes 5–12 mm (0.20–0.47 in) long and 1.5–4.5 mm (0.059–0.177 in) wide with one or two flowers in leaf axils, the standard petal 5–10 mm (0.20–0.39 in) wide and orange with dark red markings;
- Daviesia ulicifolia subsp. stenophylla G.Chandler & Crisp has linear phyllodes 8–20 mm (0.31–0.79 in) long and 0.5–1.5 mm (0.020–0.059 in) wide with one or two flowers in leaf axils, the standard petal 5–6.5 mm (0.20–0.26 in) wide and bright yellow with a red base and yellow centre;
- Daviesia ulicifolia Andrews subsp. ulicifolia has narrow egg-shaped or narrow elliptic phyllodes 4–20 mm (0.16–0.79 in) long and 1–3 mm (0.039–0.118 in) wide with up to five flowers in leaf axils, the standard petal 3.5–9 mm (0.14–0.35 in) wide and yellow with dark red markings.

== Distribution and habitat ==
Gorse bitter-pea is widely distributed in Australia, where it grows in open forest in all six states, but not the Northern Territory.

- Subspecies aridicola grows in arid areas of the Great Victoria Desert and Murchison bioregions of Western Australia, in a broad area of South Australia, and in the far south-west of New South Wales.
- Subspecies incarnata grows in hilly or mountain areas in the Mount Lofty Ranges of South Australia and in a few isolated places further south.
- Subspecies pilligensis grows in heathy woodland and open forest from south-eastern Queensland to the western slopes of New South Wales, especially in the Pilliga Scrub.
- Subspecies ruscifolia grows in forest from central New South Wales and the Australian Capital Territory to the Grampians National Park in Victoria, and in Tasmania.
- Subspecies stenophylla is mostly found in coastal areas, often in disturbed habitats from the wet tropics of far north Queensland to the Central Coast of New South Wales.
- Subspecies ulicifolia mostly grows in forest and is widespread from south-eastern Queensland, through most of Victoria to south-eastern South Australia and Tasmania.
