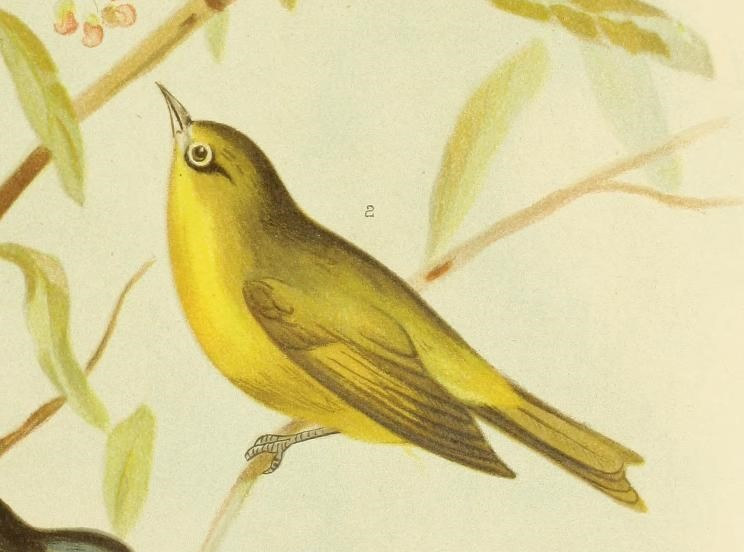

Conservation status
- Least Concern (IUCN 3.1)

Scientific classification
- Kingdom: Animalia
- Phylum: Chordata
- Class: Aves
- Order: Passeriformes
- Family: Zosteropidae
- Genus: Zosterops
- Species: Z. luteus

Binomial name
- Zosterops luteus Gould, 1843

= Canary white-eye =

Species of bird

The canary white-eye or yellow white-eye (Zosterops luteus) is a species of white-eye endemic to northern Australia in subtropical or tropical mangrove forests. Its common name reflects the circle of white feathers around its eye.

== Description ==
Zosterops luteus is a small white-eye with a bright olive back and yellow underparts and lores. It has a characteristic ring of silver-white feathers around its eyes, with a dark loral stripe. It is a nectar feeder with a short, sharp beak and a brush-tipped tongue similar to the honeyeaters.

The bird is 100–110 mm long, with a wingspan of 52–59 mm, a bill of 13-16mm and weighs between 6.5 and 11.0 grams.

== Taxonomy and systematics ==
The canary white-eye or yellow white-eye is a member of the family Zosteropidae, known as white-eyes, or silver-eyes. Their distribution includes Africa, south and east Asia, Australia, and many islands in the Indian and west Pacific Oceans.

The lectotype for this species is ANSP 18264, an adult male collected at Port Essington in the Northern Territory and held in the Academy of Natural Sciences of Drexel University, Philadelphia. There is also a paralectotype ANSP 18265, another adult male collected from the same location.

The species name for the canary white-eye or yellow white-eye is Zosterops luteus Gould, 1843, Greenhill Island, Van Dieman Gulf, Northern Territory, Australia. While there are variations in plumage and size across the range and some intergrading of the races, genetic testing suggests two subspecies split between the western and eastern populations.

Z. l. balstoni Ogilvie-Grant, 1909 is found in coastal northwest Australia from Shark Bay (including Dirk Hartog Island), east to Wotjulum (King Sound) and the Northern Kimberley district.

Z. l. luteus Gould, 1843 is found in coastal northern Australia from the Northern Kimberley district east, including coastal islands of Melville, Bickerton, Groote Eylandt and Sir Edward Pellew Group, to western Cape York Peninsula (Edward River) and an isolated population in eastern Queensland in the region of Ayr to the mouth of Burdekin River.

The family and genus names, Zosteropidae Bonaparte 1853 and Zosterops Vigors & Horsfield 1827, come from the Greek words zoster meaning a warrior's belt or girdle and ops meaning eye. The species name Zosterops luteus combines the genus name with the Latin luteus meaning golden or saffron yellow. The name for the western subspecies balstoni derives from the name of the collector, W.E. Balston, who donated the specimens to the British Museum that Ogilvie-Grant described. Although the name derives from the donor's name, the specimens were collected by Mr G.C. Shortridge who was recognised in the naming of Zosterops shortridgii.

The most commonly used name for the species in Australia is yellow white-eye.

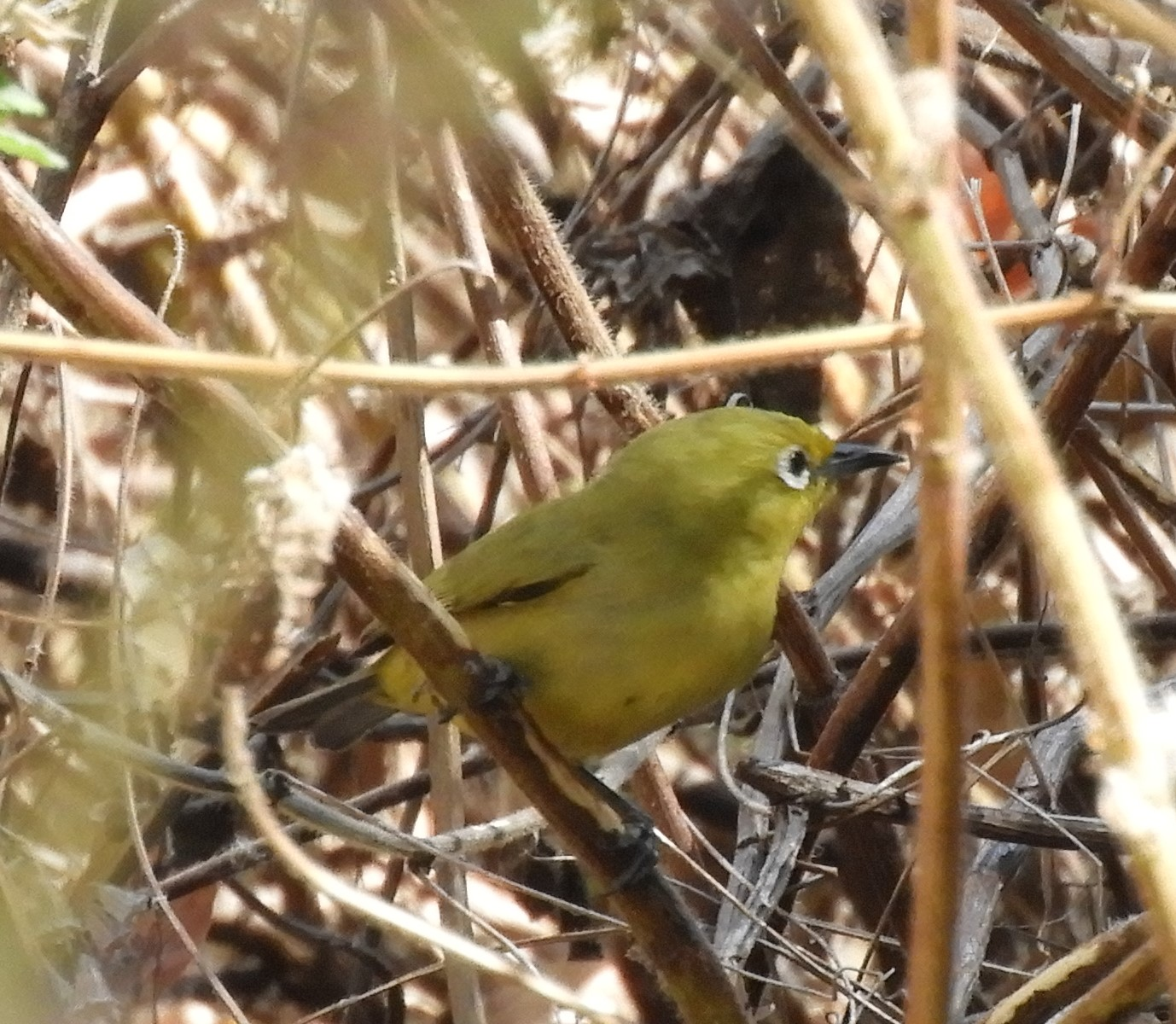
Yellow white-eye at Moochalabra Dam, WA

== Behaviour and ecology ==
The bird is found in mangrove, mangal and adjacent riverine vegetation. They feed on insects including larvae in the outer foliage of small trees or shrubs and occasionally on muddy mangrove flats. They are gregarious, usually found in pairs or small flocks.

The IUCN Red List rating, the Northern Territory Conservation Status, Queensland Conservation Status and Western Australian Conservation Status for this species is Least Concern (LC).
