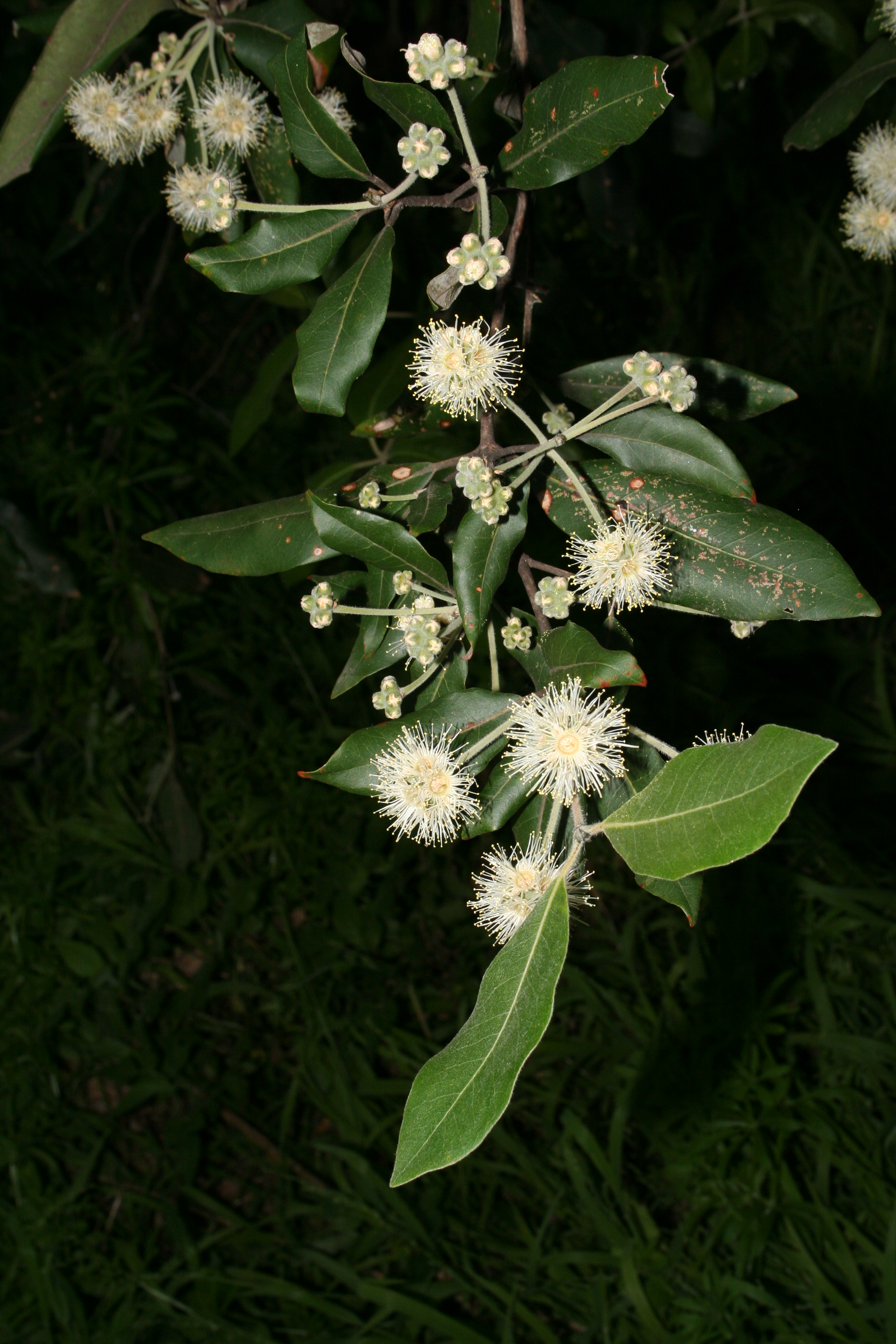

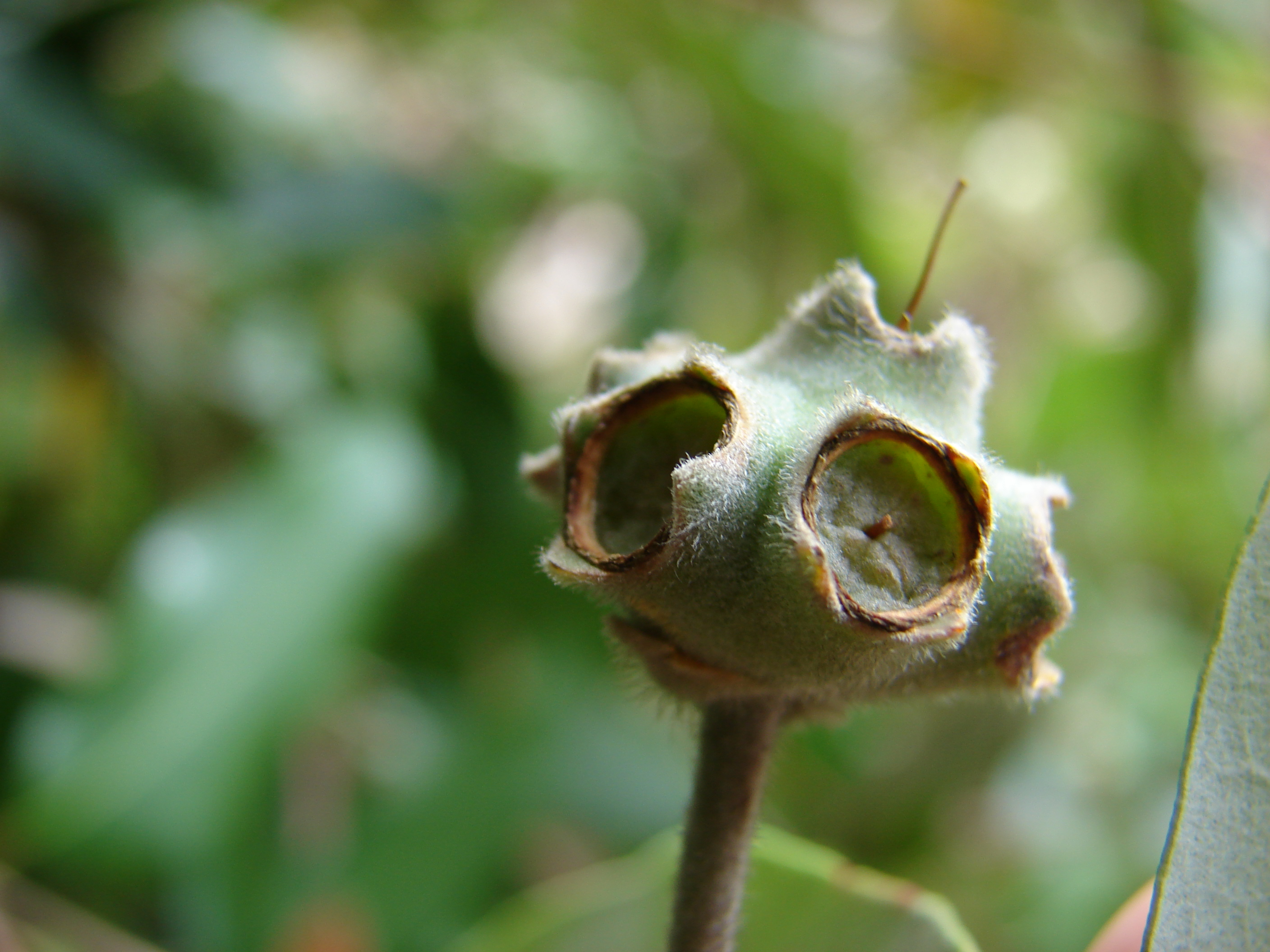
- young fruit

Conservation status
- Least Concern (IUCN 3.1)

Scientific classification
- Kingdom: Plantae
- Clade: Tracheophytes
- Clade: Angiosperms
- Clade: Eudicots
- Clade: Rosids
- Order: Myrtales
- Family: Myrtaceae
- Genus: Syncarpia
- Species: S. glomulifera

Binomial name
- Syncarpia glomulifera (Sm.) Nied.

Synonyms
- Syncarpia laurifolia Ten.

= Syncarpia glomulifera =

Turpentine tree

Species of tree

Syncarpia glomulifera, commonly known as the turpentine tree, or yanderra, is a tree of the family Myrtaceae native to New South Wales and Queensland in Australia, which can reach 60 metres (200 feet) in height. It generally grows on heavier soils. The cream flowers appear in spring and are fused into compound flowerheads.

== Taxonomy ==
English botanist James Edward Smith first described the turpentine as Metrosideros glomulifera in 1797, from a collection in the Sydney district. It was given its current binomial name by German botanist Franz Josef Niedenzu in 1893. Common names include turpentine, luster, red turpentine or red luster. It was formerly known as Syncarpia laurifolia Ten. Two subspecies are recognised, the widespread nominate, and subspecies glabra which is found from Bulahdelah north to Kempsey and has smooth leaf undersurfaces.

== Description ==
In a suitable location, the turpentine grows into a large straight-trunked tree up to 45 or even 55 m (150–180 ft) high with a DBH of up to 1.3 or even 1.5 m (4–5 ft). On poorer soils it grows as a small tree or even adopts a mallee habit. The thick brown bark is fibrous, with deep vertical furrows running down the trunk. The leaves are arranged oppositely on the stems, and pairs grow close together so that they resemble a whorled group of four leaves. On 0.7–1.3 cm long petioles, the thick leaves are ovate to ellipictal and measure 7–10 cm (3–4 in) long and 2.5–4.5 cm (1–2 in) across with recurved margins. Their upper surface is a dull dark green, and lower surface much paler, either covered by fine hairs in subspecies glomulifera or smooth in glabra. Flowering takes place from August to December, peaking in September. The cream flowers are fused in groups of seven into compound flowerheads. This is followed by the development of the compound fruit – 1 to 2 cm (0.39 to 0.79 in) diameter woody capsules which ripen in summer.

== Distribution and habitat ==
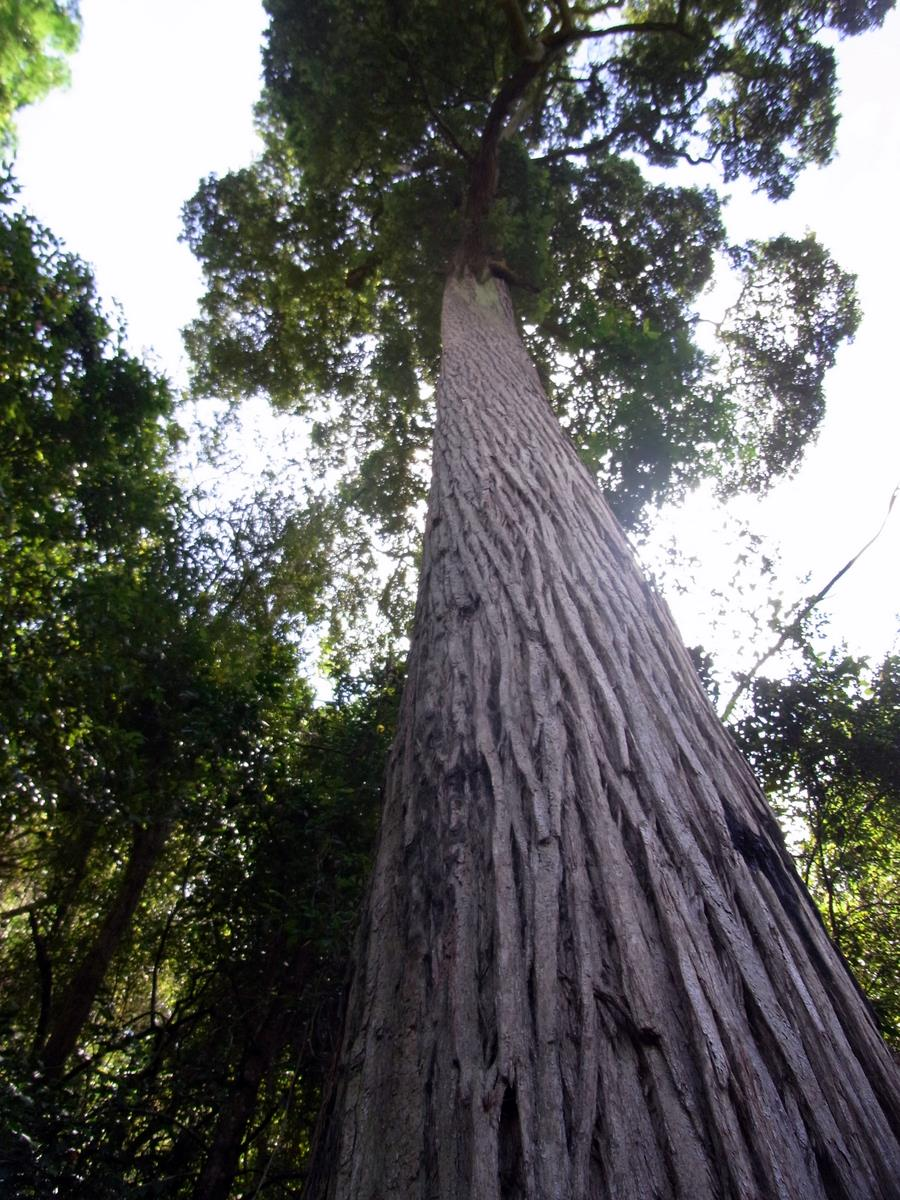
a large tree at Springwood, Blue Mountains National Park

The turpentine is found in eastern Queensland and New South Wales, from Atherton in the far north to as far south as Murramarang National Park. North of Gympie, the distribution is fragmented, with colonies on the Blackdown and Consuelo Tablelands, Tinaroo district and Windsor Tableland. The habitat most commonly associated with the turpentine is transitional forest between rainforest and wet sclerophyll forest. Here it grows as an emergent tree, and is associated with such trees as flooded gum (Eucalyptus grandis), tallowwood (E. microcorys), grey ironbark (E. paniculata), white stringybark (E. globoidea), yellow stringybark (E. muelleriana), white-topped box (E. quadrangulata), rough-barked apple (Angophora floribunda), brush box (Lophostemon confertus) and various rainforest species. It also grows with spotted gum (Corymbia maculata) and blackbutt (E. pilularis). On poorer soils, it can grow much smaller in dry sclerophyll forest in association with smooth-barked apple (Angophora costata) and yellow bloodwood (Corymbia eximia).

Adaptable to a wide range of soils, the turpentine is most suited to moderate to high-nutrient soils, such as clay soil over Wianamatta shale in the Sydney region. Valleys and flat areas are highly suitable sites. In the Sydney region, the species reaches an altitude of 300 m (980 ft), but this extends to 900 m (3,000 ft) above sea level in northern Queensland.

The turpentine is one of the dominant species of the critically endangered Sydney Turpentine-Ironbark Forest ecological community.

The largest known turpentine, located near the Williams River Recreation Reserve in the Barrington Tops National Park, New South Wales, measures 7.90 m (26 ft) trunk circumference at breast height, 58 m (190 ft) tall, 20 m (66 ft) crown spread width and "points 517" (points calculated using the National Register of Big Trees formula).

== Ecology ==
The flowers are pollinated by native bees and European honeybees, and possibly flies and moths. The grey-headed flying fox (Pteropus poliocephalus) and little red flying fox (P. scapulatus) also pollinate the flowers. The rainbow lorikeet (Trichoglossus haematodus) and noisy miner (Manorina melanocephala) forage for nectar.

The turpentine regenerates after bushfire by resprouting from its lignotuber and epicormic buds. Turpentine trees are thought to live up to 500 years.

== Uses ==
Highly durable, turpentine timber is used in heavy-traffic flooring, for poles and wharves. It resists marine invertebrates and termites, and is one of the most difficult timbers to ignite. A hardy and adaptable tree, turpentine tolerates heavy soils and frosts, and is suitable for large gardens and parks, where it provides good shade with its dense canopy.
