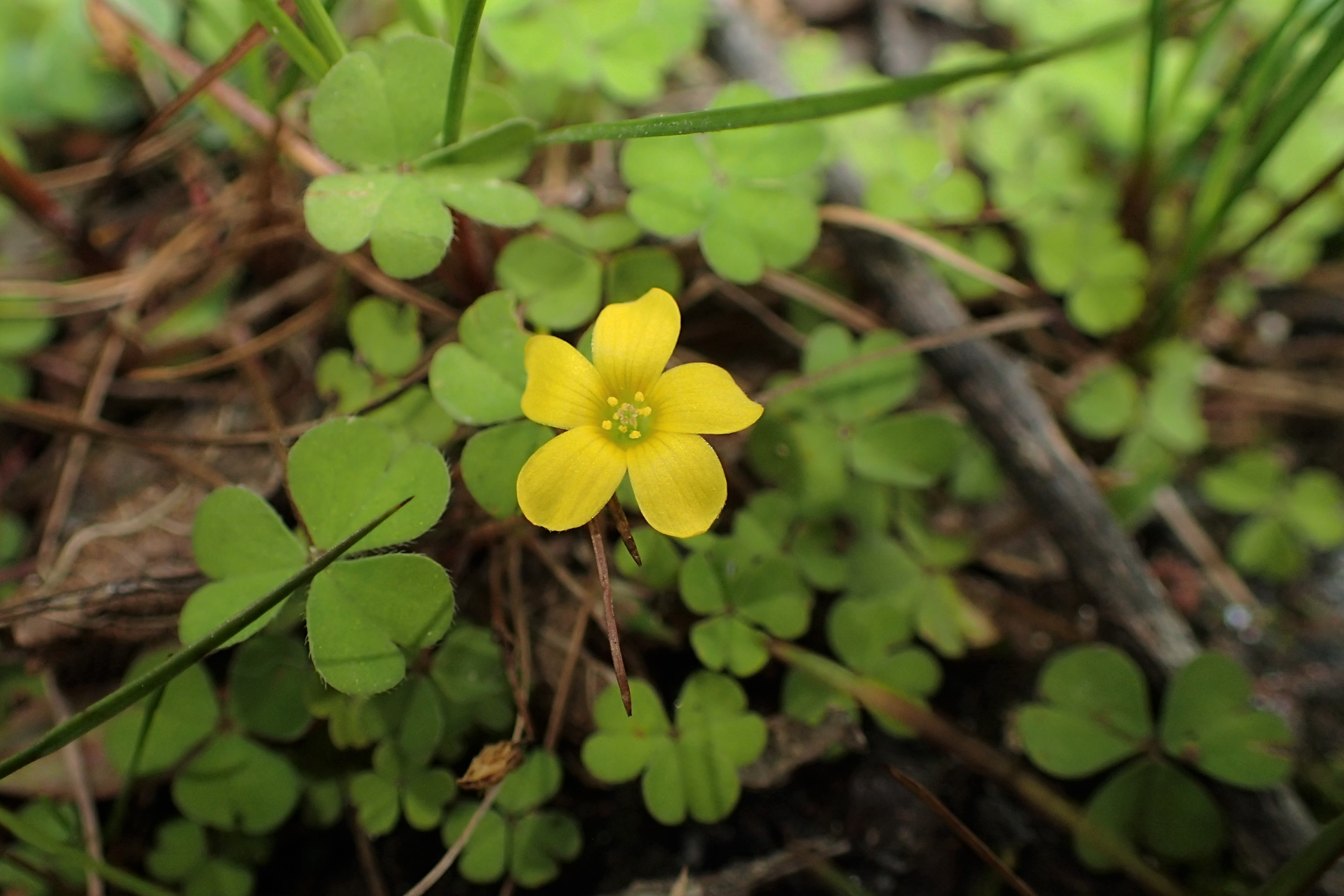

Scientific classification
- Kingdom: Plantae
- Clade: Tracheophytes
- Clade: Angiosperms
- Clade: Eudicots
- Clade: Rosids
- Order: Oxalidales
- Family: Oxalidaceae
- Genus: Oxalis
- Species: O. exilis

Binomial name
- Oxalis exilis A.Cunn.

= Oxalis exilis =

Species of flowering plant

Oxalis exilis, the least yellow sorrel or shady woodsorrel, is a small herbaceous plant found in Australia and New Zealand. It is mainly found in hillsides and weedy areas. It is the smallest species of Oxalis in New Zealand. The colors of the leaves range from green to purple. The capsule and style length vary from 4–6.5 mm.
