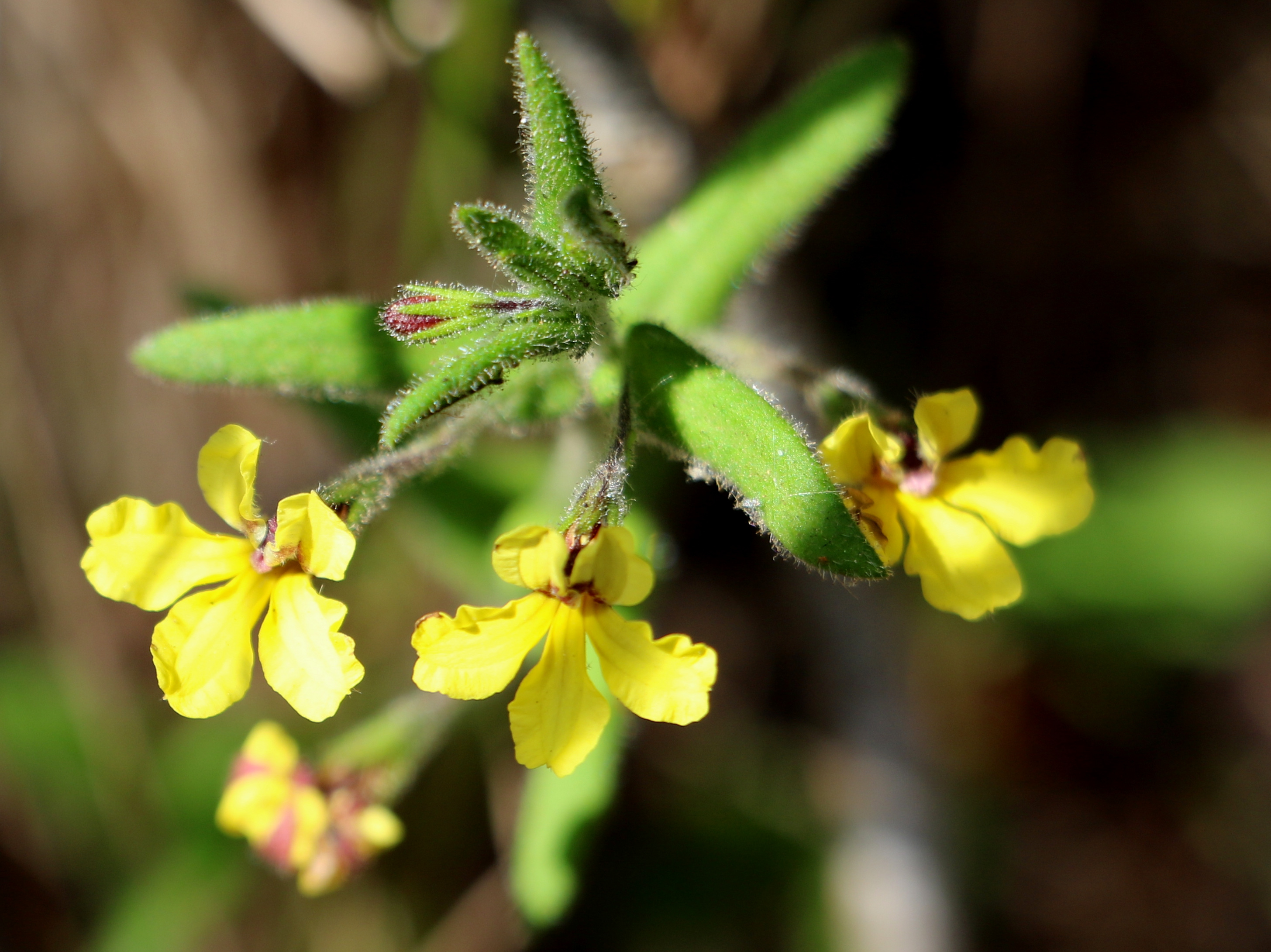
- In a Sydney suburb

Scientific classification
- Kingdom: Plantae
- Clade: Tracheophytes
- Clade: Angiosperms
- Clade: Eudicots
- Clade: Asterids
- Order: Asterales
- Family: Goodeniaceae
- Genus: Goodenia
- Species: G. heterophylla

Binomial name
- Goodenia heterophylla Sm.

= Goodenia heterophylla =

Species of flowering plant

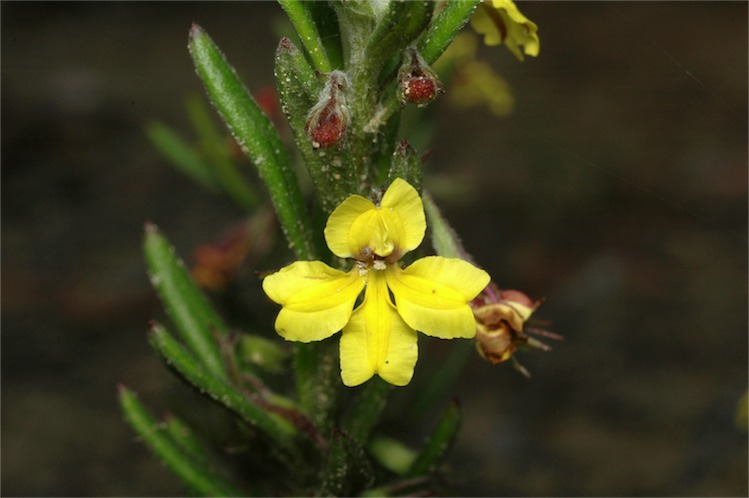
Subsp. montana near Nerriga

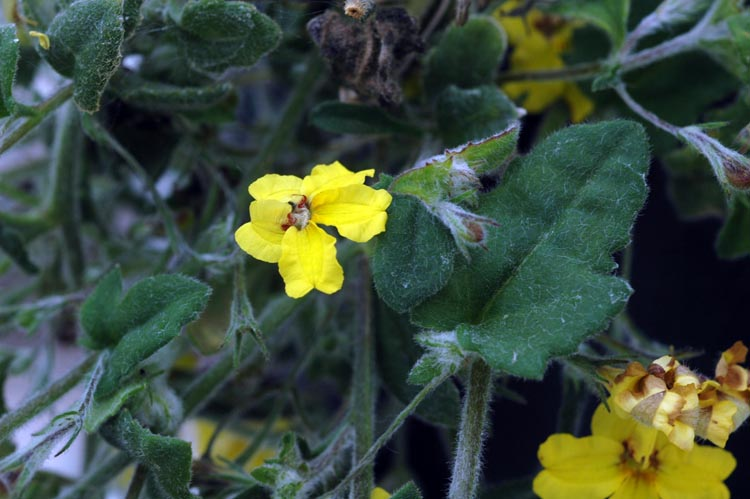
Subsp. eglandulosa in the ANBG

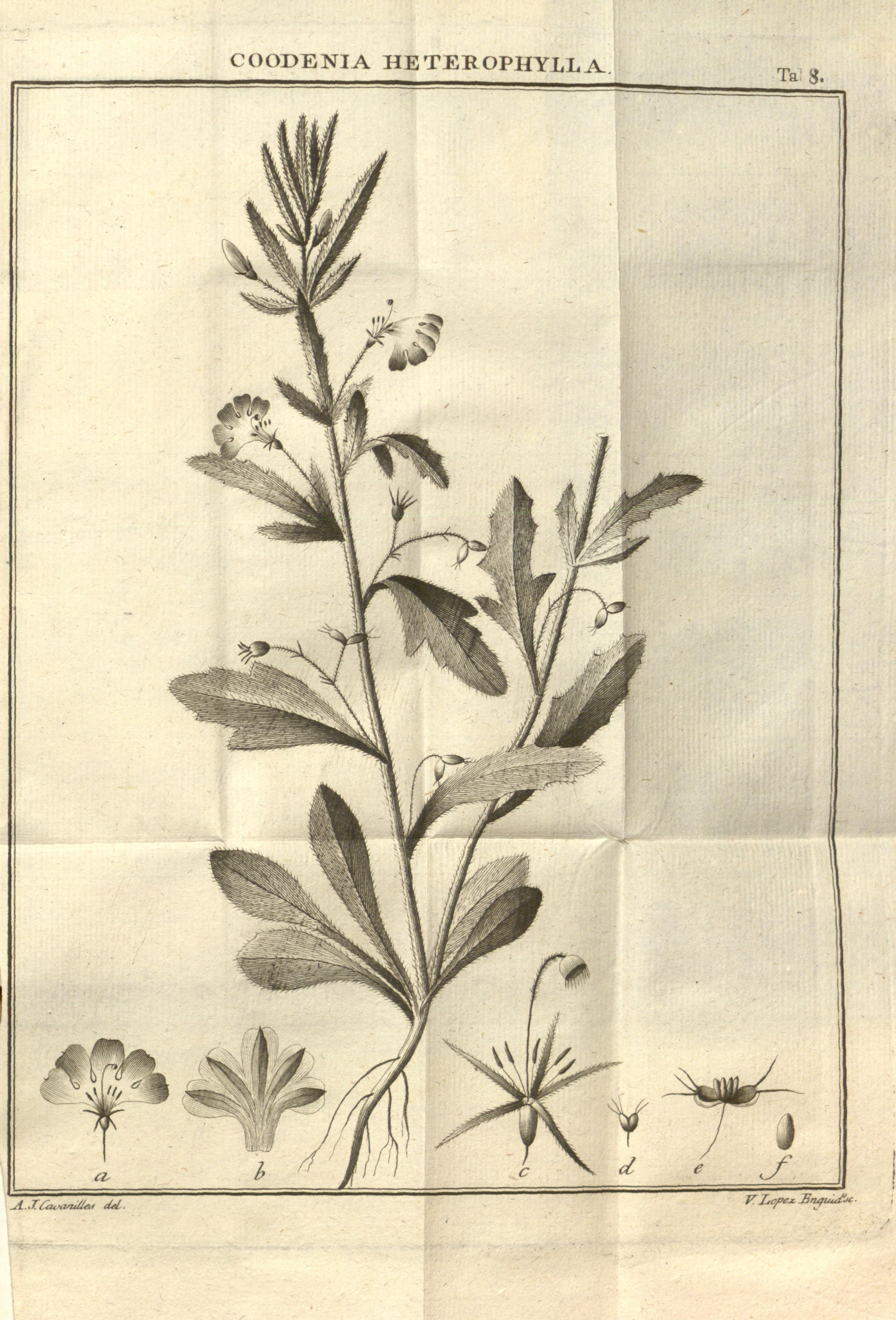
Illustration from Anales de historia natural

Goodenia heterophylla is a species of plant in the family Goodeniaceae and is endemic to eastern Australia. It is an erect to trailing, more or less woody herb or shrub with linear to egg-shaped stem-leaves and racemes or thyrses of yellow flowers.

== Description ==
Goodenia heterophylla is an erect to trailing, more or less woody herb or shrubby plant that grows to a height of up to 40 cm (16 in). The leaves on the stem are linear to egg-shaped, 10–40 mm (0.39–1.57 in) long and 2–10 mm (0.079–0.394 in) wide and sessile, sometimes with toothed or lobed edges. The leaves at the base of the plant are ephemeral. The flowers are arranged in leafy racemes or thyrses up to 300 mm (12 in) long on a peduncle 6–15 mm (0.24–0.59 in) long with linear bracteoles 2–4 mm (0.079–0.157 in) long. Each flower is on a pedicel 4–7 mm (0.16–0.28 in) long with linear to lance-shaped sepals 2–4 mm (0.079–0.157 in) long. The corolla is up to 12 mm (0.47 in) long, the lower lobes up to 5 mm (0.20 in) long with wings up to 1.5 mm (0.059 in) wide. Flowering mainly occurs from August to May and the fruit is a broadly oval capsule up to 3 mm (0.12 in) long.

== Taxonomy ==
Goodenia heterophylla was first formally described in 1794 by English botanist James Edward Smith in Transactions of the Linnean Society of London from specimens collected by John White at Port Jackson. The species was first formally described by English botanist James Edward Smith in 1794 in Transactions of the Linnean Society of London.

In 1990, Roger Charles Carolin described four subspecies in the journal Telopea, and the names are accepted by the Australian Plant Census:

- Goodenia heterophylla subsp. eglandulosa Carolin, an ascending to erect herb that differs from the autonym in lacking glandular hairs and having serrated, egg-shaped leaves;
- Goodenia heterophylla Sm. subsp. heterophylla (the autonym), an ascending to erect herb with usually egg-shaped leaves 15–30 mm (0.59–1.18 in) long and 3–8 mm (0.12–0.31 in) wide, usually serrated, the foliage with simple and glandular hairs;
- Goodenia heterophylla subsp. montana Carolin, an erect, more or less woody herb that differs from the autonym in having linear to narrow oblong leaves 15–25 mm (0.59–0.98 in) long and 2–3 mm (0.079–0.118 in) wide with smooth edges that are turned downwards, the foliage covered with woolly or cottony hairs;
- Goodenia heterophylla subsp. teucriifolia (F.Muell.) Carolin, formerly known as Goodenia teucriifolia F.Muell., a low-lying to spreading herb with flat, egg-shaped leaves 10–40 mm (0.39–1.57 in) long and 5–15 mm (0.20–0.59 in) wide with serrated edges and that is endemic to Queensland.

== Distribution and habitat ==
This goodenia grows in forest and woodland, often on sandstone. Subspecies eglandulosa occurs in coastal and tableland areas of New South Wales from near Wauchope to Jervis Bay in New South Wales. Subspecies heterophylla is mostly found between Gloucester and Lithgow in New South Wales but sometimes also in north eastern Victoria. Subspecies montana is found in forest between Lithgow and the Nerriga area and subsp. teucriifolia is restricted to the Glass House Mountains area in Queensland.
