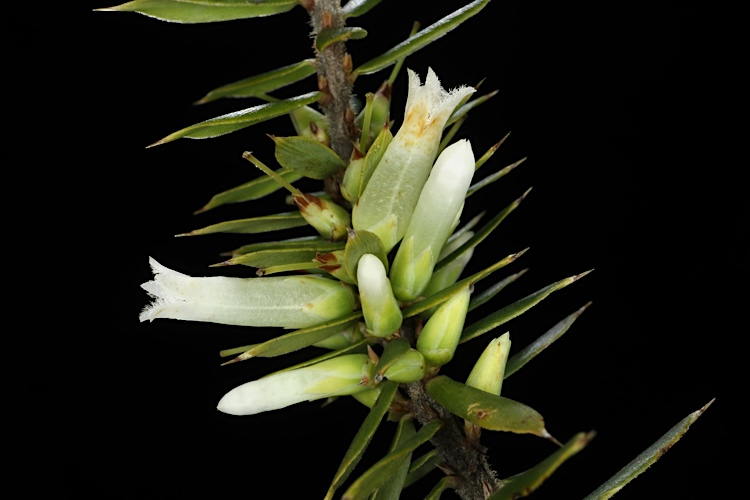
- Styphelia sieberi in the Australian National Botanic Gardens

Scientific classification
- Kingdom: Plantae
- Clade: Tracheophytes
- Clade: Angiosperms
- Clade: Eudicots
- Clade: Asterids
- Order: Ericales
- Family: Ericaceae
- Genus: Styphelia
- Species: S. sieberi

Binomial name
- Styphelia sieberi (DC.) Hislop, Crayn & Puente-Lel.
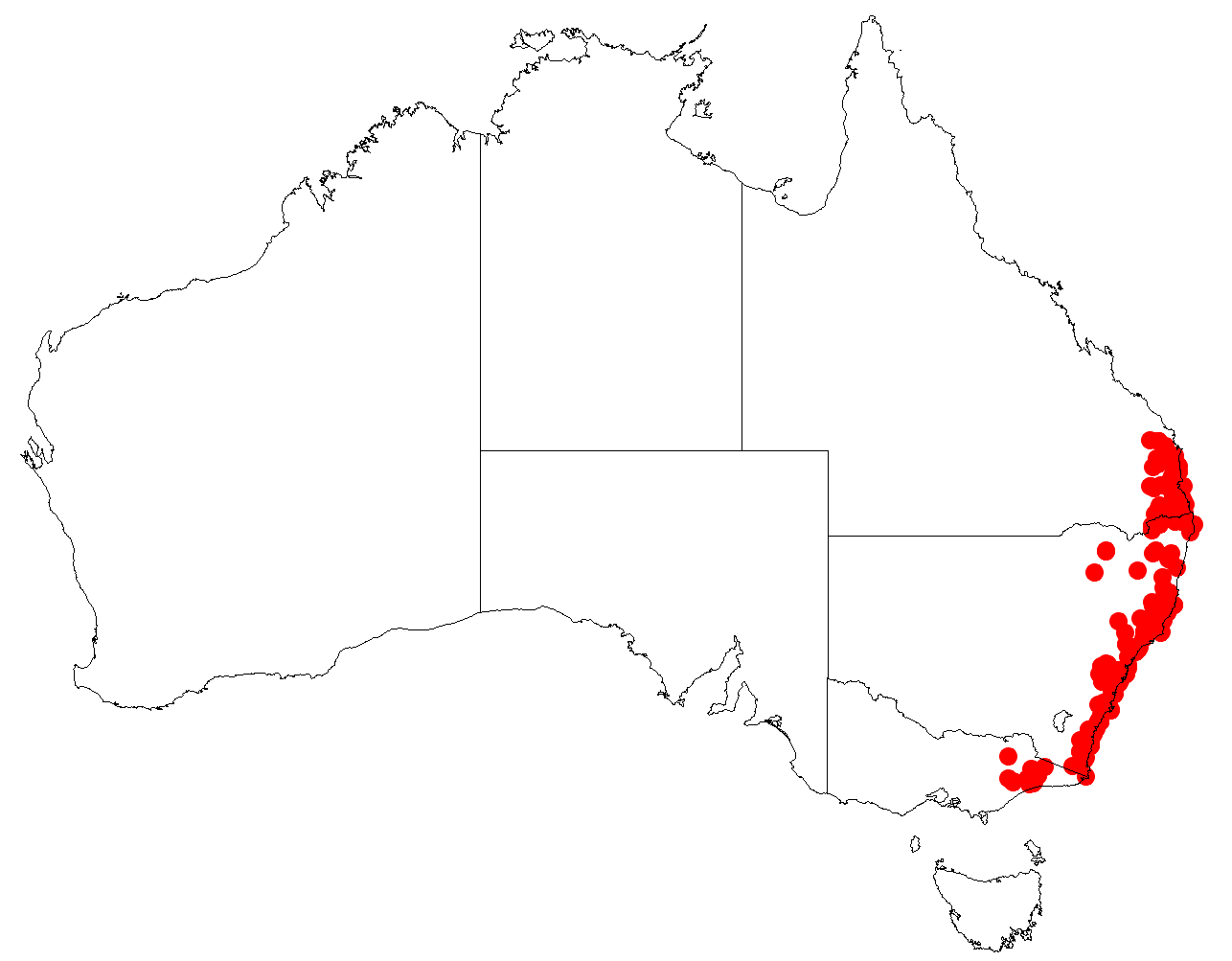
- Occurrence data from AVH

Synonyms
- Leucopogon sieberi DC.; Epacris villosa Cav.; Leucopogon juniperinus R.Br.; Leucopogon villosus (Cav.) Druce nom. illeg.; Lissanthe propinqua A.Cunn. ex DC.; Lissanthe strigosa Sieber ex DC. not validly publ.; Styphelia juniperina (R.Br.) Spreng. nom. illeg.; Styphelia villosa (Cav.) Dryand.

= Styphelia sieberi =

Prickly bearded heath

Species of shrub

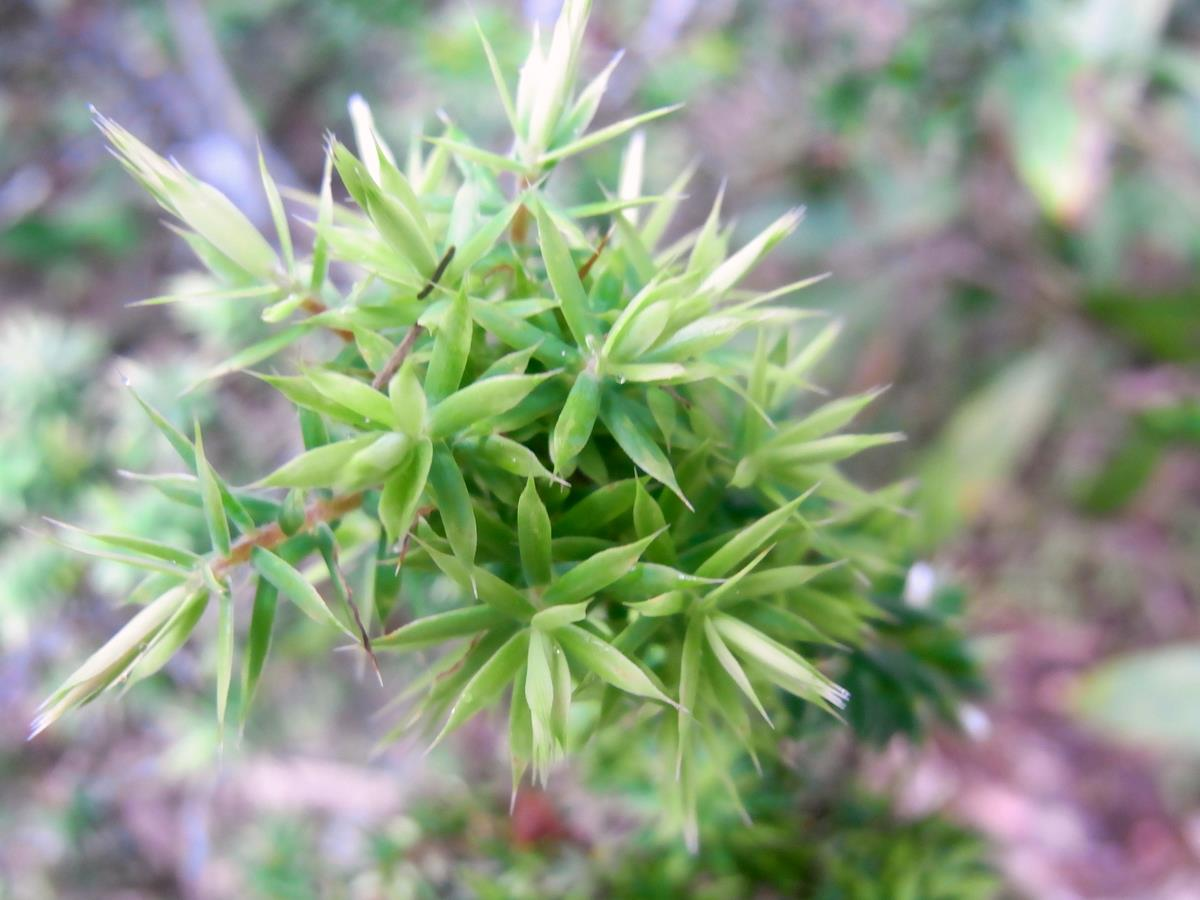
Foliage in Batemans Bay Botanic Gardens

Styphelia sieberi, commonly known as prickly beard-heath, is a species of flowering plant in the heath family Ericaceae and is endemic to south-eastern continental Australia. It is an erect, densely-branched shrub with oblong to more or less egg-shaped leaves with the narrower end towards the base, and white, tube-shaped flowers arranged singly in upper leaf axils.

== Description ==
Styphelia sieberi is an erect, densely-branched shrub that typically grows to a height of up to about 1 m (3 ft 3 in), and has softly-hairy branchlets. The leaves are oblong to more or less egg-shaped with the narrower end towards the base, 5.6–11.8 mm (0.22–0.46 in) long and 1.2–2.5 mm (0.047–0.098 in) wide on a petiole 0.3–0.6 mm (0.012–0.024 in) long. The edges of the leaves are finely toothed, there is a sharp point up to 1 mm (0.039 in) long on the tip, and the surfaces are more or less glabrous. The flowers are arranged singly in upper leaf axils on a peduncle about 1 mm (0.039 in) long, with bracteoles 1.3–1.7 mm (0.051–0.067 in) long at the base. The sepals are 2.8–4 mm (0.11–0.16 in) long, the petals white and joined at the base to form a tube 5.4–7.9 mm (0.21–0.31 in) long with lobes 1.9–2.9 mm (0.075–0.114 in) long. Flowering occurs from May to October and the fruit is a smooth, glabrous, oval to elliptic drupe 3.2–4 mm (0.13–0.16 in) long.

== Taxonomy ==
This species was first formally described in 1810 by Robert Brown who gave it the name Leucopogon juniperinus in his Prodromus Florae Novae Hollandiae et Insulae Van Diemen. In 2020, Michael Hislop, Darren Crayn and Caroline Puente-Lelievre transferred the species to Styphelia as S. sieberi in Australian Systematic Botany. The name S. juniperina was not available, because it had already been given to a species, now known as Leptecophylla juniperina. The specific epithet (sieberi) honours Franz Sieber.

== Distribution and habitat ==
Prickly beard-heath grows in forest and open shrubland on the coast and nearby tablelands of south-eastern Queensland, New South Wales and east of the Mitchell River in Victoria.
