= Maire =

Maire may refer to:

== Places ==
- Maire, Netherlands, a former municipality
- Maire de Castroponce, a municipality located in the province of Zamora, Castile and León, Spain
- Château Saint-Maire, a castle in Lausanne, Switzerland
- Lougé-sur-Maire, a commune in the Orne department in north-western France

== Plants ==
- Black maire (Notelaea cunninghamii), a large tree endemic to New Zealand
- Coastal maire (Notelaea apetala), a small tree endemic to New Zealand
- Narrow-leaved maire (Notelaea montana) - a tree endemic to New Zealand
- Swamp maire (Syzygium maire), a tree endemic to New Zealand
- White maire (Notelaea neolanceolata), a tree endemic to New Zealand

== Mairé ==
- Mairé, a commune in the Vienne department in the Poitou-Charentes region in western France
- Mairé-Levescault, a commune in the Deux-Sèvres department in western France
- Junian of Mairé (died 587), founder of Mairé, or Mariacum, Abbey in Poitou, France

== Other uses ==
- Maire (surname), a surname
- Máire, the Irish Gaelic form of the given name "Mary"
- Máire (album), an album by Máire Brennan
- Maire, French language for Mayor

== See also ==
- Le Maire (disambiguation)
