= Caloptilia chalcodelta =

Scientific classification
- Kingdom: Animalia
- Phylum: Arthropoda
- Clade: Pancrustacea
- Class: Insecta
- Order: Lepidoptera
- Family: Gracillariidae
- Genus: Caloptilia
- Species: C. chalcodelta

Binomial name
- Caloptilia chalcodelta (Meyrick, 1889)

Synonyms
- Gracillaria chalcodelta Meyrick, 1889

Species of moth endemic to New Zealand

Caloptilia chalcodelta is a moth of the family Gracillariidae. It was first described by Edward Meyrick in 1889. This species is endemic to New Zealand and has only been observed in the North Island. This moth inhabits native forest. Adults are on the wing all year round but are most commonly seen from December until March. Larvae mine and fold leaves of species in the plant genus Nestegis.

== Taxonomy ==
This species was first described by Edward Meyrick in 1889 and originally named Gracillaria chalcodelta. George Hudson discussed and illustrated this species under this name in his 1928 book The butterflies and moths of New Zealand. In 1988 John S. Dugdale placed this species in the genus Caloptilia. The female lectotype, collected in Masterton in March by Meyrick, is held at the Natural History Museum, London.

== Description ==
Illustration by Hudson.

Meyrick described the adults of this species as follows:

♂♀. 11-13mm. Head whitish-yellowish, more or less reddish-ochreous on crown. Palpi reddish-ochreous mixed with dark fuscous. Antennae dark fuscous, ringed with whitish. Thorax reddish-ochreous. Abdomen whitish-grey. Legs purple-blackish, banded with white, middle tibiae with large tuft of rough scales beneath, posterior tibiae white. Forewings elongate, very narrow, long-pointed ; reddish-ochreous, with purple gloss, with scattered blackish and yellow-whitish scales forming indications of obscure transverse strigulge ; costa and inner margin distinctly strigulated with black and pale yellowish ; a pale brassy-yellow well-defined triangular patch on costa before middle, reaching about half across wing : cilia light grey, on costa and round apex reddish-ochreous, round apex mixed with blackish in several ill-defined lines. Hindwings and cilia light grey.

The tibiae of the intermediate legs are enlarged by a dense clothing of blackish scales and this is very conspicuous when the insect is resting.

== Distribution ==
This species is endemic to New Zealand. It has only been observed in the North Island.

== Habitat and hosts ==
Leafmine of C. chalcodelta larva in a N. cunninghami leaf.

C. chalcodelta inhabits native forest. The larvae of this species mine and fold leaves of species in the genus Nestegis including Nestegis cunninghamii, Nestegis lanceolata and Nestegis montana.

== Behaviour ==
Adults are on the wing all year round but are most commonly observed from December until March. This species has been collected by sweeping vegetation.

When settling after flight, each antenna are often swung alternately in circles for some time. The wings of the moth are tightly closed around the body, with their tips touching the object on which the insect is resting. The head is raised up, and the entire body and wings held at an angle of about 20 degrees. The hind-legs are closely pressed to the body, the tarsi being held slightly divergent and helping to support the tip of the wings and the body of the insect. The fore- and intermediate legs are held close together, with only the tips of the tarsi touching the support.The antennae are held backwards along the middle of the wings. One of the tarsi of the fore-legs is often held clear of the ground and vibrated with the antennae.
