= Native olive =

Native olive is a common name for several plants and may refer to:

- Bursaria incana (Pittosporaceae)
- Bursaria spinosa (Pittosporaceae)
- Chionanthus ramiflorus (Oleaceae)
- Notelaea ligustrina (Oleaceae)
- Notelaea lloydii (Oleaceae)
- Notelaea microcarpa (Oleaceae)
- Olea paniculata (Oleaceae)

== See also ==
- Wild olive
