= Coomonte =

Coordinates: 42°07′N 5°49′W

Coomonte, Spain
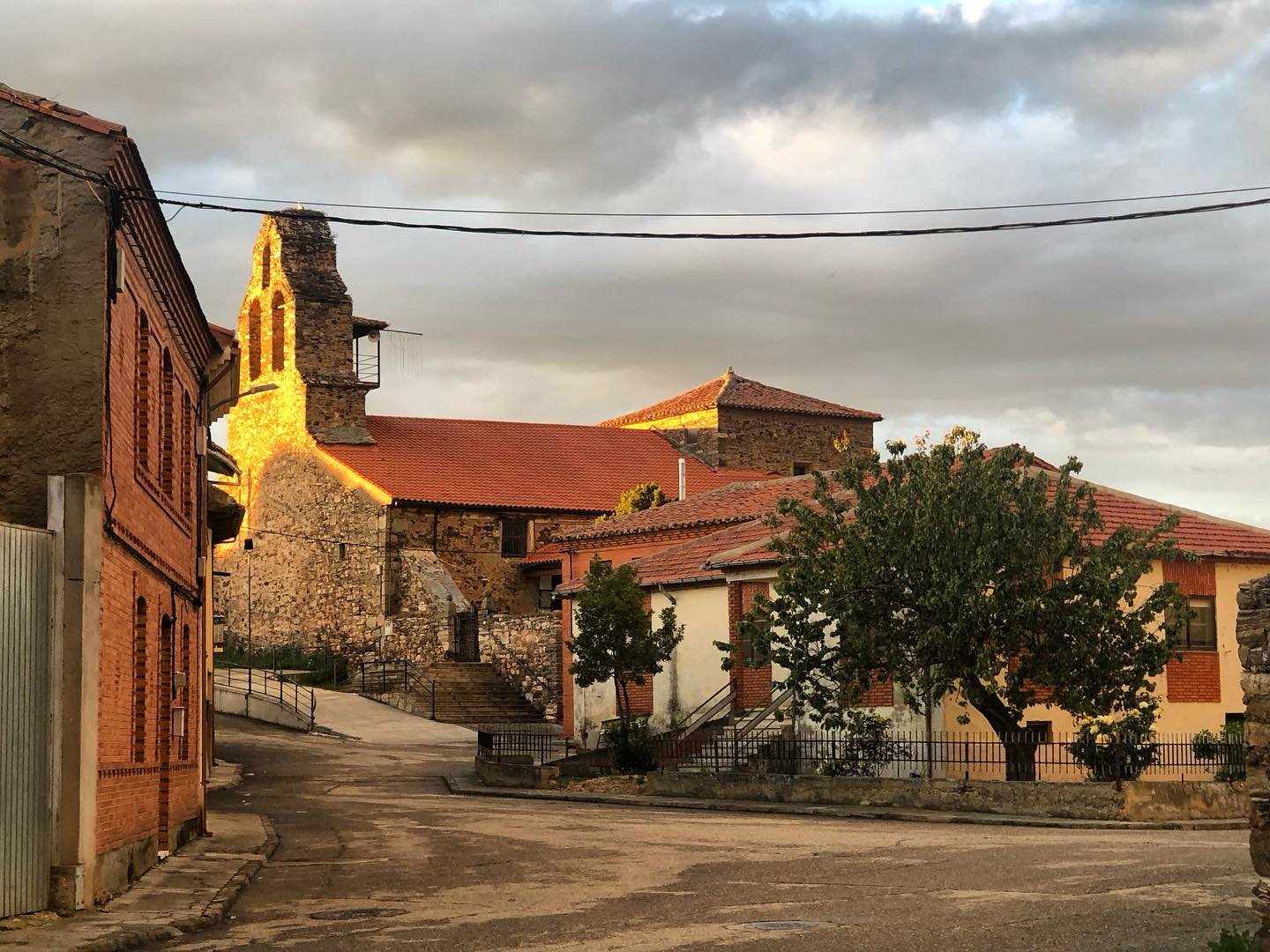

- Flag Coat of arms
- Interactive map of Coomonte, Spain
- Country: Spain
- Autonomous community: Castile and León
- Province: Zamora
- Municipality: Coomonte

Government
  - Alcalde (Mayor): Maximiliano Federico Velicias Baladrón

Area
  - Total: 10 km^{2} (3.9 sq mi)
- Elevation: 732 m (2,402 ft)

Population (2023)
  - Total: 175
  - Density: 18/km^{2} (45/sq mi)
- Time zone: UTC+1 (CET)
  - Summer (DST): UTC+2 (CEST)

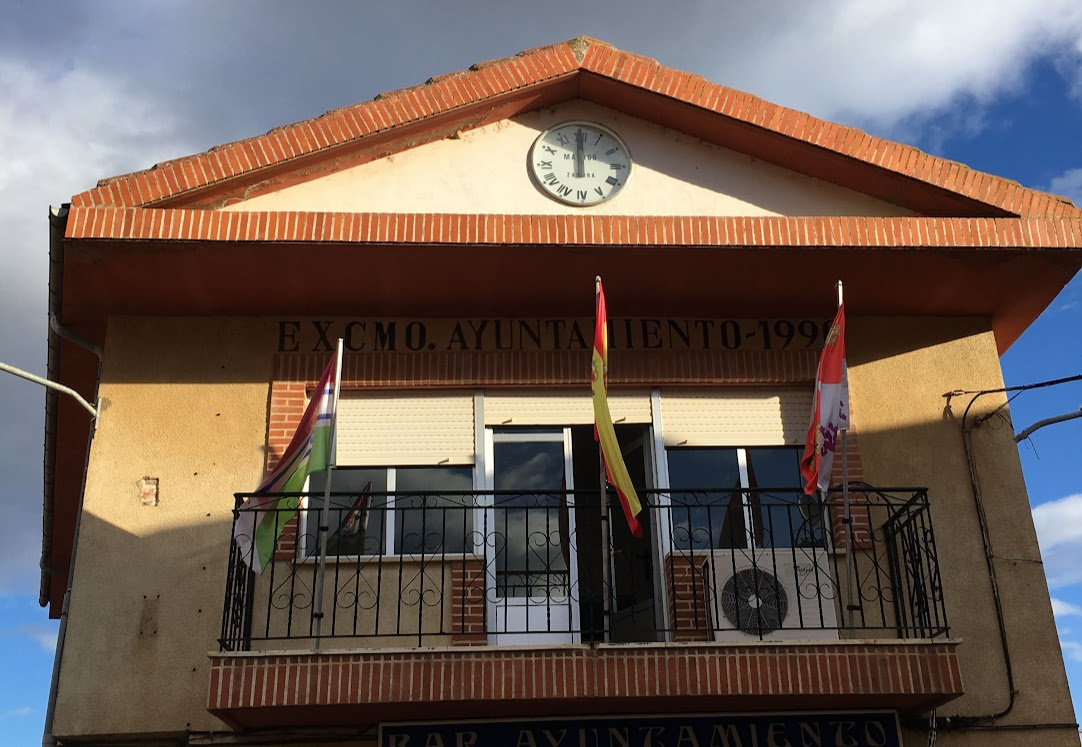
Former town hall building of Coomonte. The new town hall has been recently moved to the Casa de Cultura (House of Culture) building.

Coomonte is a municipality and a town located in the province of Zamora, Castile and León, Spain. According to the 2023 Census (INE), the municipality has a population of 175 inhabitants.

== Geography ==
The municipality is formed by just one population nucleus, and it is located at the north border of the Province of Zamora, bordering with León. The surrounding municipalities of Coomonte are Alija del Infantado (North), Villaferrueña (West), Maire de Castroponce (West) and Santa María de la Vega (South).

== History ==
The first written references about Coomonte are dated about the Late Middle Ages. They refer to the Church of San Juan (Saint John Baptist), their priests and donations made to the monastery of San Esteban de Nogales. During the 14th and 15th centuries there were several documents naming the council ("concejo") of Coomonte. Most of the documents of the Middle Ages and the Renaissence that contains the name of the town are court orders ("ejecutorias").

During the early 16th century, the council of Coomonte hired the dutch painter Juan de Holanda to make the altar of the church. During that century soldiers of Coomonte took part in the wars of the King of Spains, for example in 1580, enlisting them to the war of Philip II to the annexation of Portugal to the Spanish Crown.

During the 17th century, is known thar the flood of the Órbigo river caused catastrophic events and the population decreased. Along this century, also are frequent the documentation about court orders and census.

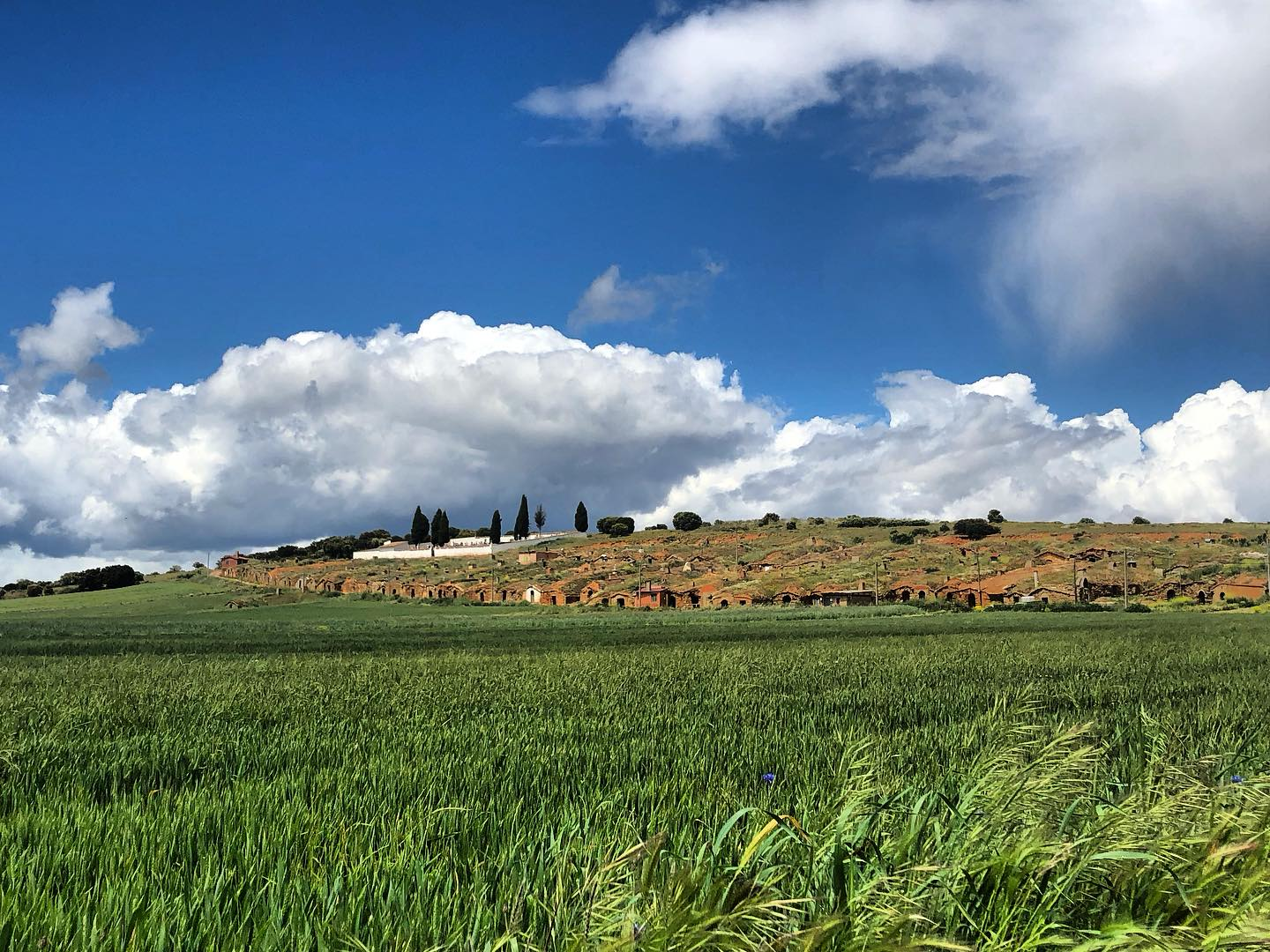
Traditional wineries of Coomonte. Its line arrangement gives it a unique appearance in the area.

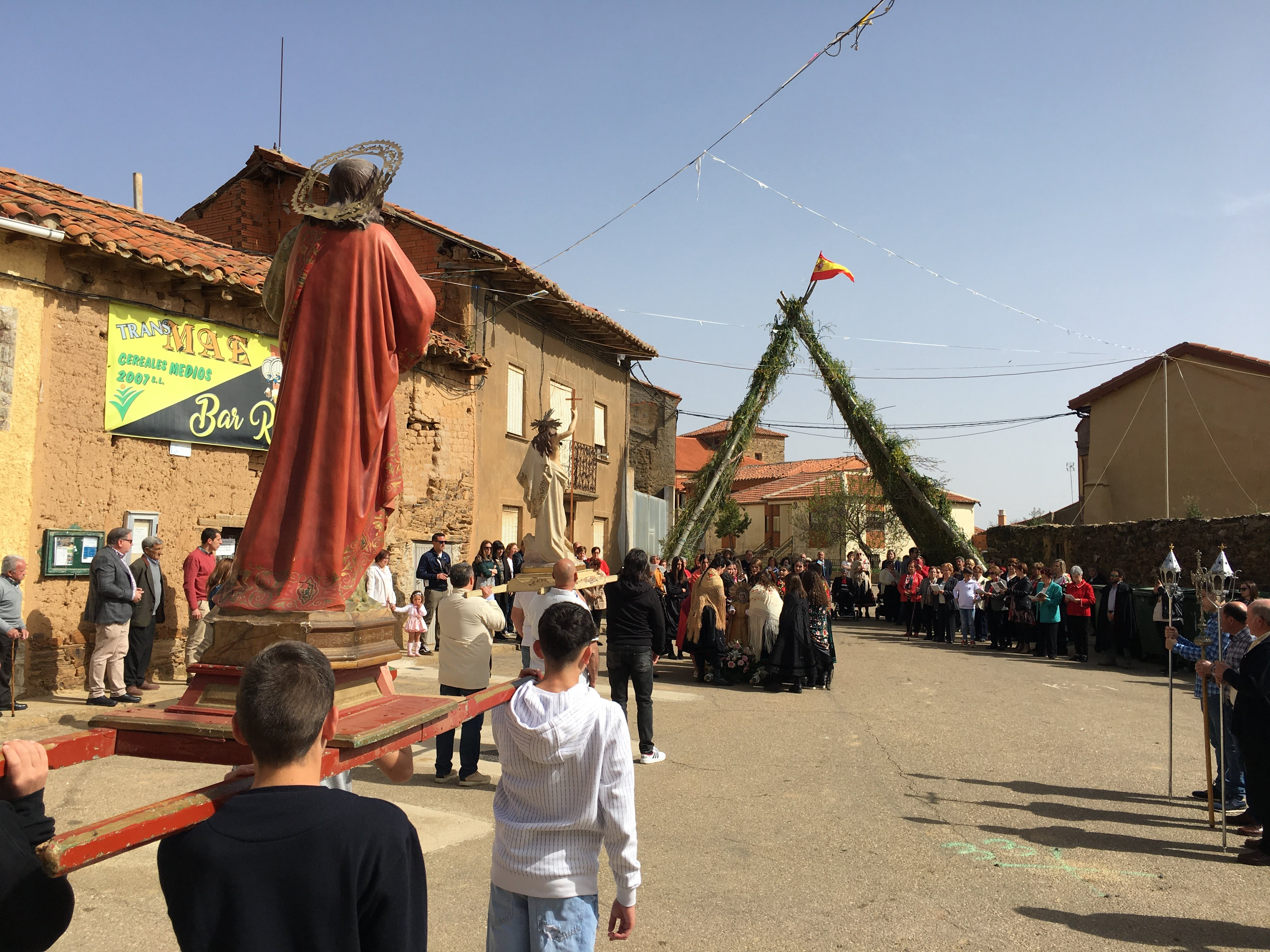
Procession during the Easter of Coomonte.

In the 18th century the historic information is higher in part because the Catastro of Ensenada give us many data about economic life and professions in the town. Including the reference to the traditional wineries owned to domestic use by the families.

== List of mayors ==
List of mayors since 1979 local election
Period	Name	Political party
1979-1982	José Morán Miguélez	UCD
1982-1983	Manuel Ortiz Martínez	UCD
1983-1987	Andrés Peñín Martínez	AP
1987-1991	Magín Rebordinos Panchón	PP
1991-2011	Mateo José Otero Rubio	PP
2011-2023	Magín Rebordinos Morán	PP
2023-	Maximiliano Federico Velicias Baladrón	XCM
