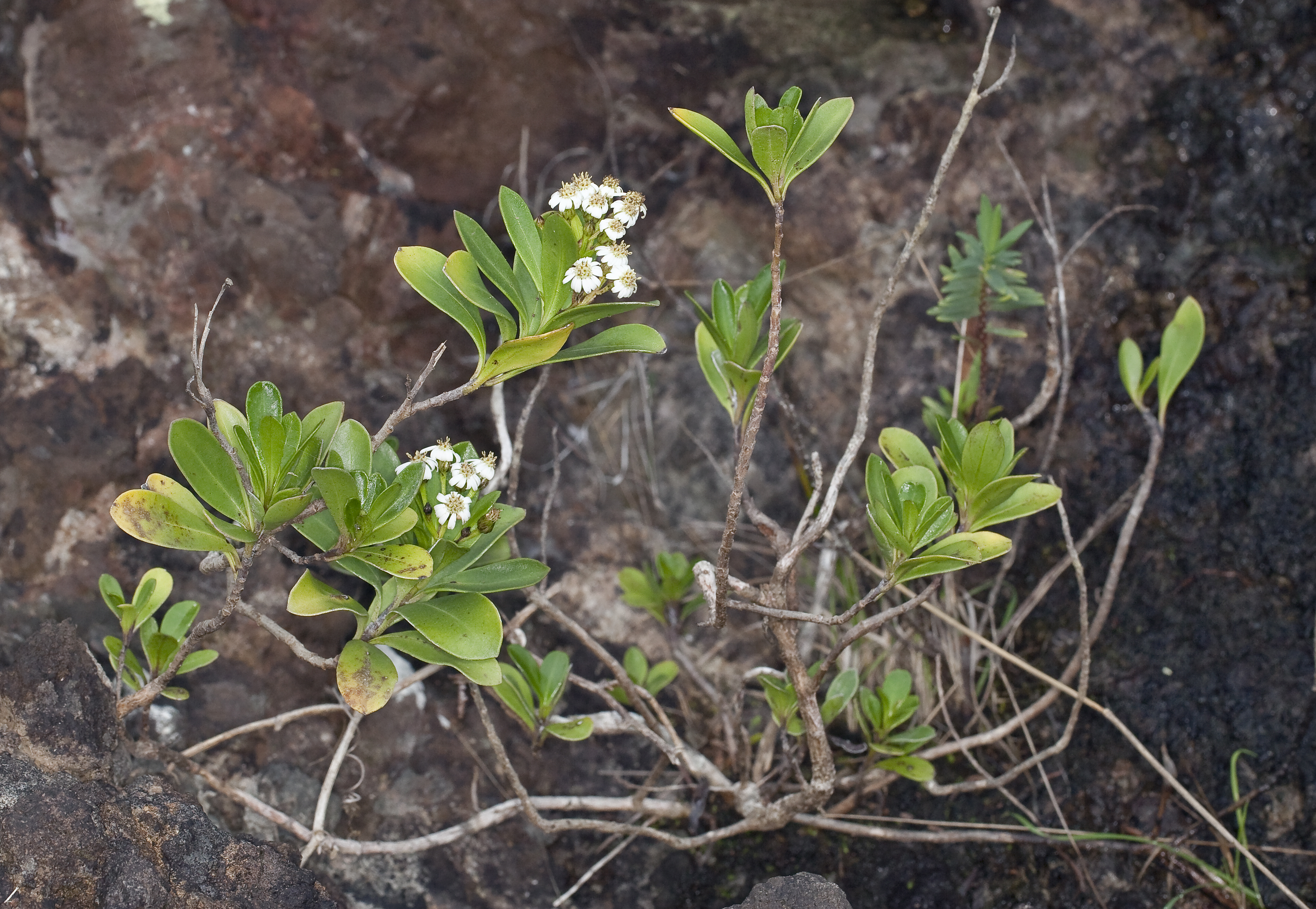

Scientific classification
- Kingdom: Plantae
- Clade: Tracheophytes
- Clade: Angiosperms
- Clade: Eudicots
- Clade: Asterids
- Order: Asterales
- Family: Asteraceae
- Genus: Phaseolaster
- Species: P. praetermissa

Binomial name
- Phaseolaster praetermissa (P.S.Green) G.L.Nesom

Synonyms
- Olearia elliptica subsp. praetermissa P.S.Green; Olearia praetermissa (P.S.Green) A.R.Bean; Phaseolaria praetermissa (P.S.Green) G.L.Nesom

= Phaseolaster praetermissa =

Species of flowering plant

Phaseolaster praetermissa is a flowering plant in the family Asteraceae. It is a subshrub or shrub endemic to Lord Howe Island.

The plant was first described as Olearia elliptica subsp. praetermissa by Peter Shaw Green in 1993. The subspecific epithet means "overlooked", referring to the fact that this distinctive endemic subspecies was long overlooked. In 2020 Guy L. Nesom placed it in the newly-described genus Phaseolaster as a full species, P. praetermissa, after Olearia had been found to be polyphyletic.

== Description ==
It is a shrub, often stunted, growing to 1 m in height. The alternate leaves are usually 25–35 mm long and 10–15 mm wide. The white, daisy-like flowers are 10 mm across, appearing from mid May to early October. The fruits are 2–3 mm long, with numerous bristles.

It is a smaller plant than Phaseolaster elliptica, with between 8 and 15 flowers in the corymb.

== Distribution and habitat ==
The species is endemic to Australia's subtropical Lord Howe Island in the Tasman Sea. There it is found growing in pockets of soil on rocky ledges at higher elevations on Mount Lidgbird.
