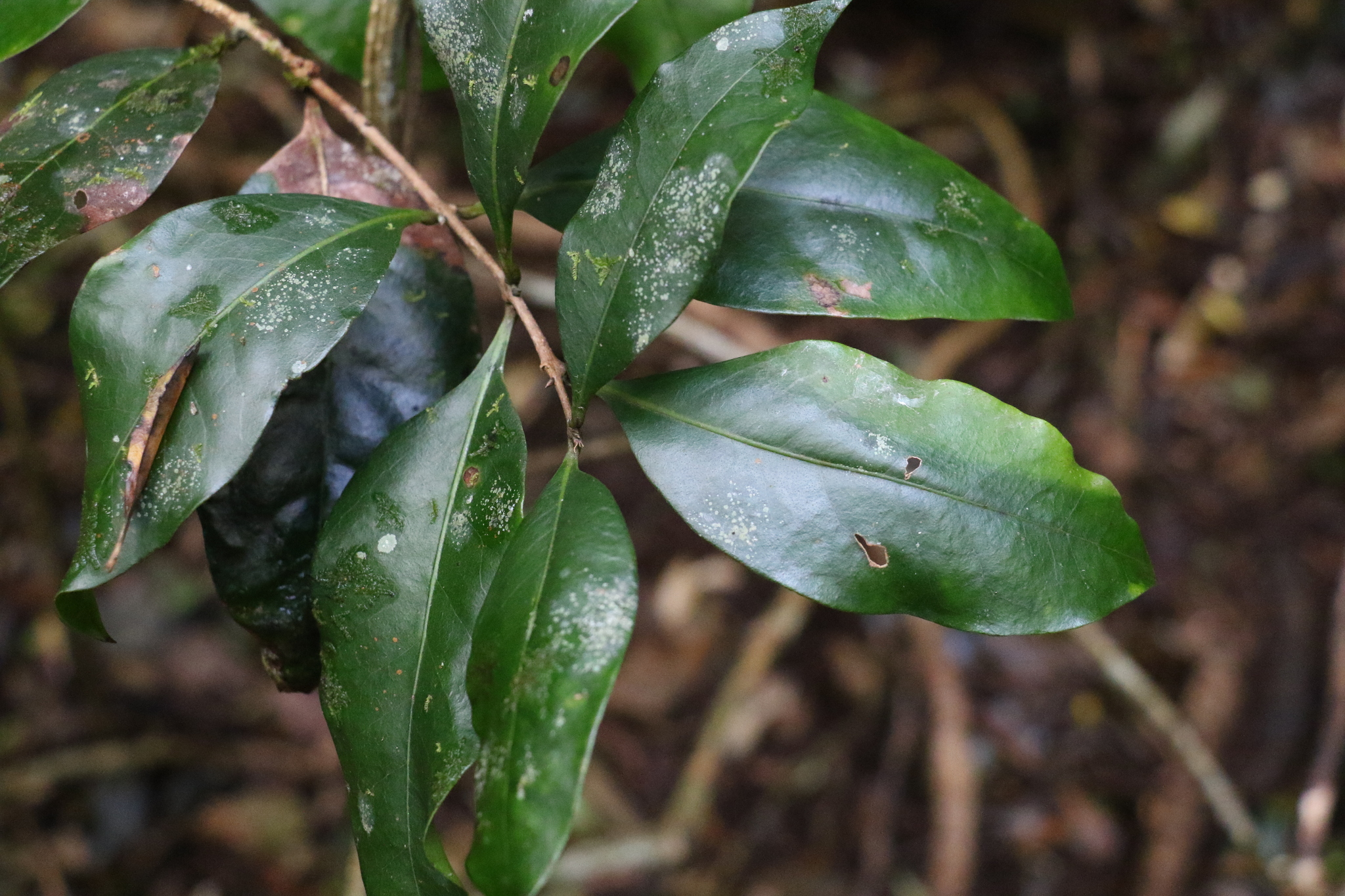

Conservation status
- Least Concern (IUCN 3.1)

Scientific classification
- Kingdom: Plantae
- Clade: Tracheophytes
- Clade: Angiosperms
- Clade: Eudicots
- Clade: Asterids
- Order: Lamiales
- Family: Oleaceae
- Genus: Notelaea
- Species: N. johnsonii

Binomial name
- Notelaea johnsonii P.S.Green, 1968

= Notelaea johnsonii =

Species of flowering plant

Notelaea johnsonii, also known as the veinless mock olive, is a species of flowering plant in the olive family that is endemic to Australia.

== Description ==
The species grows as a shrub or small tree up to about 8 m in height. The oval leaves are 40–120 mm long and 10–50 mm wide. The racemes of 5–11 small bluish-black flowers are 5–8 cm long. The bluish-black oval fruits are 18–20 mm long and 9–10 mm wide.

== Distribution and habitat ==
The species occurs in south-eastern Queensland and north-eastern New South Wales, where it grows in lowland subtropical rainforest on basaltic soils.
