= Notelaea lanceolata =

Notelaea lanceolata may refer to:

- Notelaea lanceolata (Hook.f.) Hong-Wa & Besnard, nom. illeg., synonym of Notelaea neolanceolata Hong-Wa & Besnard
- Notelaea lanceolata Teijsm. & Binn., synonym of Chionanthus montanus Blume
