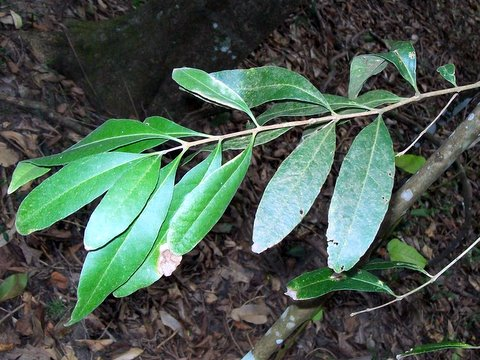
- Large mock-olive on a sand dune behind Seven Mile Beach, New South Wales, Australia
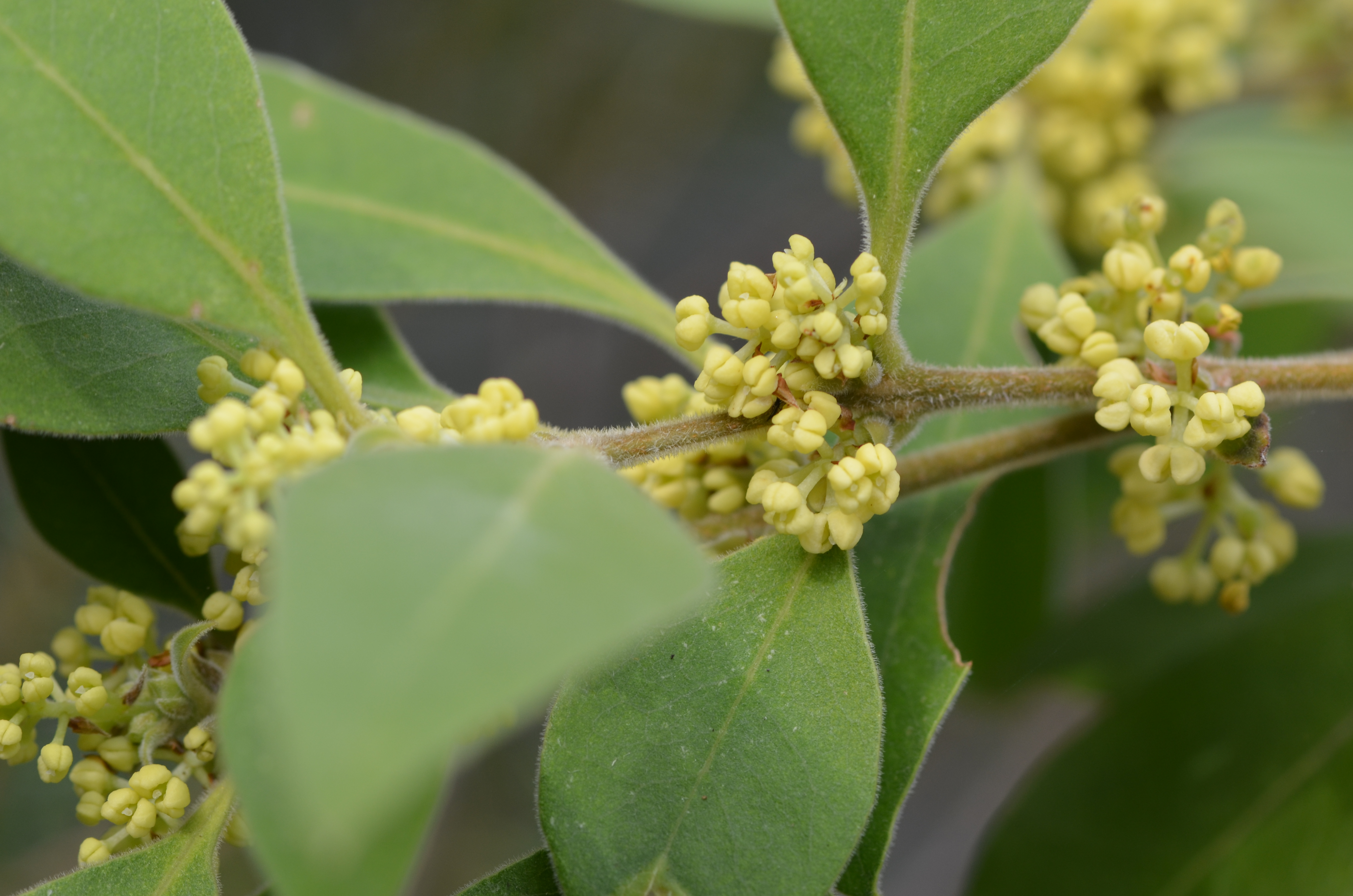
- Flowers: Bangalley Head, Avalon, New South Wales

Scientific classification
- Kingdom: Plantae
- Clade: Tracheophytes
- Clade: Angiosperms
- Clade: Eudicots
- Clade: Asterids
- Order: Lamiales
- Family: Oleaceae
- Genus: Notelaea
- Species: N. longifolia

Binomial name
- Notelaea longifolia Vent.
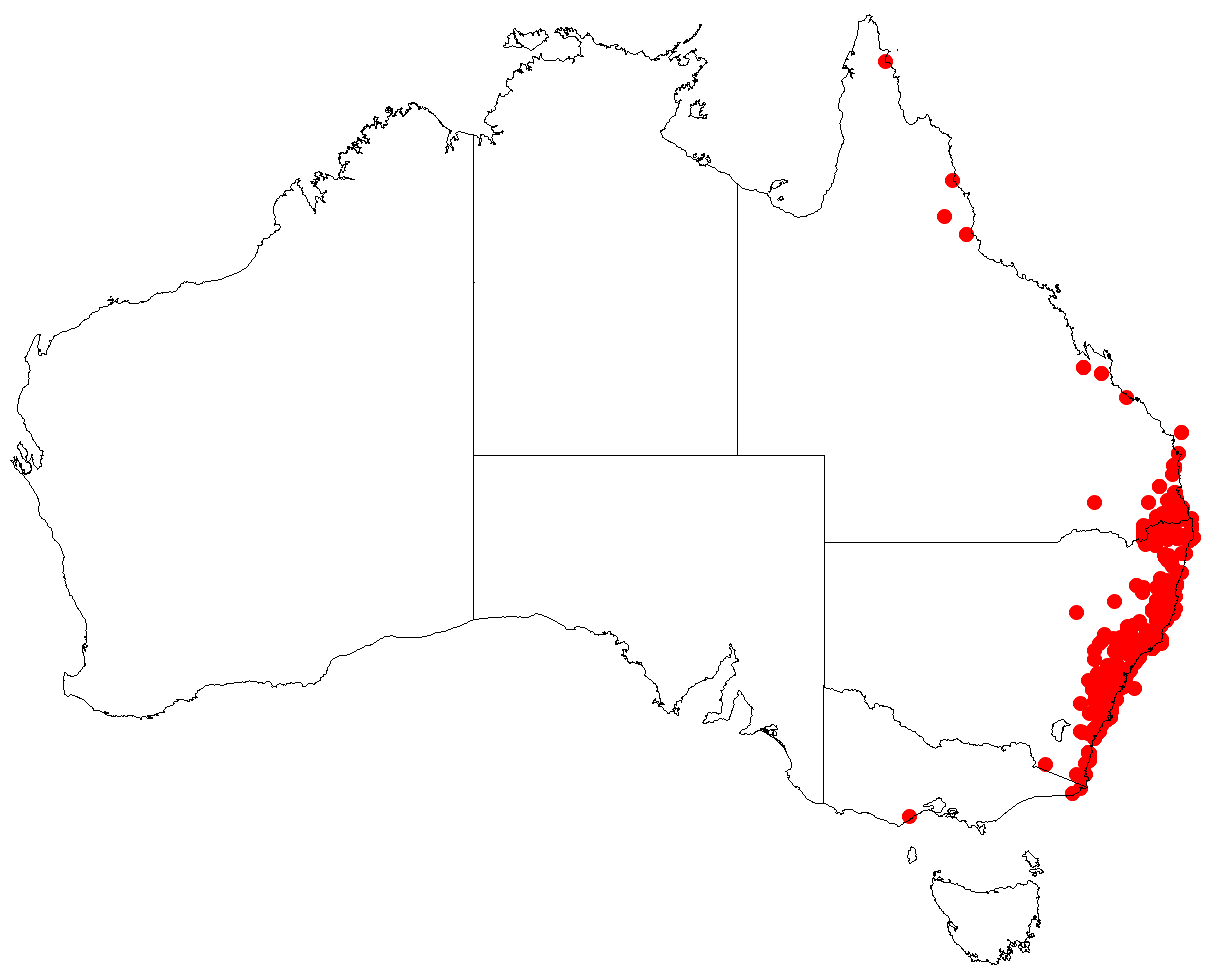
- Collections data from AVH

Synonyms
- Notelaea laurifolia Kunth; Notelaea longifolia var. candolleana Domin; Notelaea longifolia var. decomposita Domin; Notelaea longifolia f. glabra P.S.Green; Notelaea longifolia f. intermedia P.S.Green; Notelaea longifolia var. rigida (Desf.) Domin; Notelaea nervosa (C.F.Gaertn.) Steud.; Notelaea reticulata DC.; Notelaea rigida Desf.; Postuera longifolia (Vent.) Raf.; Rhysospermum ellipticum C.F.Gaertn.; Rhysospermum nervosum C.F.Gaertn.

= Notelaea longifolia =

Large mock-olive

Species of plant

Notelaea longifolia is a very common shrub or small tree in eastern Australia. Occurring in or adjacent to rainforest from Mimosa Rocks National Park (37° S) to Bamaga (11° S) in far north Queensland. Common names include large mock-olive or long-leaved-olive. An attractive ornamental plant.

== Description ==
Usually a shrub is around three metres tall, but occasionally it can be up to nine metres tall, with a trunk diameter of 30 cm. The trunk is often crooked, the crown wide and dense. Grey brown bark is scaly, fissured and hard. Branchlets have small pale lenticels, otherwise pale brown and slender.

=== Leaves ===
Leaves variable in size and shape. Some narrow lanceolate, others lanceolate and some a broad ovate shape. 3 to 16 cm long, 1 to 6 cm wide. Sometimes with a prominent tip, other times blunt. Leaves gradually tapering at the stem end. Dark green above, duller below, stiff and dry to touch. Leaf stalks absent or up to 8 mm long. Leaves veiny, but net veins are irregular and not as distinct as in Notelaea venosa.

=== Flowers and fruit ===
Pale yellow flowers usually form between April and October on racemes at the leaf axils. Racemes are two cm long. Fruit matures from November to March. Being a dark blue or black fleshy drupe 10 to 16 mm long with a single pointed or egg shaped seed, 8 to 12 mm long. Regeneration from fresh seed is slow, taking up to a year.
