= Rostrogordo Pine Forests =

Forests in Melilla, Spain

- Location within Spain
- Type: Nature park
- Location: Melilla, Spain
- Coordinates: 35°18′15″N 02°56′41″W
- Area: 350 hectares (860 acres)
- Manager: Department of Environment and Nature of the Autonomous City of Melilla
- Water: Yes
- Vegetation: Yes
- Parking: Yes

Rostrogordo Pine Forests are pine forests of Aleppo pine, wild olive, ficus benjamina, trachycarpus fortunei, cypress and capsicum annuum, located in Melilla.

== Description ==
The pine forests have multiple water sources, some of them adapted for use by disabled people, and also have a large number of picnic areas, benches and waste bins to make the time we spend there more pleasant and paths to facilitate access. There are two viewing points with beautiful views, a reservoir for irrigation, and a children's playground.
