= Notelaea neglecta =

Scientific classification
- Kingdom: Plantae
- Clade: Tracheophytes
- Clade: Angiosperms
- Clade: Eudicots
- Clade: Asterids
- Order: Lamiales
- Family: Oleaceae
- Genus: Notelaea
- Species: N. neglecta

Binomial name
- Notelaea neglecta P.S.Green, 1968

Species of flowering plant

Notelaea neglecta is a species of flowering plant in the olive family that is endemic to Australia.

== Description ==
The species grows as a shrub to about 2 m (6 ft 7 in) in height. The linear, or lance-shaped, leaves are 25–100 mm (0.98–3.94 in) long and 2–14 mm (0.079–0.551 in) wide. The inflorescences of 7–9 yellow flowers are 1–2 cm (0.39–0.79 in) long. The oval fruits are 5–6 mm (0.20–0.24 in) long and 4–5 mm (0.16–0.20 in) wide.

== Distribution and habitat ==
The species occurs in eastern New South Wales, from Bungonia Gorge to the Capertee area, where it grows in dry sclerophyll forest on limestone or sandstone substrates.
