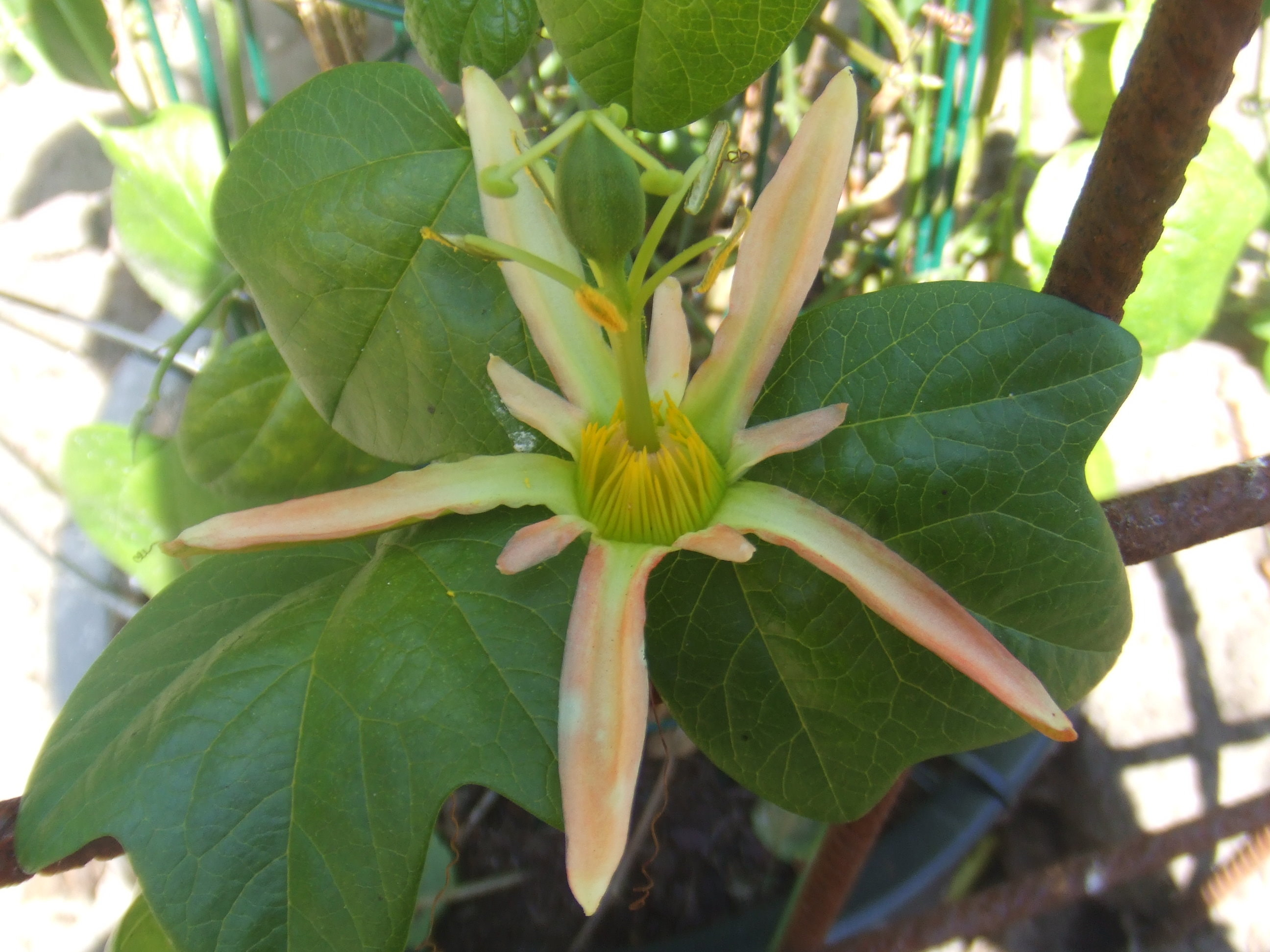
- Flowers
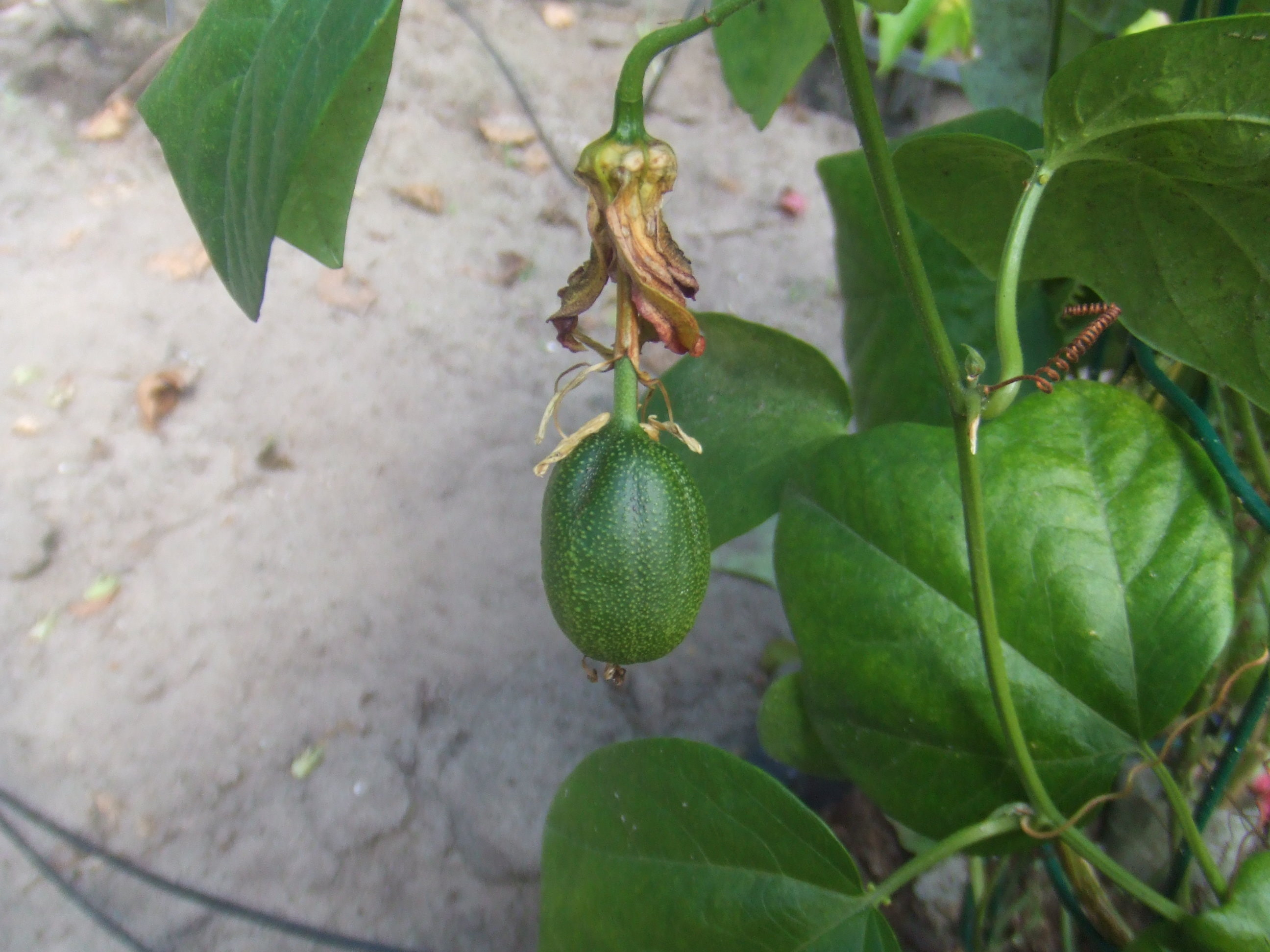
- Unripe native passion fruit

Scientific classification
- Kingdom: Plantae
- Clade: Tracheophytes
- Clade: Angiosperms
- Clade: Eudicots
- Clade: Rosids
- Order: Malpighiales
- Family: Passifloraceae
- Genus: Passiflora
- Species: P. herbertiana

Binomial name
- Passiflora herbertiana Ker Gawl.

= Passiflora herbertiana =

Native passionfruit

Species of vine

Passiflora herbertiana, or native passionfruit, is a widespread climbing twiner native to moist forests on the coast and ranges of eastern Australia. The subspecies P. h. insulae-howei P.S.Green is endemic to Lord Howe Island in the Tasman Sea.

== Description ==
The leaves are usually 3-lobed usually with a slightly hairy undersurface; 6–12 cm long; with petioles mostly 1.5–4 cm long, with 2 glands at the apex. Stipules are linear, mostly 1–3 mm long. The flowers are 6 cm wide and yellow to orange. The following green berry is 50 mm long with pale spots.

The insulae-howei subspecies is similar: the leaves are usually 4–8 cm long and 5–8 cm wide. The solitary, orange-yellow to greenish flowers, 60 mm across, appear from October to March. The oval green fruits are 40–50 mm long; they are edible but sickly-sweet.

== Distribution and habitat ==
The insulae-howei subspecies is endemic to Australia’s subtropical Lord Howe Island in the Tasman Sea, where it is widespread.

== Flammability & building protection ==
Passiflora herbertiana is included in the Tasmanian Fire Service's list of low flammability plants, indicating that it is suitable for growing within a building protection zone.
