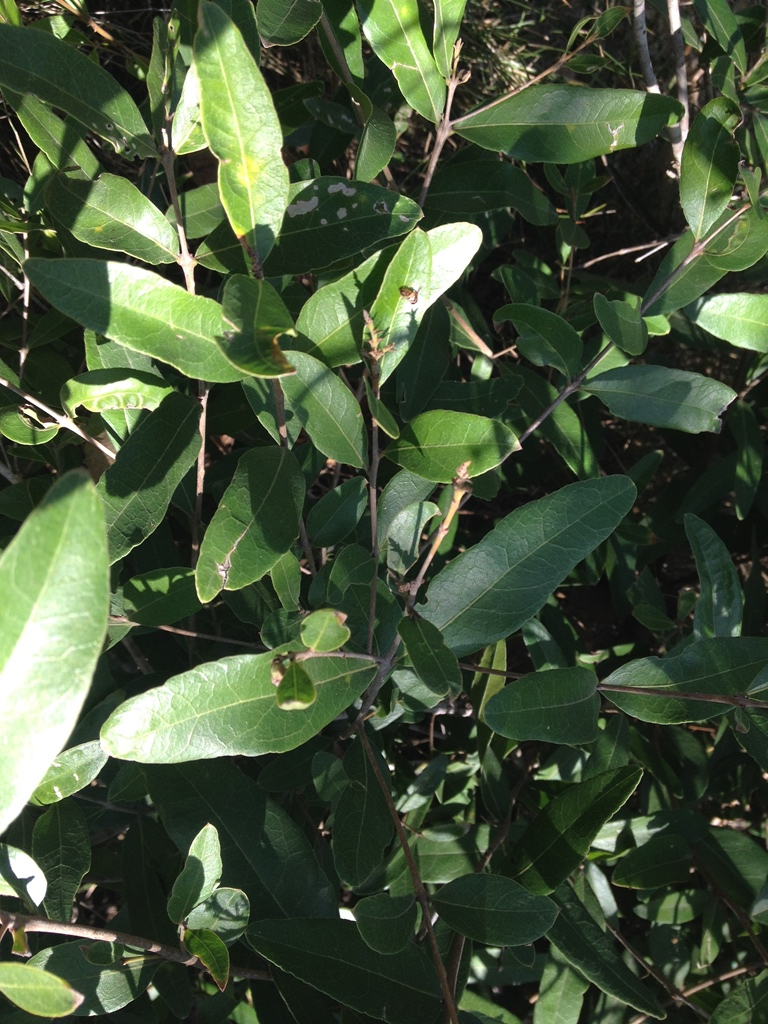

Conservation status
- Critically endangered (EPBC Act)

Scientific classification
- Kingdom: Plantae
- Clade: Tracheophytes
- Clade: Angiosperms
- Clade: Eudicots
- Clade: Asterids
- Order: Lamiales
- Family: Oleaceae
- Genus: Notelaea
- Species: N. ipsviciensis

Binomial name
- Notelaea ipsviciensis W.K.Harris, 2004

= Notelaea ipsviciensis =

Species of flowering plant

Notelaea ipsviciensis, also known as the Cooneana Olive, is a species of flowering plant in the olive family that is endemic to Australia.

== Etymology ==
The specific epithet ipsviciensis refers to the type locality, of which it is a latinisation.

== Description ==
The species grows as a slow-growing, multi-stemmed, lignotuberous, evergreen shrub up to 1–2 m in height. The small flowers are cream-yellow in colour. Each fleshy, purple fruit is about 10 mm wide, enclosing a single seed.

== Distribution and habitat ==
The species is known only from three small populations in the Ipswich area of south-eastern Queensland. It is an understorey plant of open woodland, especially dry, eucalypt-dominated, sclerophyll communities on poor, sandstone-based soils.

== Conservation ==
The species has been listed under Australia's EPBC Act as Critically Endangered. The main threat comes from gross land disturbance from open-cut coal mining and clay extraction, particularly from the dumping of overburden.
