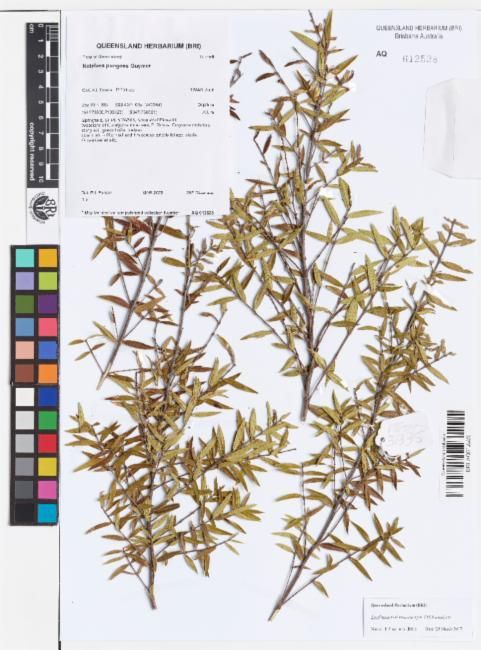
- specimen BRI AQ0612528 (image CC-BY 4.0, Queensland Herbarium)

Scientific classification
- Kingdom: Plantae
- Clade: Tracheophytes
- Clade: Angiosperms
- Clade: Eudicots
- Clade: Asterids
- Order: Lamiales
- Family: Oleaceae
- Genus: Notelaea
- Species: N. pungens

Binomial name
- Notelaea pungens Guymer, 1987

= Notelaea pungens =

Species of flowering plant

Notelaea pungens is a species of flowering plant in the olive family that is endemic to south-eastern Queensland, Australia, which was first described in 1987 by Gordon P. Guymer.
