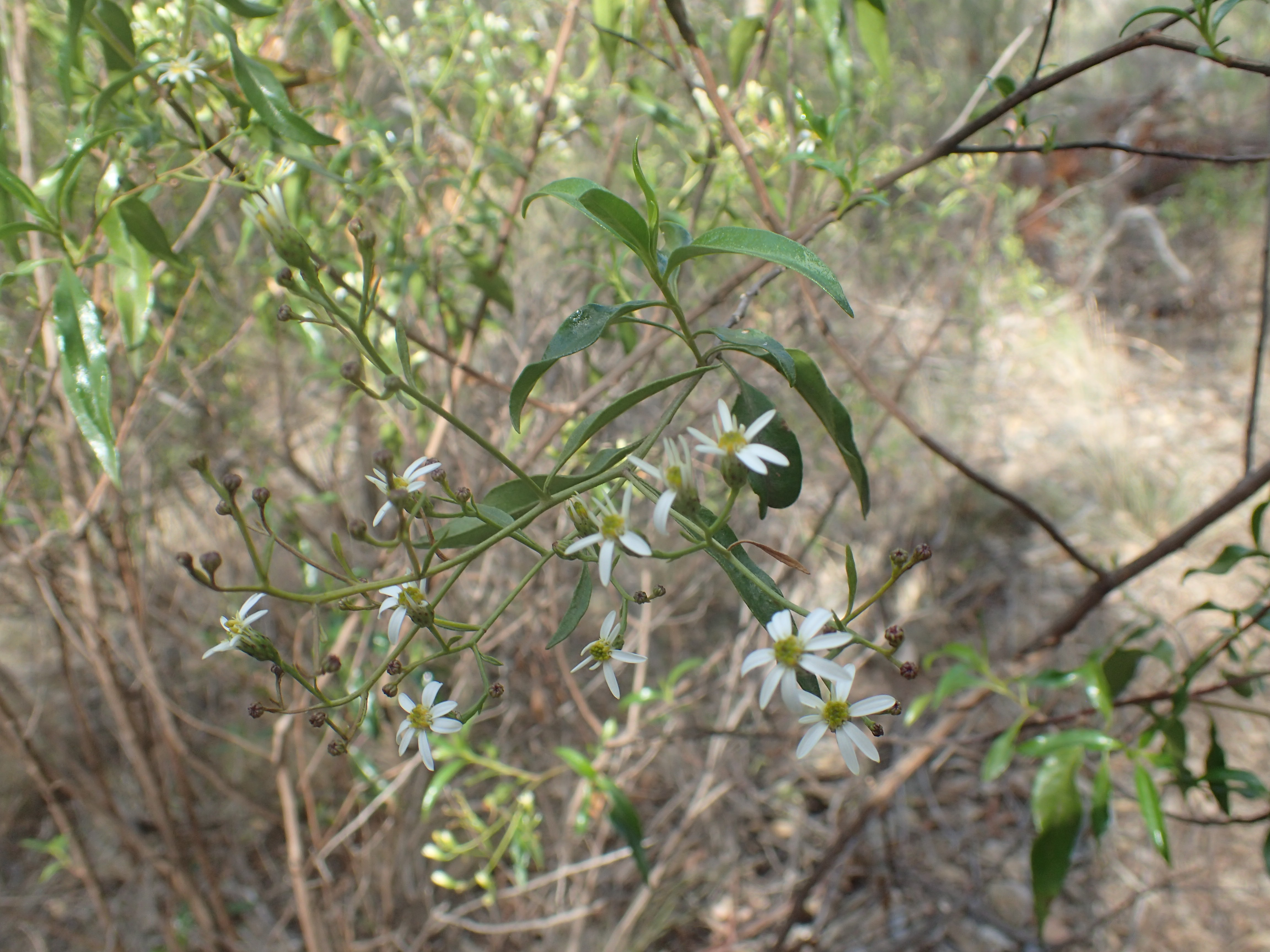
- Olearia elliptica in the Oxley Wild Rivers National Park

Scientific classification
- Kingdom: Plantae
- Clade: Tracheophytes
- Clade: Angiosperms
- Clade: Eudicots
- Clade: Asterids
- Order: Asterales
- Family: Asteraceae
- Genus: Phaseolaster
- Species: P. elliptica

Binomial name
- Phaseolaster elliptica (DC.) G.L.Nesom

Synonyms
- Aster ellipticus A.Cunn. ex DC.; Aster illitus (F.Muell.) F.Muell.; Eurybia illita F.Muell.; Olearia elliptica DC.; Olearia illita F.Muell.; Phaseolaria elliptica (DC.) G.L.Nesom

= Phaseolaster elliptica =

Sticky daisy bush

Species of shrub

Phaseolaster elliptica, commonly known as the sticky daisy bush, is a shrub in the family Asteraceae and is native to New South Wales and Queensland in eastern Australia. It has scattered, sticky leaves and white flowers in summer and autumn.

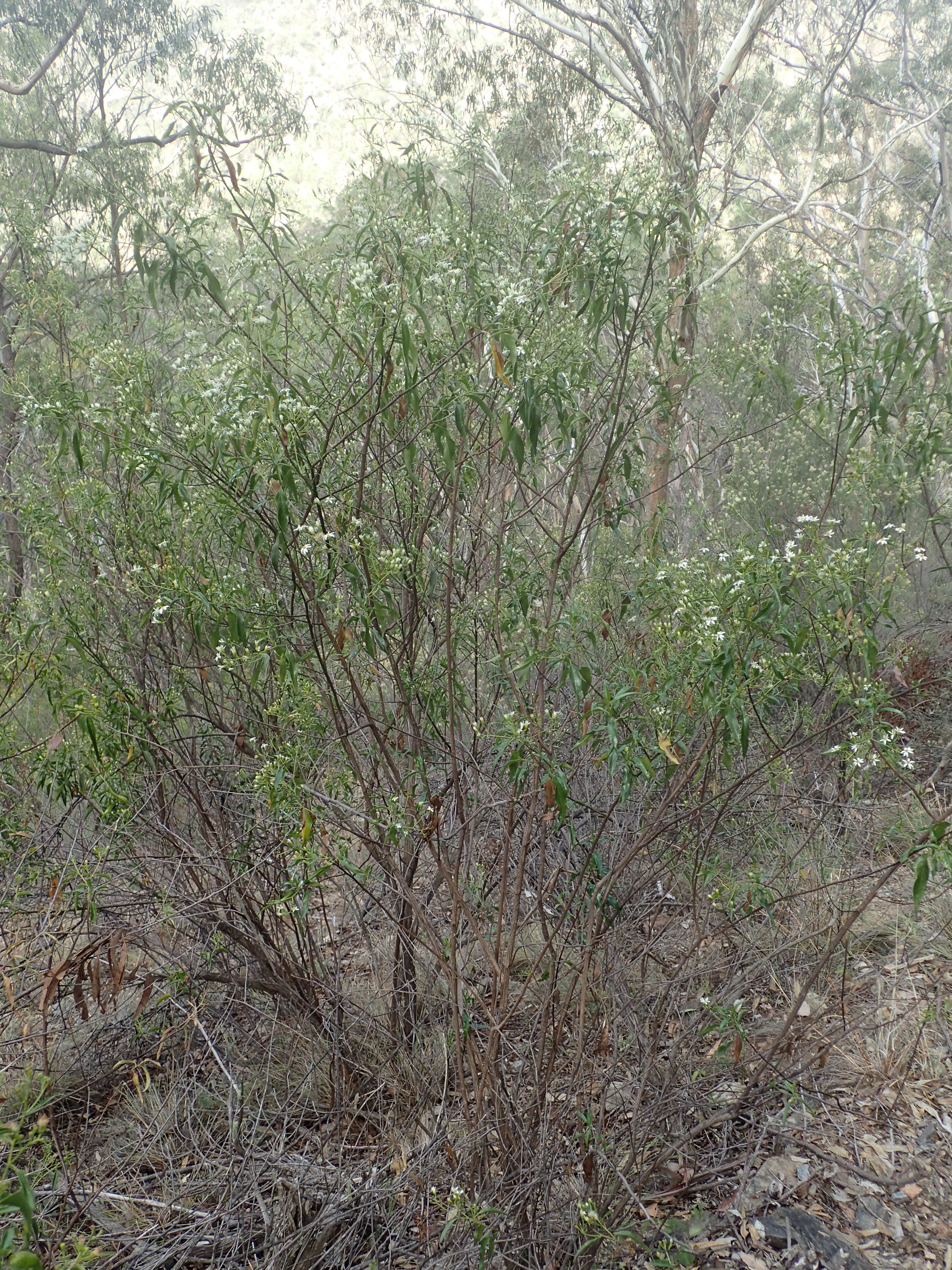
Habit

== Description ==
Phaseolaster elliptica is a shrub that typically grows to a height of 2 m (6 ft 7 in) and has scattered, curved, elliptic leaves 20–115 mm (0.79–4.53 in) long, 5–38 mm (0.20–1.50 in) wide on a petiole up to 12 mm (0.47 in) long. The upper surface of the leaves is sticky and the lower surface is a paler green. The heads or daisy-like "flowers" are arranged in loose groups on the ends of branches on a peduncle up to 12 mm (0.47 in) long and are 11–26 mm (0.43–1.02 in) wide. Each head has 8 to 23 white ray florets surrounding 8 to 30 yellow disc florets. Flowering occurs between November and May and the fruit are bristly achenes.

== Taxonomy and naming ==
The species was first formally described as Olearia elliptica by Augustin Pyramus de Candolle in 1836, who published the description in his 17-volume treatise, Prodromus Systematis Naturalis Regni Vegetabilis. The specific epithet (elliptica) is a Latin word meaning "a defective circle" or "an ellipse".

In 1993, Peter Shaw Green described two subspecies of O. elliptica that were accepted by the Australian Plant Census: O. elliptica subsp. elliptica in eastern Australia and O. elliptica subsp. praetermissa, which is endemic to Lord Howe Island. In 2020 Guy L. Nesom placed the species in the newly-described genus Phaseolaster as P. elliptica after Olearia had been found to be polyphyletic, and raised subsp. praetermissa to a full species as P. praetermissa.

== Distribution and habitat ==
The species occurs from Berry northwards along central and eastern New South Wales to the Queensland border. It is found in areas of annual rainfall of over 900 mm in the Sydney Basin.

== Use in horticulture ==
Sticky daisy bush adapts readily to cultivation, preferring acidic soils in part shade or sun.
