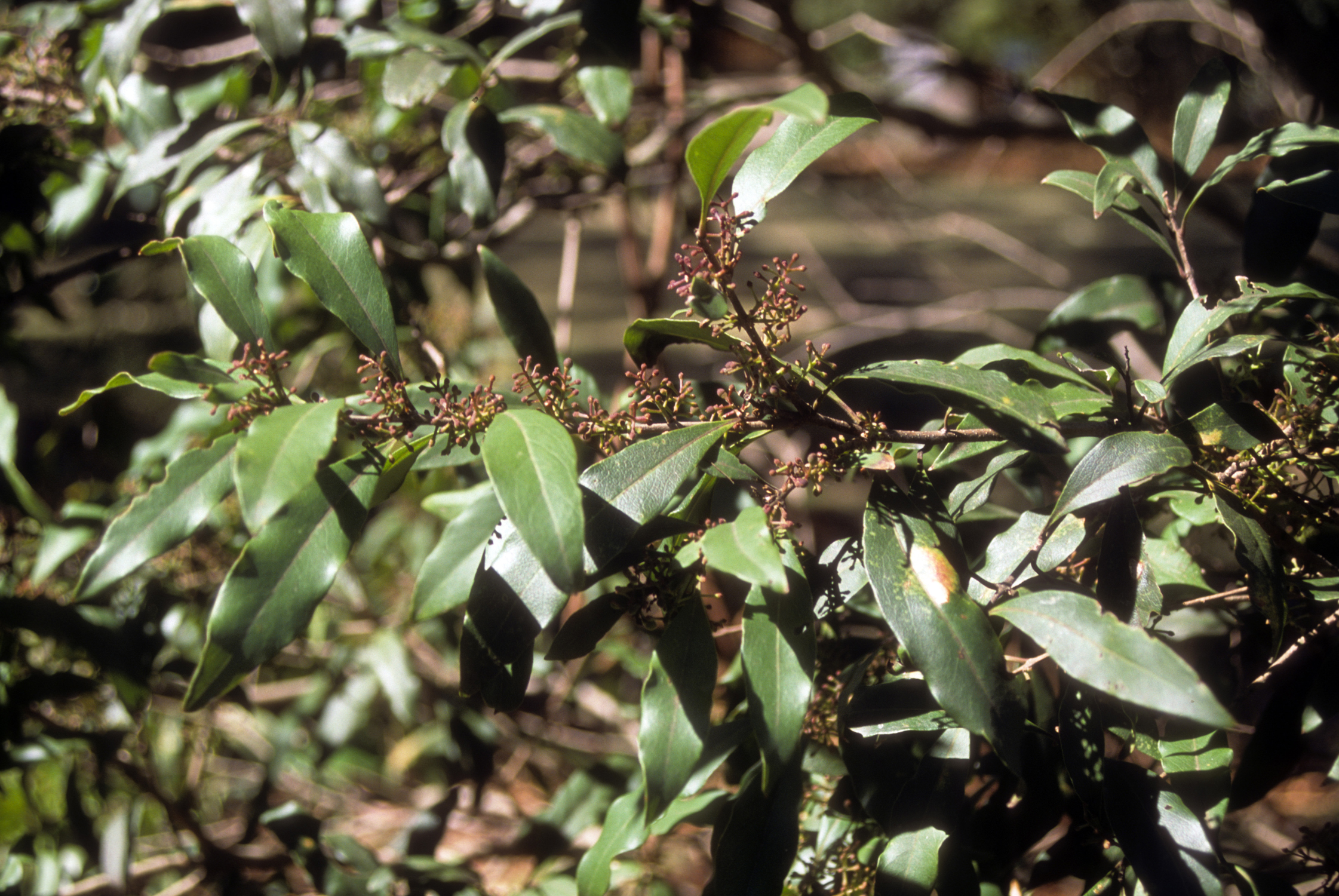
- Notelaea longifolia

Scientific classification
- Kingdom: Plantae
- Clade: Tracheophytes
- Clade: Angiosperms
- Clade: Eudicots
- Clade: Asterids
- Order: Lamiales
- Family: Oleaceae
- Tribe: Oleeae
- Subtribe: Oleinae
- Genus: Notelaea; Vent.

Synonyms
- Gymnelaea (Endl.) Spach; Nestegis Raf.; Noteaela Macarthur & C.Moore orth. var.; Notelaea sect. Eunotelaea Knobl. nom. inval.; Postuera Raf.; Rhysospermum C.F.Gaertn.

= Notelaea =

Genus of flowering plants

Notelaea is a genus of flowering plants in the family Oleaceae. It includes 21 species native to eastern Australia and Tasmania, New Zealand, the Norfolk Islands, New Caledonia, and the Hawaiian Islands. Plants in the genus Notelaea are shrubs or small trees with leaves arranged in opposite pairs, flowers arranged in racemes in leaf axils with small sepals and 2 pairs of petals joined in pairs, 2 stamens and an ovary with 2 ovules with a 2-lobed stigma.

== Description ==
Plants in the genus Notelaea are shrubs or small trees with simple, leathery leaves arranged in opposite pairs. The flowers are bisexual arranged in racemes in leaf axils, sometimes reduced to sessile clusters. The sepals are small, joined at the base with 4 triangular lobes and the 4 petals are broadly egg-shaped and joined in pairs at the base of the stamens. Each flower has 2 stamens with a flask-shaped ovary with 2 locules each with 2 ovules. The style is short with a 2-lobed stigma and the fruit is a dupe containing a single seed.

== Taxonomy ==
The genus Notelaea was first formally described in 1803 by Étienne Pierre Ventenat in Description des plantes nouvelles et peu connues, cultivées dans le jardin de J.-M. Cels, and the first species he described (the type species) was Notelaea longifolia. The genus name (Noteleia) is formed from two Greek words, notos and elaia, meaning southern olive.

Based on an analysis of phylogenomic data from plastid DNA sequences and three nuclear regions, Dupin et al. discovered that the related Pacific genus Nestegis was paraphyletic, and that genus Osmanthus was polyphyletic with the inclusion of the New Caledonian species in section Notosmanthus, and in 2022 they consolidated Nestegis and Osmanthus sect. Notosmanthus into Notelaea.

== Species ==
The following is a list of species of Notolaea accepted by the Plants of the World Online as March 2025:

- Notelaea apetala (Vahl) Hong-Wa & Besnard – coastal maire or broad-leaved maire – New Zealand and Norfolk Island
- Notelaea austrocaledonica Vieill. – New Caledonia
- Notelaea crassifolia (Guillaumin) Pillon & J.Dupin – New Caledonia
- Notelaea cunninghamii (Hook.f.) Hong-Wa & Besnard – black maire – New Zealand
- Notelaea cymosa Guillaumin – northwestern and central New Caledonia
- Notelaea ipsviciensis W.K.Harris – Cooneana olive – southeastern Queensland
- Notelaea johnsonii P.S.Green – veinless mock-olive – southeastern Queensland and northeastern New South Wales
- Notelaea ligustrina Vent. – privet mock-olive, native olive, doral or silkwood – southeastern New South Wales, Victoria, and Tasmania
- Notelaea linearis Benth. – native olive – southeastern Queensland and northeastern New South Wales
- Notelaea lloydii Guymer – Lloyd's olive – southeastern Queensland
- Notelaea longifolia Vent. – large mock-olive, long-leaved olive – eastern New South Wales
- Notelaea microcarpa R.Br. – gorge mock-olive, velvet mock-olive, small-fruited mock-olive – eastern Queensland and eastern New South Wales
- Notelaea montana (Hook.f.) Hong-Wa & Besnard – narrow-leaved maire – New Zealand
- Notelaea monticola Schltr. – central and southeastern New Caledonia
- Notelaea neglecta P.S.Green – central-eastern New South Wales
- Notelaea neolanceolata Hong-Wa & Besnard – white maire – New Zealand
- Notelaea ovata R.Br. – forest olive – southeastern Queensland and eastern New South Wales
- Notelaea punctata R.Br. – large mock-olive – eastern Queensland
- Notelaea pungens Guymer – southeastern Queensland
- Notelaea sandwicensis (A.Gray) Hong-Wa & Besnard – Hawai'i olive or olopua – Hawaiian Islands
- Notelaea venosa F.Muell. – large mock-olive, smooth mock-olive – southeastern Queensland and eastern Victoria
