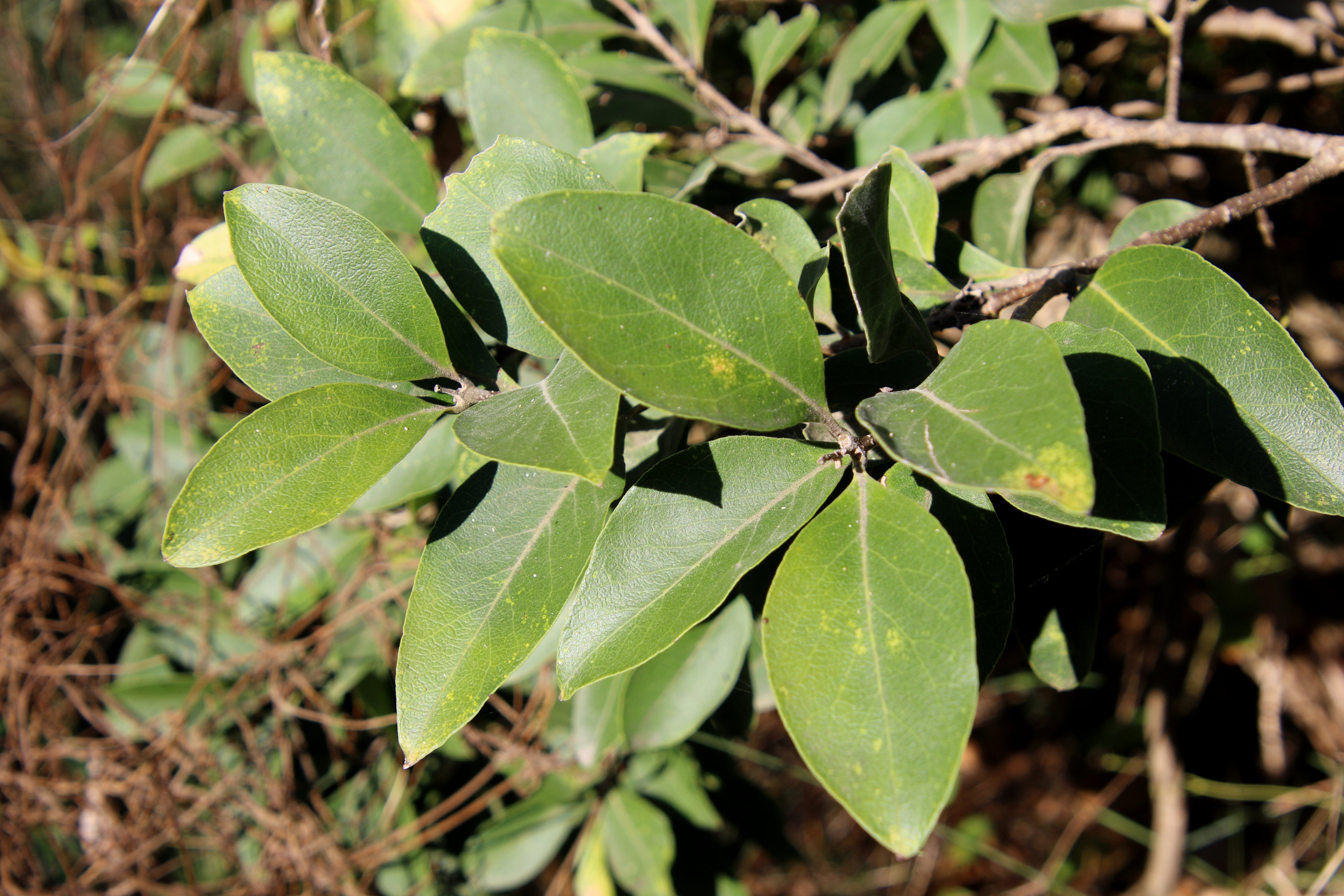
- Turimetta Beach, Sydney

Scientific classification
- Kingdom: Plantae
- Clade: Tracheophytes
- Clade: Angiosperms
- Clade: Eudicots
- Clade: Asterids
- Order: Lamiales
- Family: Oleaceae
- Genus: Notelaea
- Species: N. ovata

Binomial name
- Notelaea ovata R.Br.

Synonyms
- Notelaea longifolia var. ovata (R. Br.) Domin

= Notelaea ovata =

Species of tree

Notelaea ovata is a shrub in the olive family, found in eastern Australia. Growing up to a metre high, found mostly in coastal districts north from Narooma. This plant was first mentioned in the scientific literature in 1810, in the Prodromus Florae Novae Hollandiae, authored by Scottish botanist, Robert Brown. One of the many plants listed with a type as "(J.) v.v.". Brown collected samples at Port Jackson in the early years of the 19th century.
