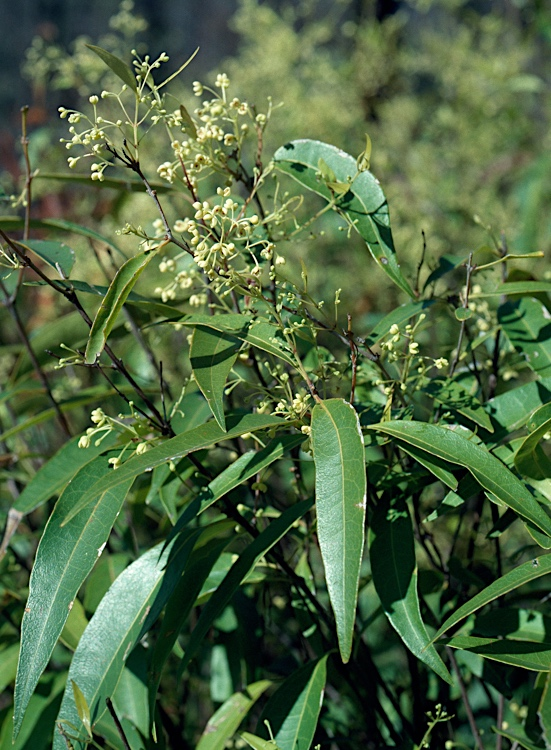

Scientific classification
- Kingdom: Plantae
- Clade: Tracheophytes
- Clade: Angiosperms
- Clade: Eudicots
- Clade: Asterids
- Order: Lamiales
- Family: Oleaceae
- Genus: Notelaea
- Species: N. punctata

Binomial name
- Notelaea punctata R.Br., 1810

= Notelaea punctata =

Species of flowering plant

Notelaea punctata, also known as the large mock-olive, is a species of flowering plant in the olive family that is native to eastern Queensland, Australia.
