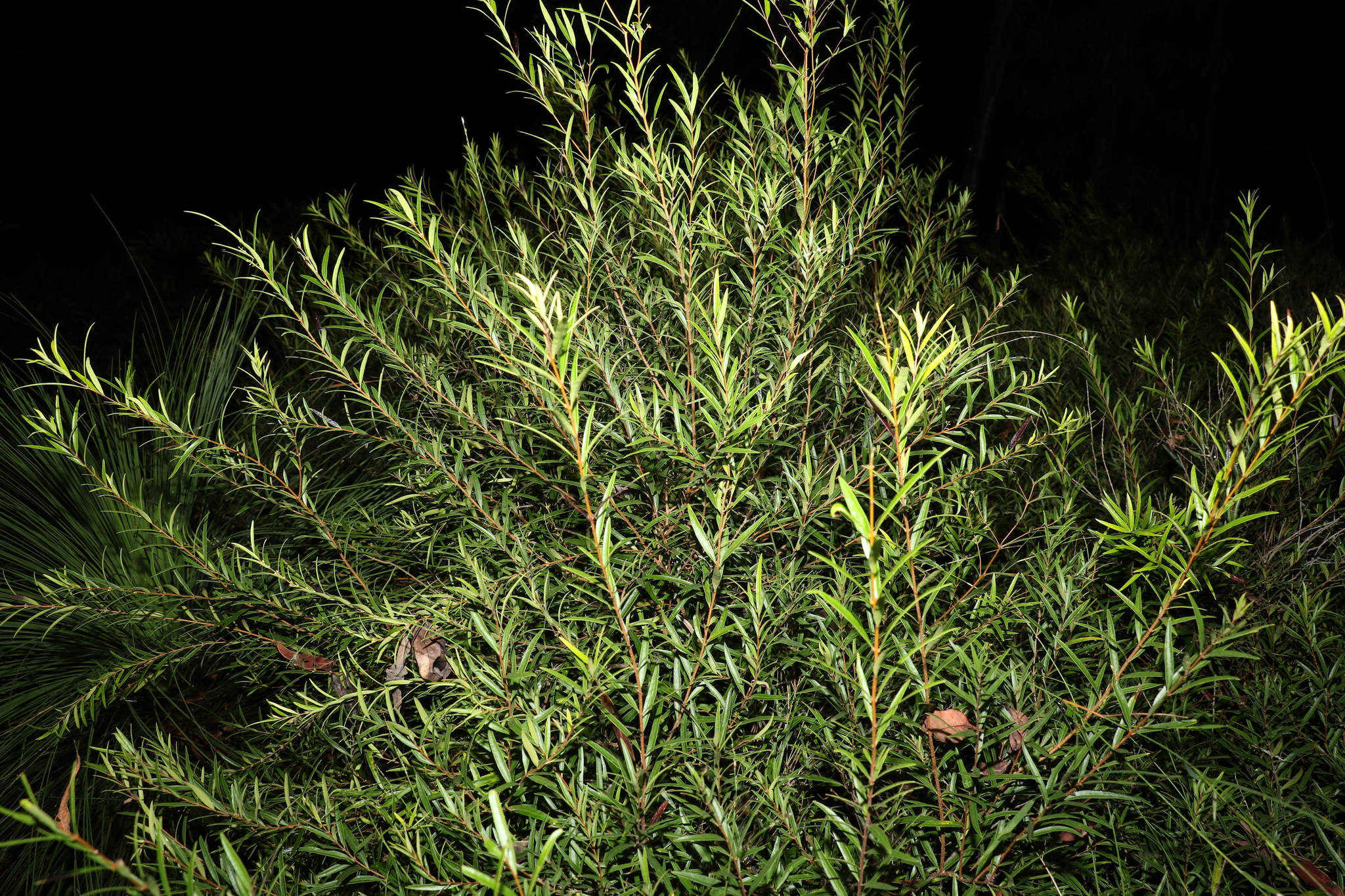

Scientific classification
- Kingdom: Plantae
- Clade: Tracheophytes
- Clade: Angiosperms
- Clade: Eudicots
- Clade: Asterids
- Order: Lamiales
- Family: Oleaceae
- Genus: Notelaea
- Species: N. linearis

Binomial name
- Notelaea linearis Benth., 1868

= Notelaea linearis =

Species of flowering plant

Notelaea linearis, also known as the native olive, is a species of flowering plant in the olive family that is endemic to Australia.

== Description ==
The species grows as a shrub to about 2 m in height. The linear, or lance-shaped, leaves are 20–70 mm long and 7–12 mm wide. The inflorescences of about four pale yellow flowers are 4–10 cm long. The white or blue oval fruits are 5–7 mm long and 4–5 mm wide.

== Distribution and habitat ==
The species occurs in north-eastern New South Wales and south-eastern Queensland, where it grows in dry sclerophyll forest and heathy scrub, usually on a granite substrate.
