= Phaseolaster =

Scientific classification
- Kingdom: Plantae
- Clade: Tracheophytes
- Clade: Angiosperms
- Clade: Eudicots
- Clade: Asterids
- Order: Asterales
- Family: Asteraceae
- Subfamily: Asteroideae
- Tribe: Astereae
- Subtribe: Brachyscominae
- Genus: Phaseolaster; G.L.Nesom

Synonyms
- Phaseolaria G.L.Nesom

Genus of flowering plants

Phaseolaster is a genus of flowering plants in the family Asteraceae. It includes three species native to Queensland and New South Wales in eastern Australia and to Lord Howe Island.

- Phaseolaster elliptica (DC.) G.L.Nesom
- Phaseolaster fulgens (A.R.Bean) G.L.Nesom
- Phaseolaster praetermissa (P.S.Green) G.L.Nesom
