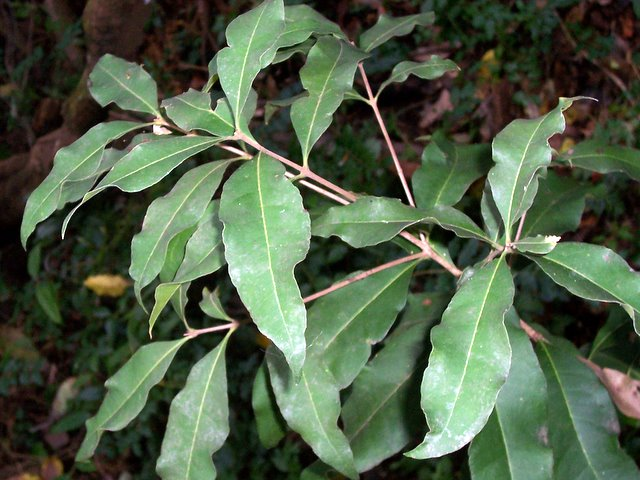
- Veined mock-olive at Roseville Chase, Australia

Scientific classification
- Kingdom: Plantae
- Clade: Tracheophytes
- Clade: Angiosperms
- Clade: Eudicots
- Clade: Asterids
- Order: Lamiales
- Family: Oleaceae
- Genus: Notelaea
- Species: N. venosa

Binomial name
- Notelaea venosa F.Muell.

= Notelaea venosa =

Veined mock-olive

Species of tree

Notelaea venosa is a very common shrub or small tree in eastern Australia. Occurring in or adjacent to rainforest from Lakes Entrance, Victoria (37° S) to Cunninghams Gap (27° S) in south eastern Queensland. Common names include veined mock-olive, smooth mock-olive, large-leaved mock-olive and large mock-olive. Often seen in the bushland areas in Sydney.

== Description ==
Usually a bushy shrub to 3 metres tall. But occasionally it be surprisingly large, up to 16 metres tall and a trunk diameter of 25 cm. The trunk is often crooked, without buttresses of flanges. Grey brown bark is fairly smooth, but sometimes with some flaky irregularities. Branchlets have small white lenticels, otherwise pale brown, thin and round in cross section.

=== Leaves ===
Dull green, stiff, thick and superficially resembling eucalyptus leaves. Leaves prominently veiny on both sides. Leaf edges entire, though sometimes slightly wavy edged. Net veins regular and uniform in pattern, contrasting to the similar Notelaea longifolia which are more irregular and less easily seen.

Leaves 6 to 16 cm long, 2 to 4 cm wide, lanceolate to ovate lanceolate in shape. Leaf stem 5 to 15 mm long. Oil dots present but difficult to distinguish.

=== Flowers and fruit ===
Greenish white or yellow flowers usually form between October and December on racemes. Racemes are 1 to 3 cm long with five to nine flowers. Fruit matures from April to September, but can mature at any time of the year. A dark blue or black fleshy drupe 10 to 15 mm long with a single pointed seed, 8 to 12 mm long. Regeneration from fresh seed is slow.
