= Villaferrueña =

Coordinates: 42°06′N 5°51′W

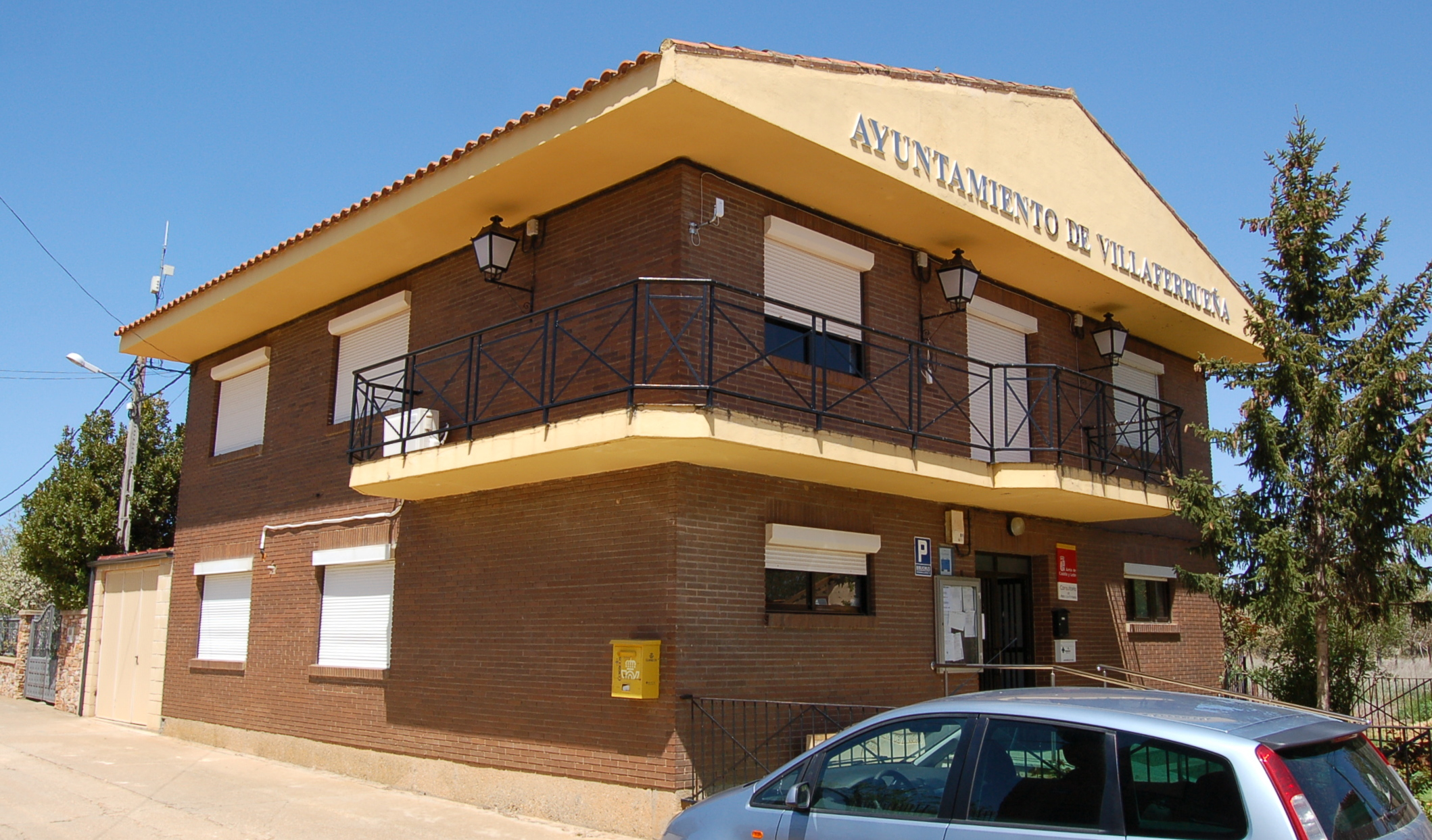

- Flag Coat of arms
- Interactive map of Villaferrueña
- Country: Spain
- Autonomous community: Castile and León
- Province: Zamora
- Municipality: Villaferrueña

Area
  - Total: 20 km^{2} (7.7 sq mi)

Population (2025-01-01)
  - Total: 105
  - Density: 5.3/km^{2} (14/sq mi)
- Time zone: UTC+1 (CET)
  - Summer (DST): UTC+2 (CEST)
- Website: Official website

Villaferrueña (Spanish pronunciation: [biʎafeˈrweɲa]) is a municipality located in the province of Zamora, Castile and León, Spain. According to the 2004 census (INE), the municipality has a population of 153 inhabitants.
