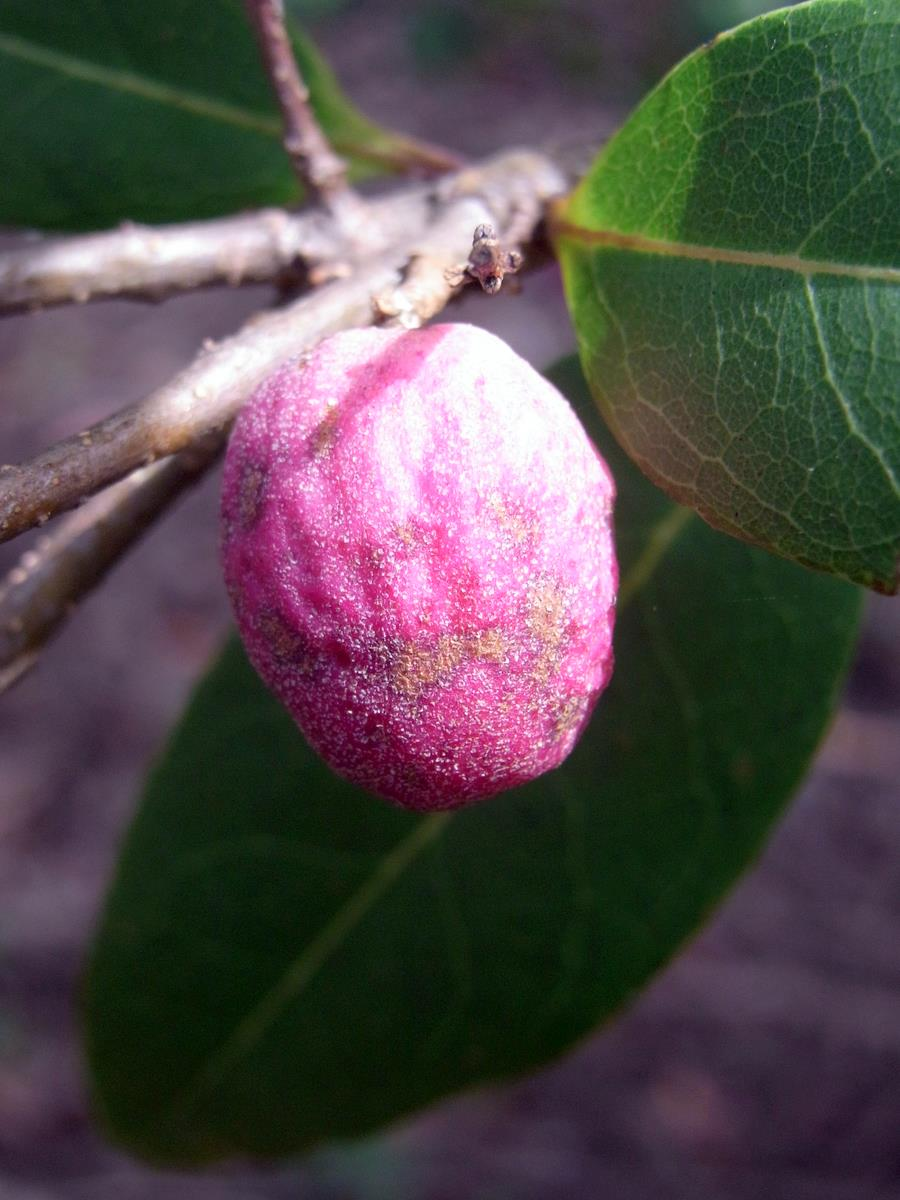
- Mount Imlay, Australia

Conservation status
- Least Concern (IUCN 3.1)

Scientific classification
- Kingdom: Plantae
- Clade: Tracheophytes
- Clade: Angiosperms
- Clade: Eudicots
- Clade: Asterids
- Order: Lamiales
- Family: Oleaceae
- Genus: Notelaea
- Species: N. ligustrina

Binomial name
- Notelaea ligustrina Vent.

Synonyms
- Nestegis ligustrina (Vent.) L.A.S.Johnson

= Notelaea ligustrina =

Privet mock olive

Species of tree

Notelaea ligustrina, known as the privet mock olive, native olive, doral or silkwood, is a plant in the olive family, found in southeastern Australia. It is known to grow in and near rainforests south of Monga National Park in New South Wales, and into Victoria and the island state of Tasmania. The specific epithet ligustrina refers to the Privet, which it resembles.

It is a shrub or small tree capable of growing up to 16 metres tall, with a trunk diameter of 80 cm. It features dull, hairless leaves that are 3 to 10 cm long and 10 to 25 mm wide. Leaf stems are purple in colour and 2 to 5 mm long. From January to April, greenish-yellow flowers form racemes extending from the leaf axils . Relatively large fruit mature from summer to Easter, and are up to 10 mm in diameter. These fruits are generally a shade of pink, varying from white to dark purple. Though edible and often heavy yielding, the fruit have a large pip and a strong, bitter taste which gives them little food value.
