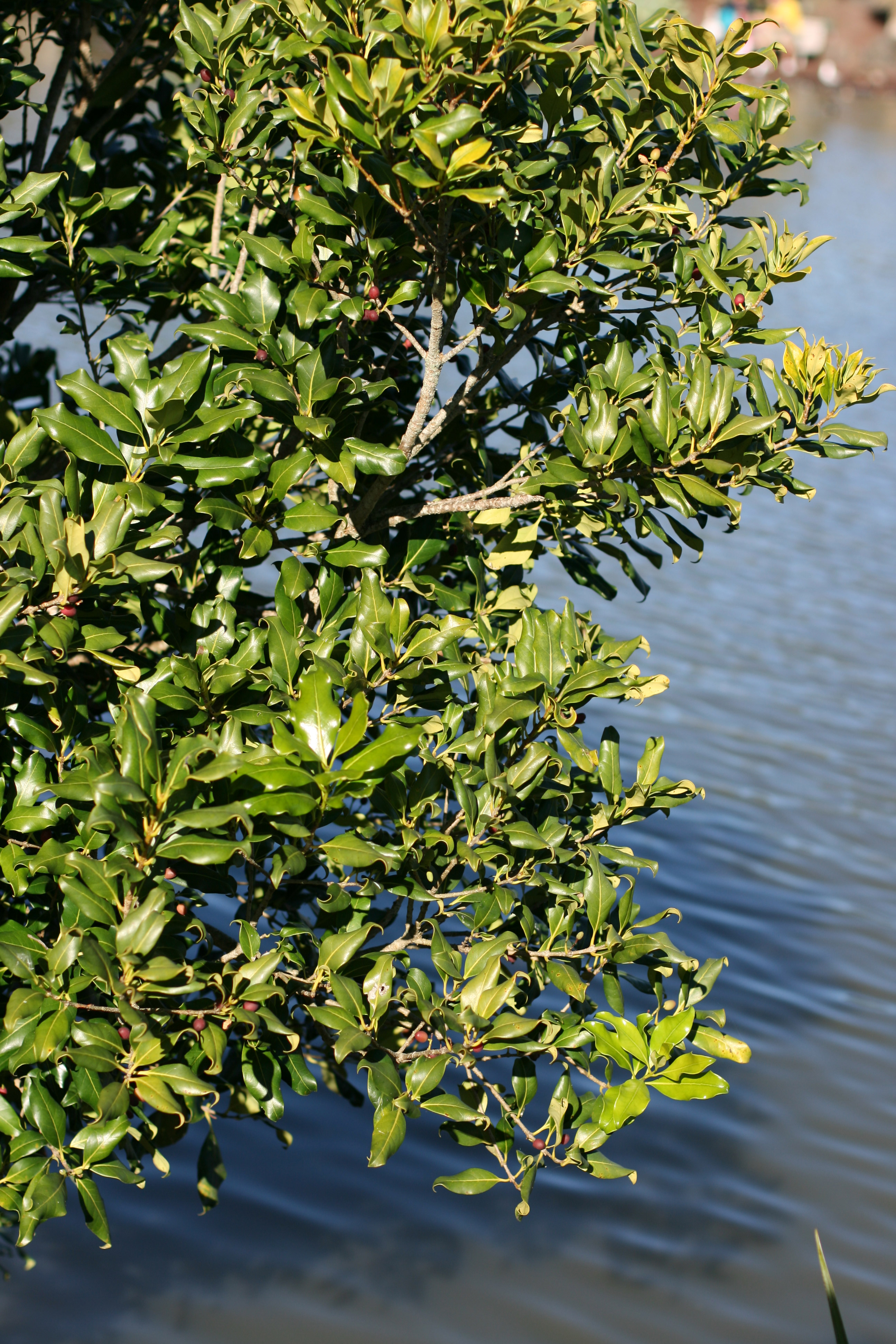

Scientific classification
- Kingdom: Plantae
- Clade: Tracheophytes
- Clade: Angiosperms
- Clade: Eudicots
- Clade: Asterids
- Order: Lamiales
- Family: Oleaceae
- Genus: Notelaea
- Species: N. apetala

Binomial name
- Notelaea apetala (Vahl) Hong-Wa & Besnard

Synonyms
- Gymnelaea apetala (Vahl) L.A.S.Johnson; Nestegis apetala (Vahl) L.A.S.Johnson; Nestegis elliptica Raf.; Olea apetala Vahl.; Olea endlicheri F.Muell.

= Notelaea apetala =

Coastal maire, ironwood

Species of tree

Notelaea apetala is a small tree native to northeastern New Zealand and to Norfolk Island. The common names in New Zealand are coastal maire or broad-leaved maire. On Norfolk Island, the common name is ironwood. The species name apetala refers to the lack of petals on the flowers.

== Distribution ==
In New Zealand N. apetala grows on the North Island mainland on rocky headlands around Whangarei Heads and at the Bay of Islands. It is also found on northern offshore islands including the Hen and Chickens Islands, Great Barrier Island, Little Barrier Island, and the Poor Knights Islands. It tends to be rare on islands with rats. On Norfolk Island, it is common on Mt Pitt, and in forested areas generally, but is less common elsewhere.

== Description ==
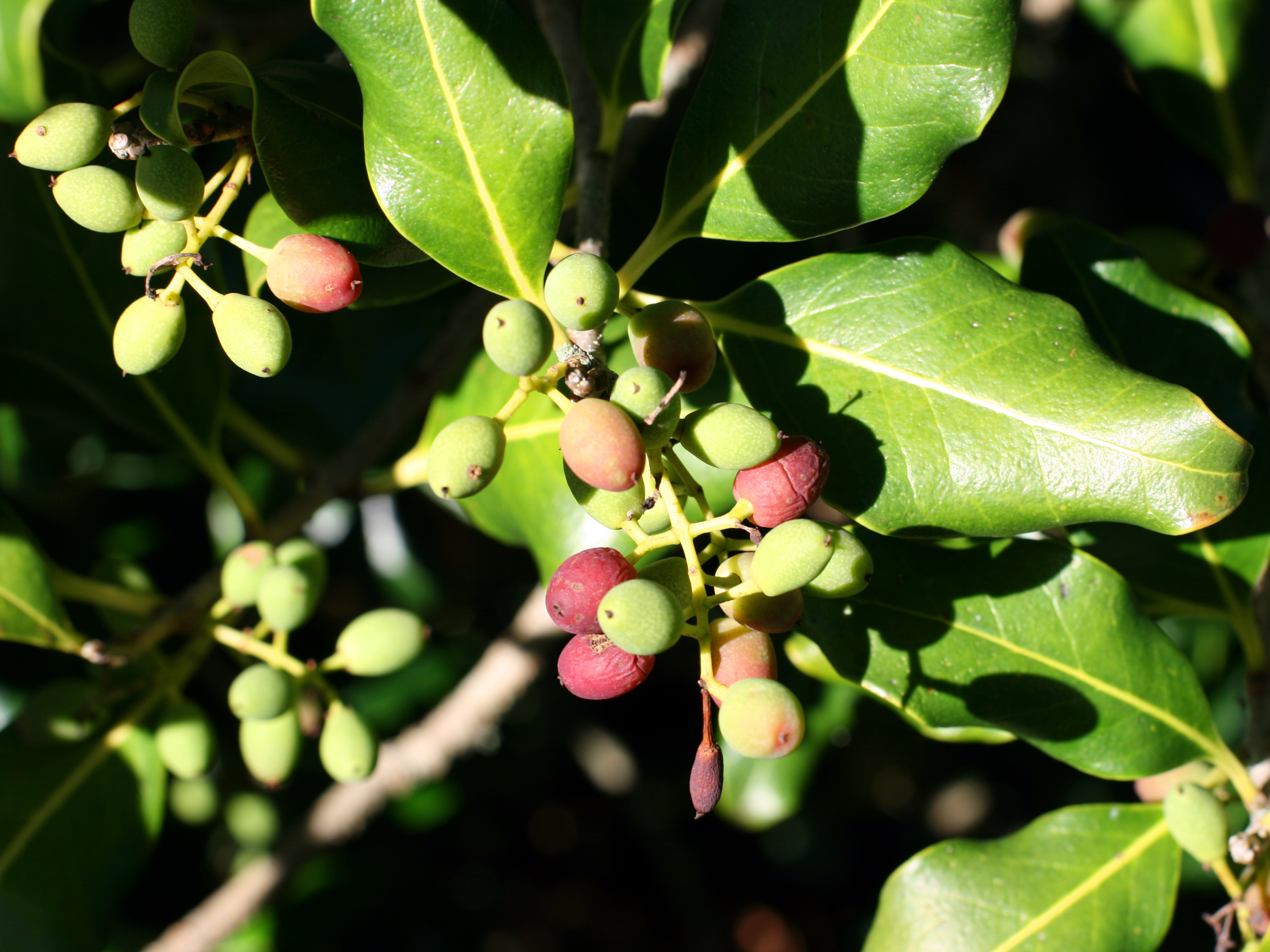
Foliage and olive-like fruit of Notelaea apetala

Notelaea apetala is shrub or tree up to 6 m tall, with smooth, shiny dark green leaves 4.5 to 12 cm long and 1.5 to 4 cm wide. Juvenile leaves are larger, up to 14 cm long by 8.5 cm wide. The leaves are often wavy, and are borne on leaf stems about 10 mm long. The flowers of N. apetala arise in racemes of up to 21 flowers growing from the leaf axils or directly from the branchlets. The individual flowers are each about 2.5 mm in diameter, and lack petals. The fruit is a drupe 9 mm long, red or yellow, less commonly purple when ripe. The New Zealand Plant Conservation Network lists the plant as 'At Risk'.

== Threats ==
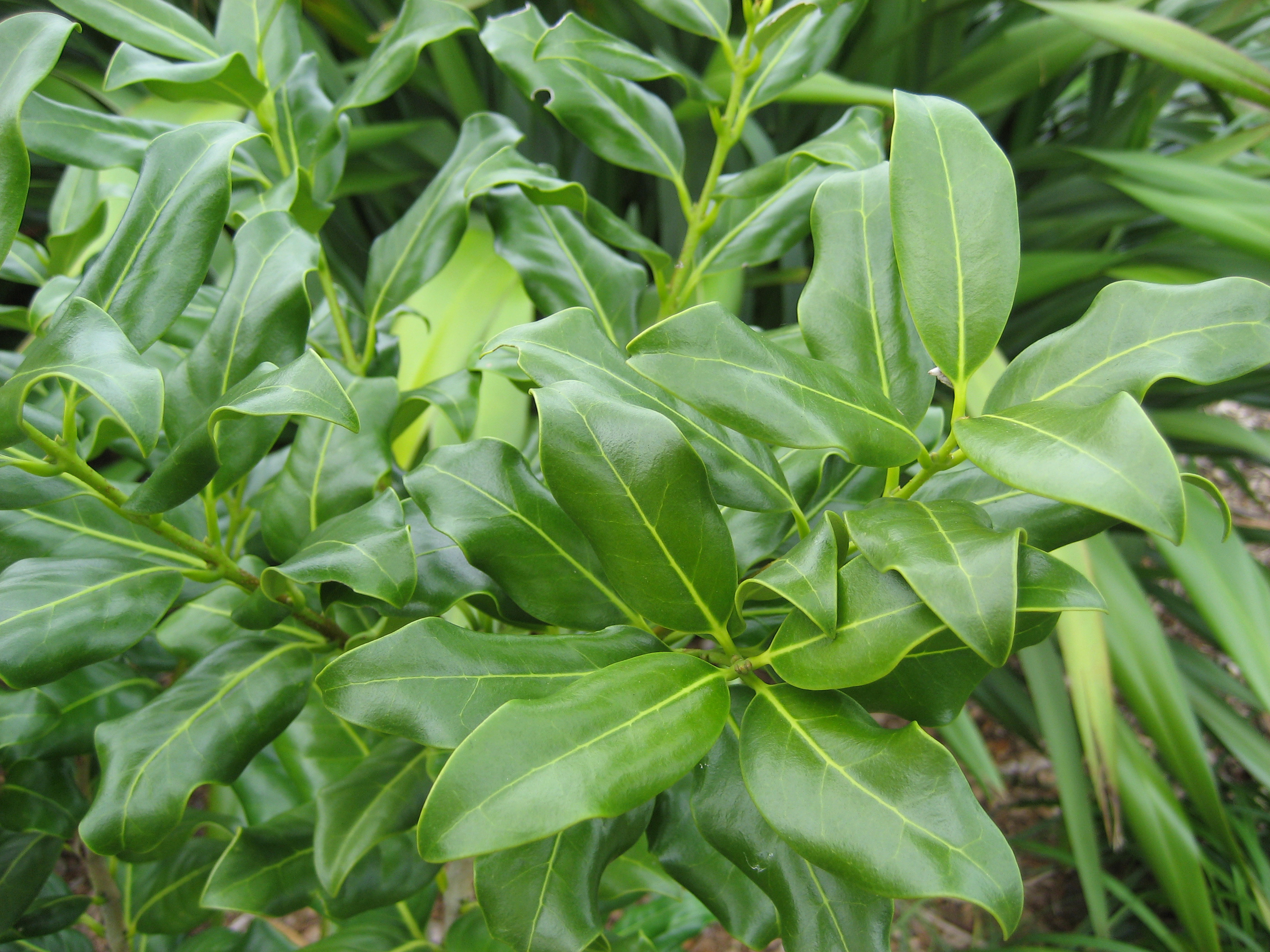
Young plant of Notelaea apetala grown for sale in New Zealand

The fruit and seeds of N. apetala are palatable to rats. Research in New Zealand has shown that the eating of the seeds by kiore (Pacific rats) substantially reduces the population of the tree. Kiore were introduced by Māori sometime in the last 1,000 years and became widespread on the three main islands, and reached many of the offshore islands. At present, Coastal maire is quite a rare tree on the mainland, but this research indicates that it is probable that before the introduction of kiore, it would have been a much more common component of the coastal forests of the northern North Island. Seedlings or saplings of N. apetala are uncommon or rare on off-shore islands such as Hen Island and Lady Alice Island where kiore are present, and abundant on islands such as Tawhiti-rahi and Aorangi in the Poor Knights group where they are absent. Three years after the eradication of kiore from Cuvier Island, seedlings of N. apetala became common near mature trees. However, the scarcity of fruiting trees on modified islands slows seed dispersal and population recovery. (Campbell et al., 1999:282-4).

== Cultivation and uses ==
Notelaea apetala is an attractive small tree noted for its hard timber. The berries are eaten by birds. In New Zealand it is available from specialist nurseries.
