= Wild olive =

Wild olive is a common name for several plants and may refer to:

- Bontia daphnoides
- Several species in the genus Elaeagnus (family Elaeagnaceae), particularly:
  - Elaeagnus angustifolia
  - Elaeagnus latifolia
- Halesia carolina (family Styracaceae)
- Nyssa aquatica, an American swamp-growing tree (family Cornaceae)
- Olea europaea subsp. cuspidata
- Olea oleaster, a species related to the cultivated olive tree (family Oleaceae)
- Osmanthus americanus (family Elaeagnaceae)

== See also ==
- Native olive
