= Santa María de la Vega =

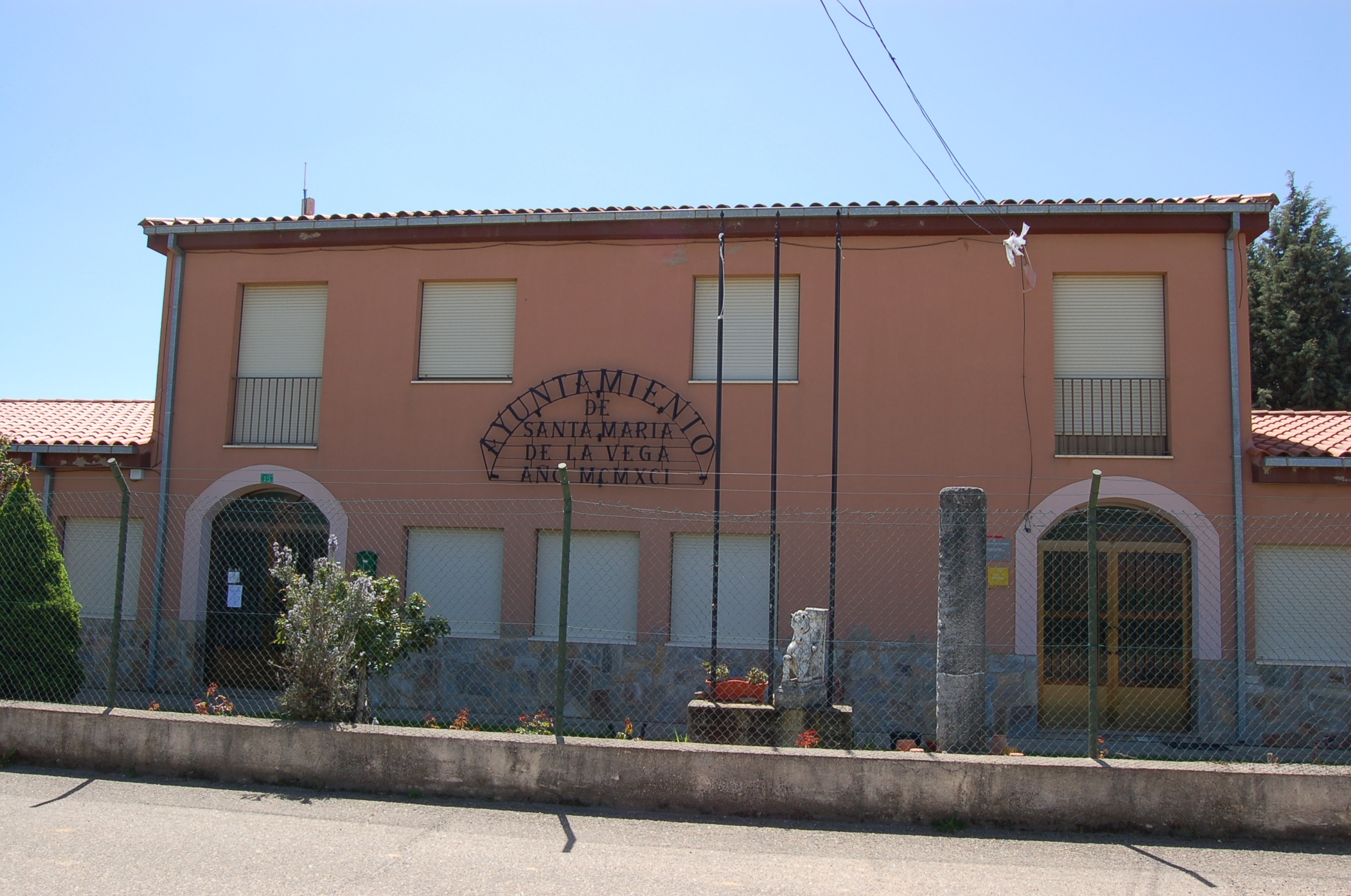

- Flag Coat of arms

- Location in Spain.
- Coordinates: 42.085°N 5.8088°W
- Country: Spain
- Autonomous community: Castile and León
- Province: Zamora
- Municipality: Santa María de la Vega

Area
  - Total: 17 km^{2} (6.6 sq mi)

Population (2025-01-01)
  - Total: 259
  - Density: 15/km^{2} (39/sq mi)
- Time zone: UTC+1 (CET)
  - Summer (DST): UTC+2 (CEST)
- Website: Official website

Santa María de la Vega is a municipality located in the province of Zamora, Castile and León, Spain. According to the 2004 census (INE), the municipality has a population of 475 inhabitants.
