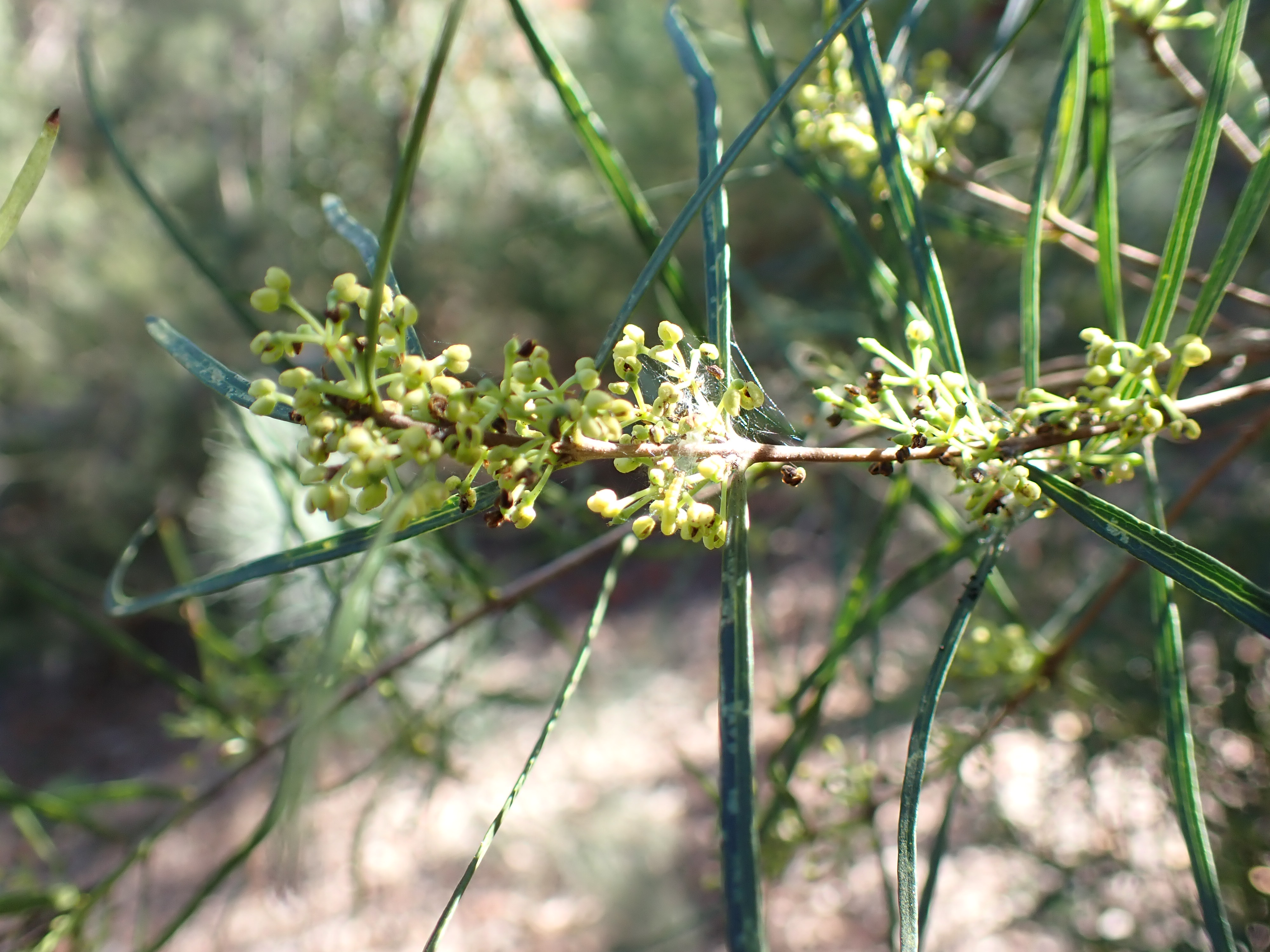

Conservation status
- Vulnerable (EPBC Act)

Scientific classification
- Kingdom: Plantae
- Clade: Tracheophytes
- Clade: Angiosperms
- Clade: Eudicots
- Clade: Asterids
- Order: Lamiales
- Family: Oleaceae
- Genus: Notelaea
- Species: N. lloydii

Binomial name
- Notelaea lloydii Guymer

= Notelaea lloydii =

Species of tree

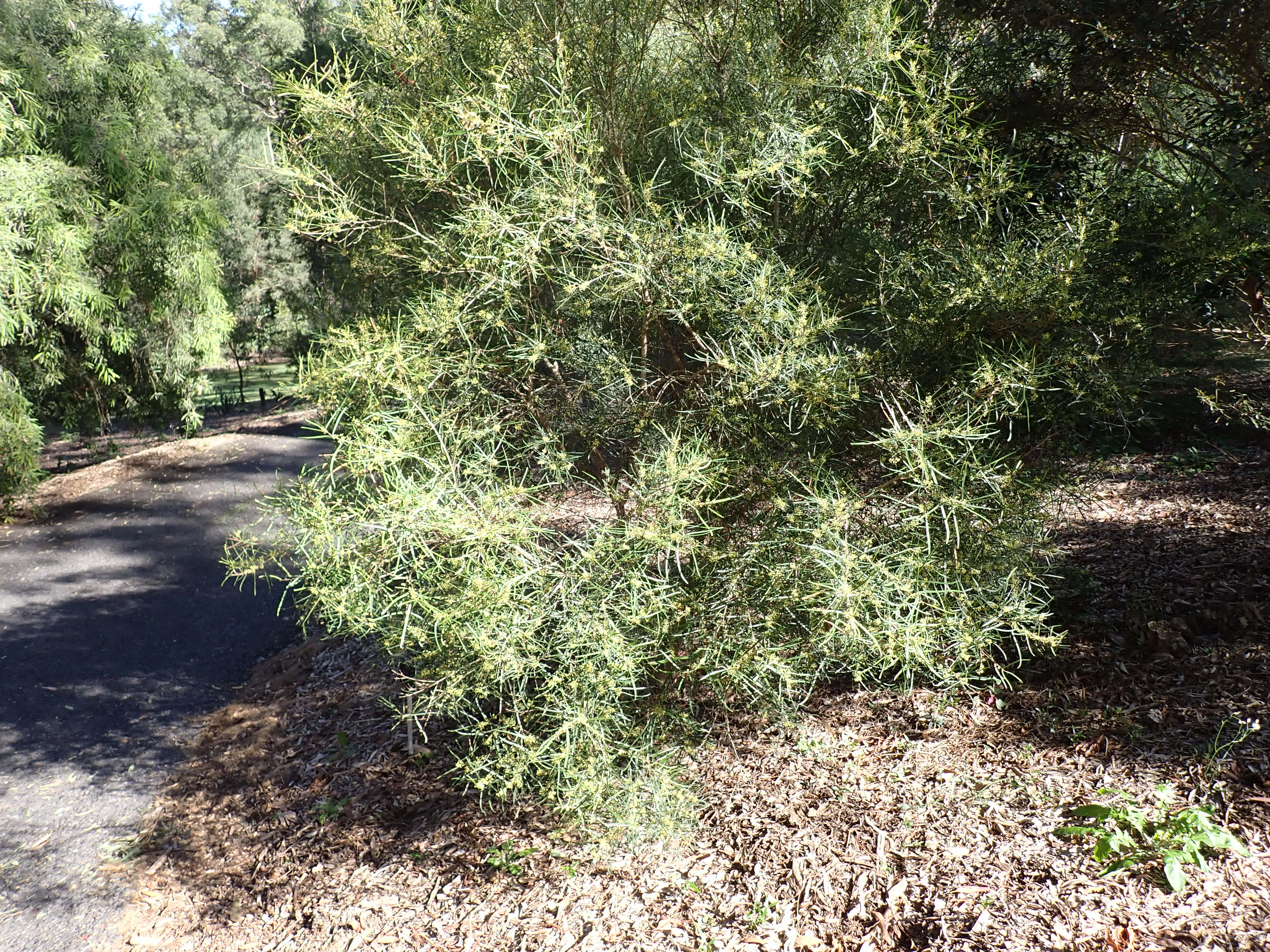
Habit in Mount Coot-tha Botanic Gardens

Notelaea lloydii, commonly known as Lloyd's olive, or Loyd's native olive, is a species of flowering plant in the family Oleaceae and is endemic to Queensland. It is a shrub with leathery, linear or slightly sickle-shaped leaves, pale yellow or cream-colored flowers with 4-lobed petals, 2 stamens and a glabrous ovary. The fruit is a dark blue drupe.

== Description ==
Notelaea lloydii is a shrub that typically grows to a height of 1–3 m (3 ft 3 in – 9 ft 10 in) and has many branches. Its leaves are more or less glabrous, leathery, linear or slightly sickle-shaped, 70–140 mm (2.8–5.5 in) long and 2.0–5.5 mm (0.079–0.217 in) wide on a petiole 1–2 mm (0.039–0.079 in) long. The edges of the leaves are slightly turned down and the veins are distinct on the upper surface. The flowers are pale-yellow or cream-coloured and arranged in clusters of 5 to 9, 5–10 mm (0.20–0.39 in) long in leaf axils. The sepals are 0.2–0.6 mm (0.0079–0.0236 in) long, the petals egg-shaped with 4 egg-shaped lobes 0.9–2.2 mm (0.035–0.087 in) long joined in pairs above the base of the stamens. The ovary is glabrous, 0.7–1 mm (0.028–0.039 in) long with the style 0.10–0.15 mm (0.0039–0.0059 in) long and a pink, 2-lobed stigma. Flowering occurs from June to early August and the fruit is a spherical to oval drupe 6–8 mm (0.24–0.31 in) long and 5–8 mm (0.20–0.31 in) in diameter.

== Taxonomy ==
Notelaea lloydii was first formally described in 1987 in the journal Austrobaileya by Gordon P. Guymer, based on plant material he collected 13.8 km (8.6 mi) west of Kenmore in 1985. The specific eipthet (lloydii) honours "Mr Lloyd Bird of Bundamba".

== Distribution and habitat ==
Lloyd's olive is known from two populations near Beaudesert and near Laidley, and usually grows in open eucalypt forest, often near the edges of vine thickets.

== Conservation status ==
Notelaea lloydii is listed as "vulnerable" under the Australian Government Environment Protection and Biodiversity Conservation Act 1999 and the Queensland Government Nature Conservation Act 1992.
