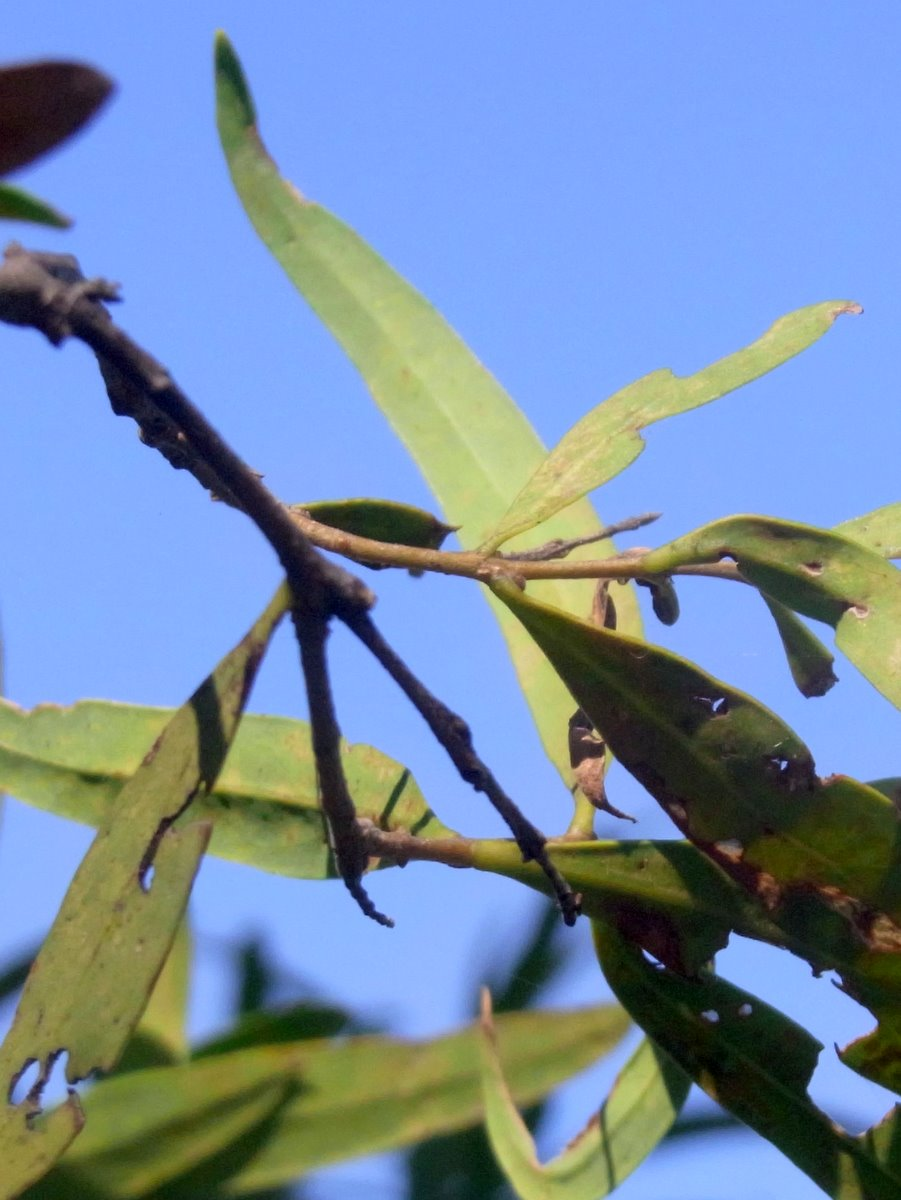

Scientific classification
- Kingdom: Plantae
- Clade: Tracheophytes
- Clade: Angiosperms
- Clade: Eudicots
- Clade: Asterids
- Order: Lamiales
- Family: Oleaceae
- Genus: Notelaea
- Species: N. microcarpa

Binomial name
- Notelaea microcarpa R.Br.

= Notelaea microcarpa =

Species of tree

Notelaea microcarpa is a bush or small crooked tree from the olive family, found in eastern Australia. Two varieties are recognised; var. microcarpa, the velvet mock olive and var. velutina known as the gorge mock olive.

The habitat is in the under-storey of eucalyptus woodland, north of the Hunter Region, north to Queensland. Often on rocky sites, associated with the white box. The gorge mock olive is often found in the drier fire free gully rainforests, in the north of New South Wales. It may grow to ten metres tall, at an altitude of between 500 and 700 metres above sea level. Sites include Oxley Wild Rivers National Park and Chaelundi National Park.

This plant first appeared in the scientific literature in 1810, in the Prodromus Florae Novae Hollandiae, authored by the prolific Scottish botanist, Robert Brown.
