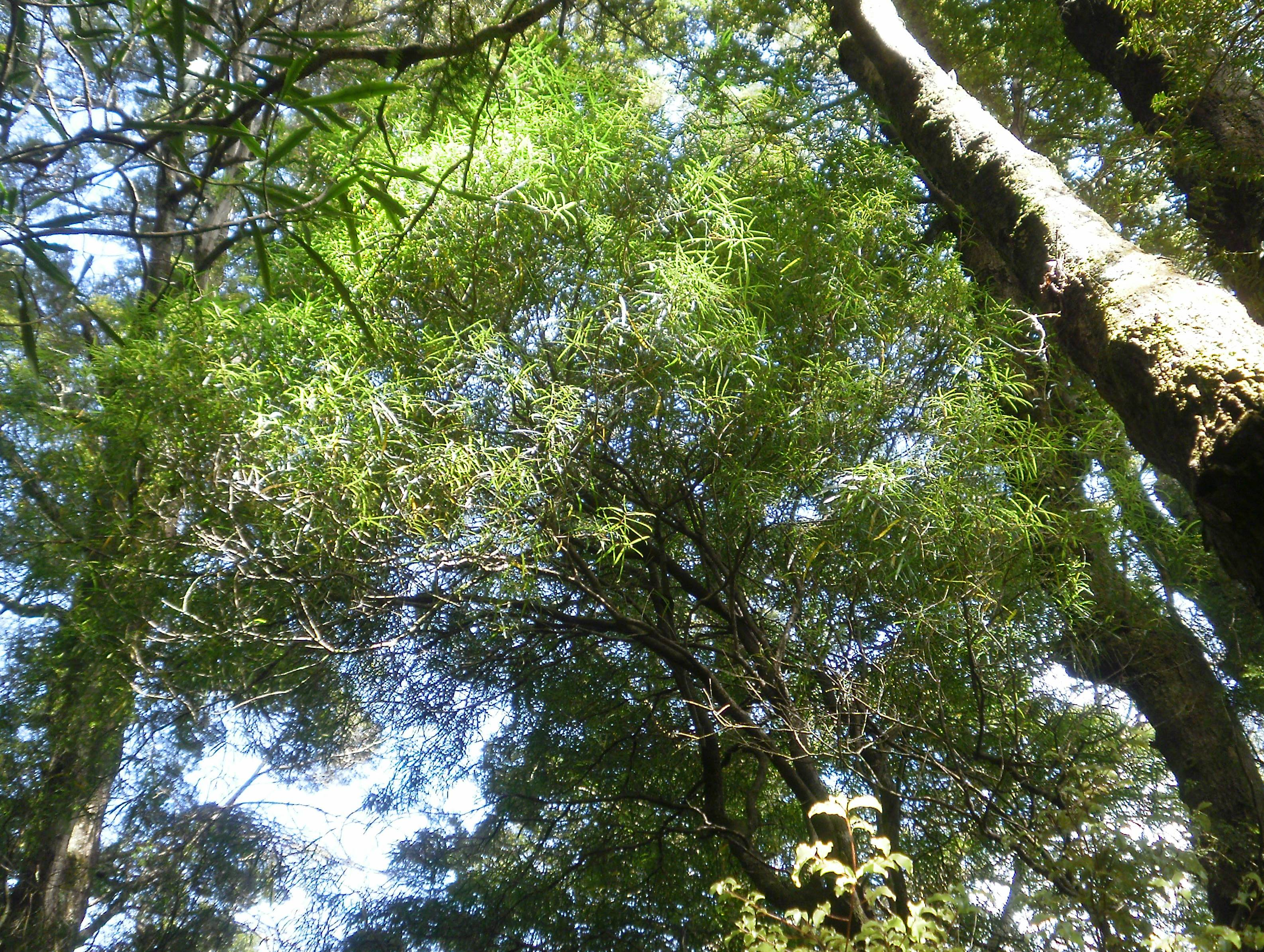

Scientific classification
- Kingdom: Plantae
- Clade: Tracheophytes
- Clade: Angiosperms
- Clade: Eudicots
- Clade: Asterids
- Order: Lamiales
- Family: Oleaceae
- Genus: Notelaea
- Species: N. montana

Binomial name
- Notelaea montana (Hook.f.) Hong-Wa & Besnard

Synonyms
- Gymnelaea montana (Hook.f.) L.A.S.Johnson; Metrosideros salicifolia A.Cunn., nom. illeg.; Nestegis montana (Hook.f.) L.A.S.Johnson; Olea montana Hook.f.

= Notelaea montana =

Narrow-leaved maire

Species of tree native to New Zealand

Notelaea montana, commonly known as narrow-leaved maire, is a tree native to New Zealand.

Notelaea montana has a range from the top of the North Island near Kaitaia south to the top of the South Island around Nelson where it is much less common.

Notelaea montana is found from coastal to high-elevation forest where it is often located beside streams, on ridgelines or steep slopes.

The tree can grow up to 15 metres in height with a dome shaped canopy. It has long, linear leaves that can measure up to 100 x 10 millimetres, distinguishing it from the other New Zealand Notelaea species.

The Latin specific epithet montana refers to mountains or coming from mountains.
