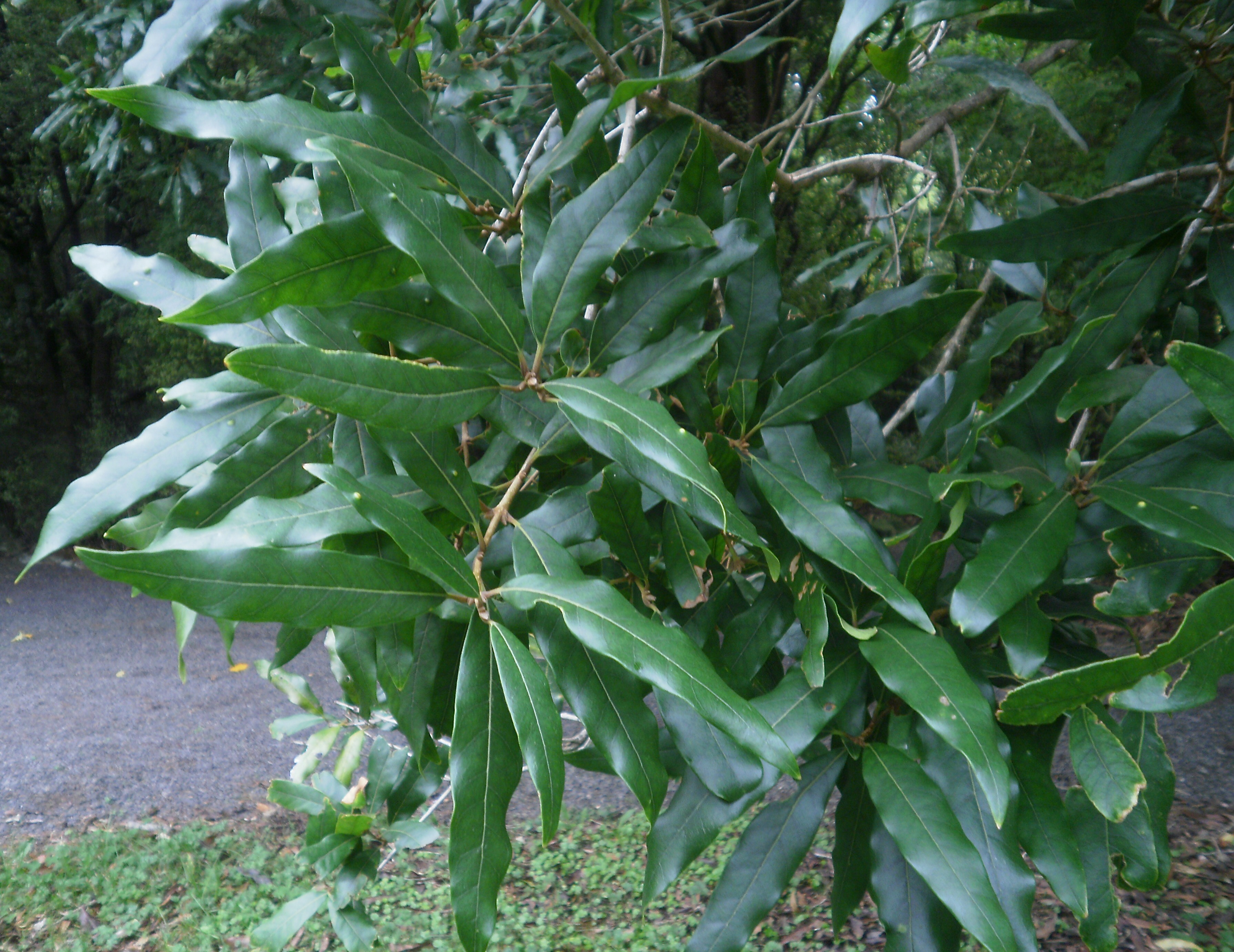

Scientific classification
- Kingdom: Plantae
- Clade: Tracheophytes
- Clade: Angiosperms
- Clade: Eudicots
- Clade: Asterids
- Order: Lamiales
- Family: Oleaceae
- Genus: Notelaea
- Species: N. cunninghamii

Binomial name
- Notelaea cunninghamii (Hook.f.) Hong-Wa & Besnard

Synonyms
- Gymnelaea cunninghamii (Hook.f.) L.A.S.Johnson; Nestegis cunninghamii (Hook.f.) L.A.S.Johnson; Olea cunninghamii Hook.f.

= Notelaea cunninghamii =

Species of tree

Notelaea cunninghamii, commonly known as black maire, is a native tree of New Zealand.

Notelaea cunninghamii grows to over 20 metres high, and has long, leathery leaves that have a recessed mid-rib. The tree has rough, cork-like bark, and produces red or yellow fruits. The red fruits are usually prolific and range from 1-2 cm long. Traditionally, Māori would gather the fruit by placing mats underneath the trees and shaking the trunks, or by ascending them with baskets. The fruit is also popular with tūī and kererū birds.

Black maire is now found only in small areas of the North Island forest because of its high value as a hard timber and for firewood.
