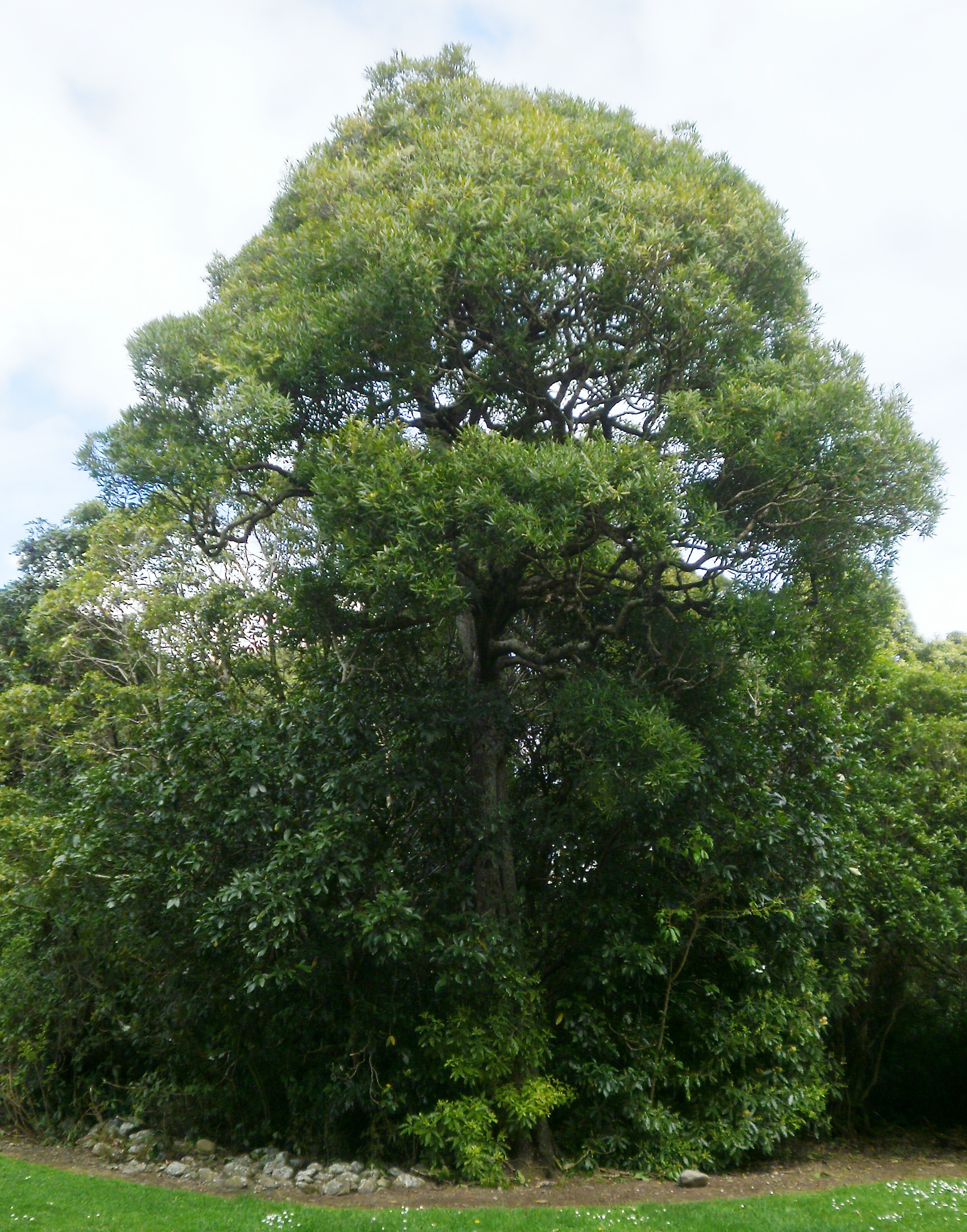

Scientific classification
- Kingdom: Plantae
- Clade: Tracheophytes
- Clade: Angiosperms
- Clade: Eudicots
- Clade: Asterids
- Order: Lamiales
- Family: Oleaceae
- Genus: Notelaea
- Species: N. neolanceolata

Binomial name
- Notelaea neolanceolata Hong-Wa & Besnard

Synonyms
- Gymnelaea lanceolata (Hook.f.) L.A.S.Johnson; Nestegis lanceolata (Hook.f.) L.A.S.Johnson; Notelaea lanceolata (Hook.f.) Hong-Wa & Besnard, nom. illeg.; Olea lanceolata Hook.f.

= Notelaea neolanceolata =

Species of tree endemic to New Zealand

Notelaea neolanceolata, commonly known as white maire, is a tree native to New Zealand.

Notelaea neolanceolata is found from lowland to hilly forest across the North Island. In the South Island, it is uncommon, but is found in the Marlborough Sounds.

It grows to approximately 15 metres high and has long (5–12 cm), leathery and glossy leaves. Racemes of green flowers are produced in spring followed by a 1 cm long red fruit.

== Uses ==
The wood of N. neolanceolata is one of the hardest native timbers of New Zealand. It was traditionally used by the Māori to make tools and weapons. A variety of digging sticks were made from the timber for food gathering and gardening. The wood was also used for beams in the construction of storage houses.
