= Peter Shaw Green =

British botanist (1920–2009)

- Born: 11 September 1920; Rochester, Kent
- Died: 17 August 2009 (aged 89)
- Education: Taunton School; King's College London
- Spouse: Winifred Brown
- Awards: Kew Medal, DSc
- Scientific career
- Fields: Botany
- Workplaces: Royal Botanic Garden, Edinburgh, Arnold Arboretum Harvard University, Royal Botanic Gardens, Kew
- Author abbrev. (botany): P.S.Green

Peter Shaw Green (11 September 1920–17 August 2009) was an English botanist.

== Early life ==
Green was born in Rochester, Kent, the youngest son of John and Elizabeth (née Hainsworth) Green, his father a civilian engineer with the Royal Air Force. He was educated at Taunton School, before studying botany at King's College London. His studies were interrupted by the Second World War, in which he served as an Adjutant (Captain) in the Northumberland Fusiliers, initially training recruits to shoot, but later joining his regiment in Italy, where he contracted typhoid. Upon recovery, he was despatched to Greece. In 1946, while still in uniform, he married Winifred Brown, whom he had met at King's College before the war. After demobilization, he returned to his studies at King's College.

== Career ==
After graduation, Green was appointed Assistant Lecturer at Birmingham University before joining the Royal Botanic Garden, Edinburgh in 1952. In 1961, he moved to the Arnold Arboretum of Harvard University to become Horticultural Taxonomist, but returned to England in 1966 to join the Herbarium of the Royal Botanic Gardens Kew, ultimately rising to the rank of Deputy Director and Curator. Both institutions had special links to the botany of China, and between 10 May and 18 June 1978 Green visited China as host of the Academia Sinica with John Simmons, curator of the Royal Botanic Gardens.

== Retirement ==
Upon obligatory retirement in 1982, Green continued his researches at Kew as an Honorary Research Fellow, concentrating on his favourite flora, Oleaceae and Jasminium. He continued to serve as Vice-President of the Kew Guild, becoming President from 1982 to 1983. He also travelled widely, notably to the islands of the western Pacific, whose flora had preoccupied him during his career at Kew.

== Awards ==
- Kew Medal, 1984
- DSc King's College, 1997

== Publications ==
- Green, P. S. (1964). "Registration of cultivar names in Ulmus". Arnoldia. 24. Arnold Arboretum, Harvard University.
- Green, P. S. (2002). "A revision of Olea L. (Oleaceae)". Kew Bulletin. 57 (1): 91–140. doi:10.2307/4110824. JSTOR 4110824.
- Green, P. S. (May 1973). Plants-Wild and Cultivated: A Conference on Horticulture and Field Botany. Ed. Botanical Society of the British Isles. Classey. ISBN 0-900848-66-9.
- Green, P. S.; Grierson, M. (31 December 1996). A Hawaiian Florilegium: Botanical Portraits from Paradise. National Tropical Botanical Garden. ISBN 0-915809-20-6.
- Green, P. S.; Gotz, E.; Kramer, K. U. (April 1991). Pteridophytes and Gymnosperms. Springer Verlag. ISBN 0-387-51794-4.
