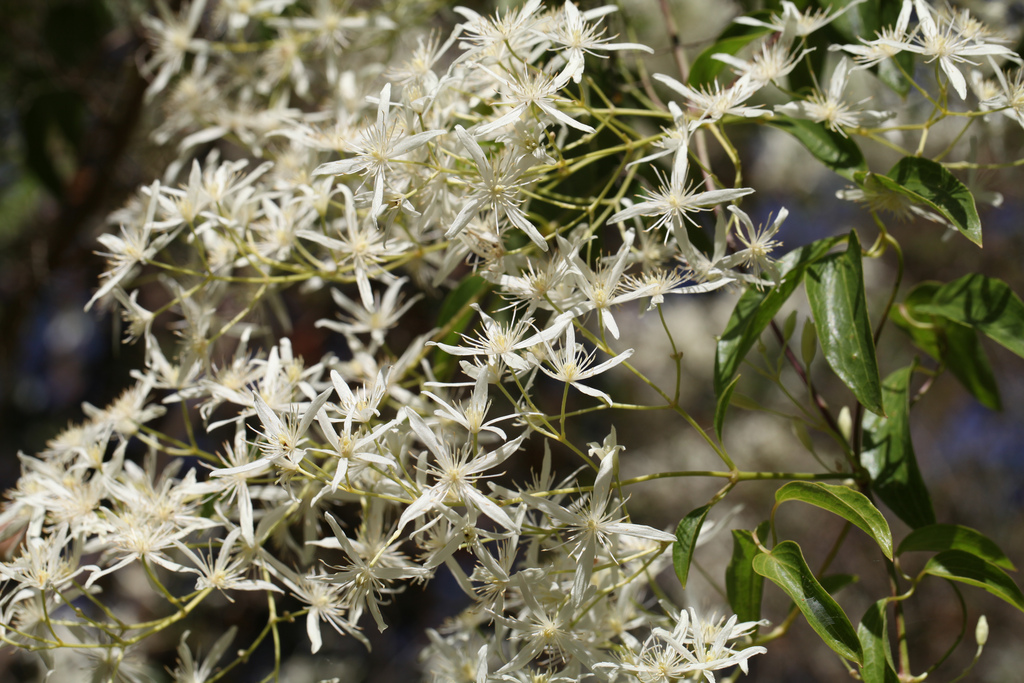

Conservation status
- Least Concern (NCA)

Scientific classification
- Kingdom: Plantae
- Clade: Tracheophytes
- Clade: Angiosperms
- Clade: Eudicots
- Order: Ranunculales
- Family: Ranunculaceae
- Genus: Clematis
- Species: C. glycinoides

Binomial name
- Clematis glycinoides DC.

Synonyms
- Homotypic synonyms: Clematis aristata var. glycinoides (DC.) Kuntze; Clematis aristata subsp. glycinoides (DC.) Kuntze; Clematis glycinoides var. normalis Domin; Heterotypic synonyms: Clematis glycinoides var. dentata Domin; Clematis glycinoides var. floribunda Domin; Clematis glycinoides var. longifoliola W.T.Wang; Clematis glycinoides var. submutica Benth.; Clematis stenopetala R.Br. ex DC.; Clematis stenosepala DC.

= Clematis glycinoides =

Headache vine

Species of flowering plant in the buttercup family

Clematis glycinoides, commonly known as headache vine, is a shrub or climber of the family Ranunculaceae, found in eastern Australia and New Caledonia.

== Description ==
Clematis glycinoides is a woody-stemmed vine that can reach 15 m (49 ft) long, with simple lanceolate (spear-shaped) to oblong leaves that are 1.5–12 cm (0.59–4.72 in) long by 1–8 cm (0.39–3.15 in) wide. The cream-white flowers appear from July to December, although these are most abundant in September. The species is dioecious: the plants have either male or female flowers. The seedheads have several feathery 'tails' up to 6 centimetres (2.4 in) long.

== Taxonomy ==
Augustin Pyramus de Candolle described the species in 1817, based on a specimen from the herbarium of Sir Joseph Banks. The species gains its common name from its folk use as a supposed remedy for headaches. The aroma from the crushed leaves is inhaled, appearing to relieve headaches as a result of the highly irritant properties of the resulting fumes. This process was explained by herbalist Cheryll Williams:

The uncomfortable sensation of breathing in the ammonia-like fumes has been described as "the head 'exploding', the eyes 'watering' and intense irritation of the nasal passages" – such that the initial headache was quickly forgotten.

Two varieties are recognised—C. glycinoides glycinoides and C. glycinoides submutica.

== Distribution ==
C. glycinoides is found in Queensland, New South Wales, and Victoria. It grows in woodland, forests and rainforests, on basalt, limestone, shale or sandstone soils with good drainage. Open forest species that it grows under include grey myrtle (Backhousia myrtifolia), grey ironbark (Eucalyptus paniculata) and manna gum (E. viminalis), as well as floodplain forest trees such as cabbage gum (Eucalyptus amplifolia) and broad-leaved apple (Angophora subvelutina).

Honeybees visit the flowers.

C. glycinoides is possibly not as vigorous as other Clematis in cultivation, and requires moist conditions to do well. Its white flowers are considered to be an attractive feature.
