= Camden Park Estate =

Camden Park Estate and Belgenny Farm
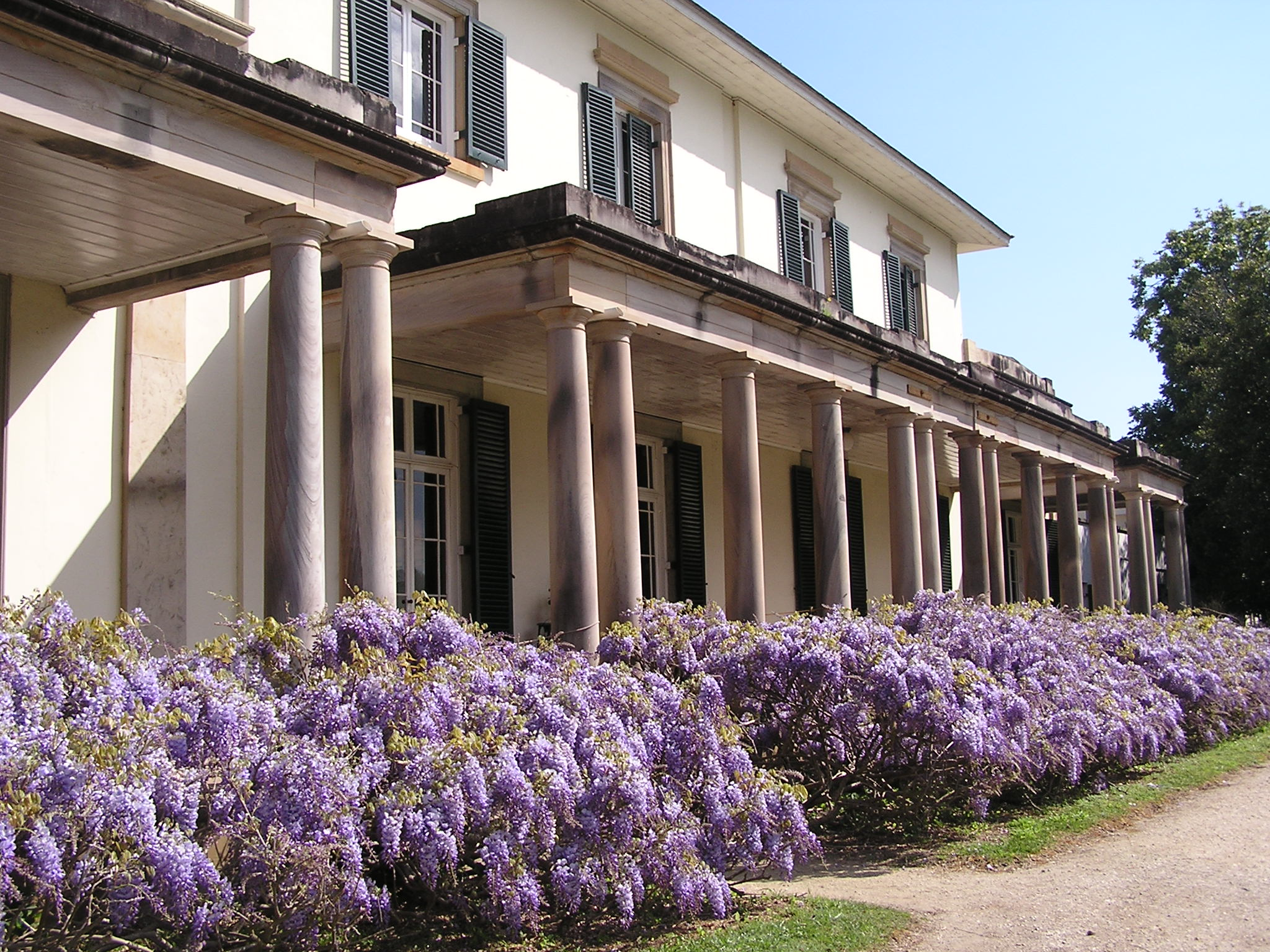
- Camden Park House

- Location within Sydney
- 34°06′32″S 150°43′08″E
- Location: Elizabeth Macarthur Avenue, Camden South, Camden Council, New South Wales, Australia

History
- Built: 1819–1840
- Built for: John Macarthur

Site notes
- Architects: Henry Kitchen c. 1800; John Verge c. 1835; A. J. Onslow c. 1888
- Owner: Belgenny Farm Trust; Camden Park Preservation Committee

New South Wales Heritage Register
- Official name: Camden Park Estate and Belgenny Farm; Elizabeth Macarthur Agricultural Institute (EMAI); Menangle Paddock
- Type: State heritage (landscape)
- Designated: 22 December 2006
- Reference no.: 1697
- Type: Farm
- Category: Farming and Grazing
- Builders: John Macarthur c. 1800; James English and Sons c. 1888; John Sulman c. 1895

The Camden Park Estate incorporating the Belgenny Farm is a heritage-listed large working historical farm located at Elizabeth Macarthur Avenue, in the outer south-western Sydney suburb of Camden South, New South Wales, Australia. It was designed by Henry Kitchen in c. 1800, John Verge in c. 1835 and A. J. Onslow in c. 1888 and built from 1819 to 1840 by John Macarthur in c. 1800, James English and Sons in c. 1888 and John Sulman c. 1895. The property is owned by Belgenny Farm Trust and Camden Park Preservation Committee. It was added to the New South Wales State Heritage Register on 22 December 2006. Today, part of the original estate contains the Elizabeth Macarthur Agricultural Institute; having originally served as a commercial sheep station and horticultural farm for the Macarthur family since the early 1800s.

== History ==
When the first fleet arrived in Sydney Cove in 1788 they found the soil unsuitable for farming and soon looked towards the heavy clay and loam soils of the Cumberland Plain (to the west) to sustain the colony. Early agricultural settlements were located on the rich alluvial soils of the Nepean, Hawkesbury and Georges River areas, as well as South Creek near St Marys and at the head of the Parramatta River where the settlement of Rose Hill (later Parramatta) was established about six months after the fleet landed. A settlement at the Hawkesbury was established in 1794.

The first European settlers in the Camden area were the cattle that escaped from Sydney Cove in 1788 and found their way to the lush pastures of the Wianamatta Shale region. It was the loss of these cattle that led to the discovery of this fertile landscape in 1795, when a party sent by Governor Hunter to investigate rumours of the strayed cattle discovered them in an area they promptly named "Cowpastures". The Cowpastures remained unoccupied due to the official decree that reserved the land for the wild cattle (to encourage their increase).

This area was the traditional land of the Gandangara people. The earliest recorded contact between Europeans and Aboriginal people in this area was described by the French explorer, Francis Barrallier in 1802. Travelling through Cowpastures with his party, Barrallier recorded in his journal that "he met and befriended the Gandangara people".

Evidence of Macarthur's later meeting the Gandangara people is documented in some early records of the "Macarthurs of Camden". When the Privy Council asked Macarthur about "natives" in the area mooted for pastoral land, Macarthur replied that "they come amongst the settlers familiarly, but have no fixed abode, and live upon what they can find for themselves". Within a few years of the Gandangara people formally welcoming Barallier, John Macarthur had settled down in the best part of their traditional lands to graze sheep. James Macarthur and family members have recounted stories of Aboriginal corroborees near Camden Park in 1839, 1846 and 1850.

Moves towards the establishment of Belgenny Farm were first made in 1801, when John Macarthur was exiled to England for causing dissent after fighting a duel in which he shot his own commanding officer. While in England, Macarthur worked to promote his own interests and that of the colony by setting out the groundwork for a wool industry. He convinced the British Secretary of State, Lord Camden, to provide him with more land to pasture his flocks, and he also acquired a small number of merino sheep from the flocks of King George III.

In December 1803 Governor King and Mrs King visited the Cowpastures for themselves and the Sydney Gazette reported that Mrs King was the first "white lady" to have crossed the Nepean River. By 1804 much of the Cumberland Plain had been settled and King began to look for other regions in the colony for favourable arable land. The only suitable land within the Cumberland Plain was the area known as the Cowpastures, located in the south-western corner. This area was named after the discovery in 1795 of cows from the first fleet which had wandered off into the bush.

The track to the Cowpastures led from Prospect and on 17 September 1805 James Meehan, under instructions from Governor King, commenced a survey of the track from Prospect to the Nepean Crossing and a rough road followed the marked line. This became known as Cowpasture Road, later the Hume Highway, most of which is today part of the Camden Valley Way.

Several visits to the area by the colonial gentry took place at this time, which resulted in their desire to acquire some of this rich land for themselves. They saw the area as containing very good grazing land. Captain Henry Waterhouse described the area in a letter to John Macarthur in 1804 as follows: "I am at a loss to describe the face of the country other than as a beautiful park, totally divested of underwood, interspersed with plains, with rich luxuriant grass".

Earlier Europeans had described "large ponds covered with ducks and the black swan, the margins of which were fringed with shrubs of the most delightful tints". The Europeans thought the flats were perfect for cattle and the hills would carry sheep. They admired the absence of underbush – probably achieved through Aboriginal burning off – and felt comfortable with a landscape that reminded them of an English gentleman's park.

On his return to NSW in 1805 with an additional 2,000-hectare (4,900-acre) grant from Lord Camden, John Macarthur selected land known as the Cowpastures on the western side of Nepean River. Although these were the traditional lands of the Gandangara people, Macarthur expressed his gratitude to Lord Camden by naming the 1805 grant "Camden". From this time, John Macarthur resigned his commission as leader of the opposition to Governor Bligh and devoted himself to farming and commercial activities.

Macarthur received the first land grant in the Cowpastures region in 1805 for his role in the early wool industry in the colony. Lord Camden rewarded him with 4,047 hectares (10,000 acres) and Macarthur chose the highly coveted Cowpastures for his grant, though Governor King tried to prevent him taking it. Macarthur also organised an 809-hectare (2,000-acre) grant for his friend Walter Davidson, who allowed Macarthur to use his land freely after Davidson returned to England. In this manner Macarthur controlled 19 kilometres (12 mi) of riverbank on the site where the wild cattle had first discovered the best pasture near Sydney. Later purchases and exchanges increased the Macarthur land there to over 10,927 hectares (27,000 acres), an endowment that Governor Macquarie greatly resented.

Other early grants were in the Parishes of Minto and in adjoining Evan, Bringelly, Narellan and Cook. These all lay west of Parramatta. James Macarthur and family members have recounted stories of Aboriginal corroborees near Camden Park in 1839, 1846 and 1850.

One of the first improvements Macarthur made to the property was the construction of a small hut on a ridge at Benkennie (Belgenny). Contemporary illustrations show it to have been a simple slab hut with a bark roof and a chimney on one side. It was located a short distance from the present Belgenny Cottage. However, disputes continued between Macarthur and Bligh over the control of the rum trade and its use as a currency. In 1807 when Macarthur resisted Bligh's order to arrest him, Bligh had him placed under "house arrest" by Rum Corps officers. Macarthur was effectively exiled from the colony from 1810 to 1817 for his involvement in the "Rum Rebellion", leaving his wife Elizabeth to do most of the work in developing food production at Camden Park.

Elizabeth left her residence at Elizabeth Farm and spent the culling season in the original hut while she managed the property. Governor and Mrs Macquarie stayed there during their visit in 1810 and described the hut as "small and miserable". By 1813, the Camden Park flock had increased to 4033 and a wool store had been built to house the clip.

=== Origins ===
John Macarthur, who had arrived in the colony of New South Wales in 1790 had quarrelled with successive governors. He was forced to return to England to face trial for duelling (the charges were dismissed). While he was there, he gained the patronage of, among others, the Colonial Secretary, Lord Camden. Camden supported Macarthur and ordered Governor King to grant Macarthur 5,000 acres (20 km^{2}) at a location of his own choosing. In 1805 when Macarthur returned to Sydney he choose the fertile 'Cowpastures', which was the first area beyond the Nepean River to be settled. King grudgingly acceded to Lord Camden's wishes, and the grant was verified in 1806. Macarthur named his new property 'Camden Park' in honour of his patron.

Amongst the first structures to be built at Camden Park was a slab and bark hut, referred to as the 'miserable hut' by Governor Macquarie. Located to the immediate North of the Belgenny Farm complex, the area thought to have been the site of this and other huts was the subject of an archaeological dig in 2009.

From 1809 to 1817, John Macarthur left Australia as a result of his pivotal involvement in the revolt that overthrew Governor William Bligh, the so-called Rum Rebellion. His wife Elizabeth managed his extensive pastoral interests in his absence. While in Europe, Macarthur studied agriculture and viticulture, and toured on foot throughout France with his sons James and William. John Macarthur was allowed to return to the colony in 1817 on condition that he no longer participate in public affairs. He turned his attentions to developing his considerable estates, and the merino flocks which he had moved to Camden Park.

=== Viticulture and agriculture ===
In 1816, the Royal Society for the Arts in England had offered medals for wine from New South Wales. As early as that year, Blaxland (at Brush Farm in Ryde) was sending wine to Governor Macquarie to keep him informed about the possibility of an Australian wine industry. Blaxland certainly knew of the grape varieties brought back to Australia in 1817 by John, James and William Macarthur and of their plantings at Camden Park. But their first vintage was not until 1824.

John Macarthur returned from England in 1817 with his two sons, James and William, and began to expand the productivity of the farm by introducing vine cuttings, olive trees and various seeds and agricultural implements purchased overseas. However an olive tree at the Macarthurs' Elizabeth Farm, Parramatta, dates from c. 1807 and the first olive trees presented to Sydney's Royal Botanic Gardens as a gift of the Macarthurs in 1816 predate the Camden Park olive trees.

By 1819 a new cottage had been built at Belgenny, possibly designed by Henry Kitchen, and Macarthur was dividing his time between Camden, Elizabeth Farm and Hambledon Cottage at Parramatta.

The following decade was prosperous for the family with their wool receiving record prices and prizes. Belgenny was the centre of operations for the Camden estate and its importance increased as the family's pastoral and agricultural activities were concentrated on the estate. An additional 4,170 hectares (10,300 acres) were granted to the family in four separate parcels with a further 400 hectares (990 acres) rented. Clearing and burning programs were begun to prepare the land and threshing and dressing machines were ordered from local merchants. In 1824 a two-hectare (four-point-nine-acre) house site had been fenced off and a dairy had been built which employed 14 dairymaids and 23 shepherds. This implies that there were a number of dwellings for the estate workers in existence at this time. A further 4,208 hectares (10,400 acres) were added to the estate holdings in 1825 expanding the property to an area covering over 10,000 hectares (25,000 acres), with an additional 400 hectares under lease.

In 1825 James Busby wrote the first of a number of books on viticulture and wine making. In 1833, he brought 437 grape cuttings back to NSW and made these widely available (through the Botanic Gardens, Sydney). Busby, who had been trained in vineyard management, grape varieties and wine making in France, referred to Mr Blaxland's vineyard as being a showplace in the Sydney Basin. He commented on the generosity of Blaxland to share his knowledge and cuttings from his vineyard. Cuttings from Brush Farm provided early vines for Wyndham Estate (at Dalwood) in the Hunter Valley. It was not until the 1830s that William Macarthur sent 34,000 vines from Camden Park estate to the Barossa Valley in South Australia, to begin the wine industry in that state.

The creamery was built c. 1826 with a number of other buildings, including modifications to the stables. These were originally two separate buildings that were joined to form one continuous building. In 1827 the community was provided with a place of worship, possibly made to serve later as a school. At the end of this decade the property was fenced. Livestock included sheep, horses, cattle and dairy cows. Crops included maize and wheat which grew along the river flats. During the 1830s, orchards, tobacco and vegetable crops were established and a mechanical irrigation system installed. Camden House was built between 1832 and 1835 but Belgenny remained the agricultural focus of the estate. It was here that John Macarthur lived out the final years of his life. He died in 1834 and was buried in the family cemetery located on a nearby hill.

William Macarthur took over the management of the estate after his father's death and was responsible for the introduction and hybridization of many exotic plant species, and experiments with new agricultural methods.

William was also committed to commercial and scientific agriculture and horticulture and purchased a considerable amount of farm machinery in Europe. Between 1837 and 1839, a commercial dairy was established and the Macarthurs brought out 42 families and a small number of single men to settle at Camden Park. Each settler was provided with a two-bedroom cottage with a kitchen, small pantry, verandah and a quarter-acre block.

The estate and Macarthur family were instrumental (along with Brush Farm, Ryde via Gregory Blaxland and the Sydney Botanic Gardens, via James Busby) in establishing the Australian wine industry. Camden Park became world-renowned for the quality of its wine. It played a vital role in the fledgling Australian wine industry through its importation and distribution of vine cuttings throughout NSW and the Barossa Valley of SA. By 1841 William & James were producing more than 23,000 litres; 6,000 US gallons (5,000 imp gal) and that wintage won gold medals in England. In 1844 24,000 vine cuttings were sent from Camden Park to Adelaide, setting South Australia on a path to becoming an internationally acclaimed wine growing district. By 1853 Camden Park listed some 33 grape varieties for sale. Camden Park became world-renowned for the quality of its wine and by 1845 was producing around 45,000 litres; 12,000 US gallons (10,000 imp gal) per annum as a serious vineyard and one of the most highly regarded in the colony and with quite a reputation overseas.

The Australian Dictionary of Biography entry for Sir William Macarthur 1800–1882 mentions that William "grew many fruit trees, vegetables and flowers and that later he built a hothouse and imported valuable orchids". Although there is no evidence of any breeding of ornamental garden plants in the early days of the colony, botanical records dating from 1831 reveal a growing interest in plant hybridisation and colonial botanical assignments. Early botanical records held at the Royal Botanical Gardens Sydney, show that William Macarthur of Camden Park collected native plant specimens from all over NSW, and was donating oleanders and cape bulbs to the gardens from 1827. He also imported Australia's second consignment of camellias from England on the ship Sovereign in 1831, the first being imported from England by Alexander Macleay of Elizabeth Bay House and Brownlow Hill in 1826. A camellia japonica "Anemoniflora" or "Red waratah" bush still survives at Camden Park House garden today and is possibly the oldest surviving camellia plant in Australia. With the publication of Catalogue of Plants Cultivated at Camden, 1845, it is apparent that the introduction, hybridization, distribution and export of ornamental garden plants was becoming a growing industry. Of particular interest to the colony's growing plant industry was mention of new varieties of hibiscus and camellia being hybridised at Camden Park.

The first hibiscus to be introduced to NSW was an import of a single "red" by John Macarthur. The hybrid of this hibiscus became known as H. x camdenii. Macarthur introduced at least a thousand varieties of new plants and from 1843, the Macarthurs published an annual catalogue of their plants. Exports were also listed in this publication, with the 1845 edition noting that William Macarthur sent two hybrid coral trees known as "Erythrina camdenensis" to Conrad Loddiges and Sons, a well-known Hackney nurseryman in London. This coral tree is believed to be the first Australian hybrid garden plant to be published in England, in 1847. William Macarthur continued to donate plants to the Royal Botanical Gardens Sydney until 1880, including roses, pelargoniums, orchards, palms, araucarias and tropical shrubs. He also regularly received plants from the Royal Botanical Gardens Sydney between 1835 and 1868, including grapes, Australasian conifers, African gesneriads and native plants.

The orchard and nursery formed important parts of the estate, with the orchard surviving until the 1970s. A single "Gravenstein" apple tree is all that now remains, and it is perhaps the oldest surviving apple tree in Australia. A camellia japonica "Anemoniflora" (anemone flowered / waratah form) bush survives at Camden Park house today, and is possibly the oldest surviving camellia plant in Australia.

John Gould Veitch, esteemed English nurseryman described Camden Park on a visit in 1864:

"Camden Park, the Seat of Sir William Macarthur, November 17, 1864 – Sir William Macarthur, who is now almost as well known in Europe as in Australia, is a most enthusiastic amateur in horticulture. Camden Park is situated in the centre of an estate of 30,000 acres of fine arable and pasture land. It is 40 miles from Sydney and easily accessible by rail, the station of Mena(n)gle being within 4 miles of the house. "Camden Park is famed for its wine. Extensive vineyards are under cultivation. The principal grapes grown are those from Germany. The wine is made by men from the Rhenish wine districts. In 1866 Veitch referred to Macarthur in "The Gardeners Chronicle" as NSW's most prominent amateur botanist and his collection of plants and fruits as "by far the finest I have seen in the colony".

— John Gould Veitch, 1864.

William, in conjunction with John Carne Bidwill, was involved with plant hybridization including roses, camellias, gladioli, cape bulbs and gesneriads such as African violets. He actively corresponded with botanists in England, Europe, America and India, exchanging plants and seeds. The Macarthurs compiled a collection of botanical specimens (about 100 survive) both of plants on the estate and from the district. This collection represents amateur botany and curation from at least the 1830s onwards, being some of the earliest such work and study done here. Rarer species are held as duplicates by the Herbarium at the Royal Botanic Gardens, Sydney. William also produced the first hybrid in Australia when he crossed one cape bulb hybridized Crinum x scabropedunculation (C. scabrum South Africa) with a native species parent C. pedunculatum. Joseph Hooker, the Director of the Kew Gardens in London, credited John Carne Bidwill with its creation, although Bidwill himself credited William Macarthur.

=== Gardens and vineyard ===
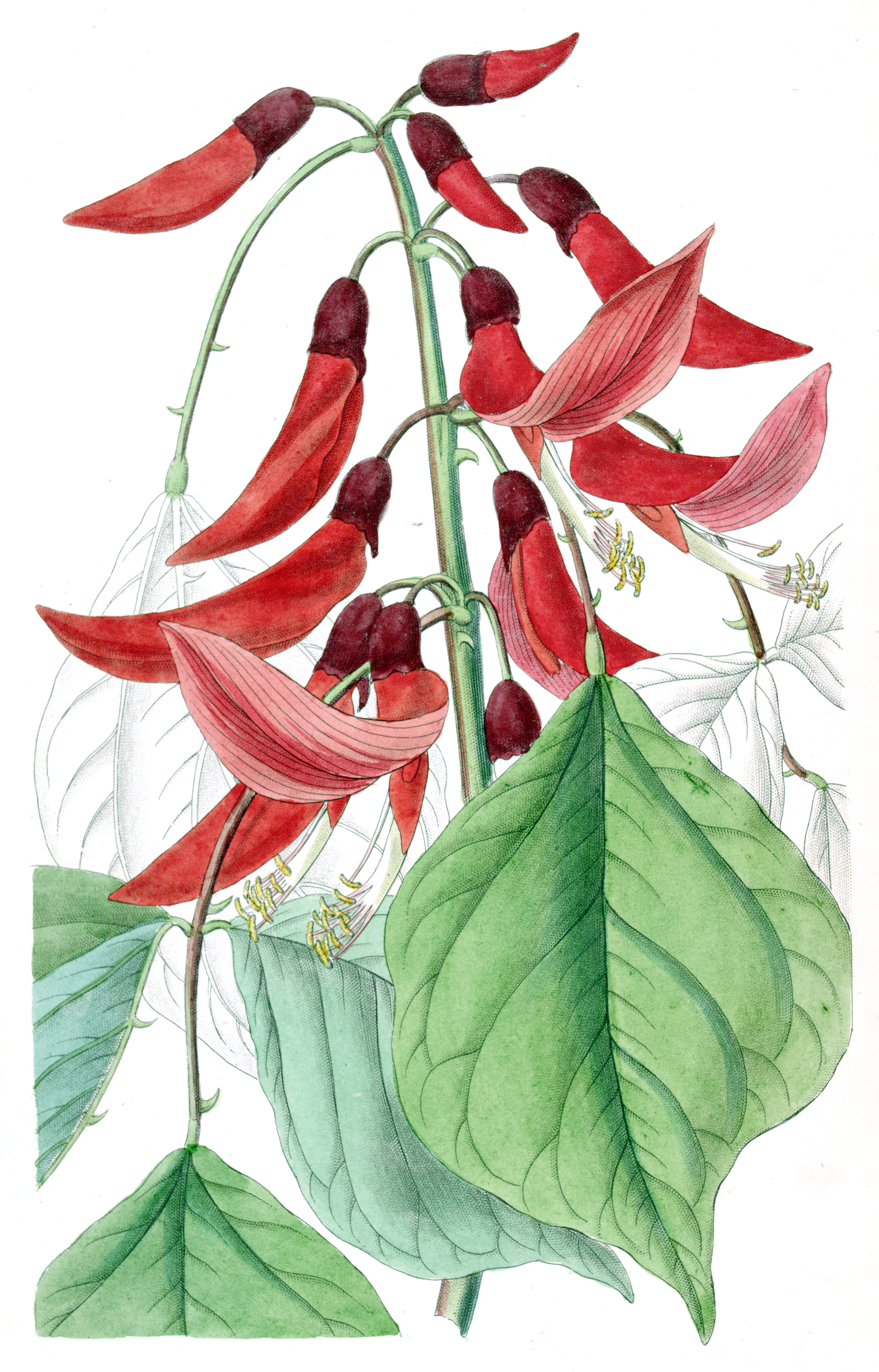
Illustration of Erythrina ×bidwillii 'Camdeni' – a cultivar developed at Camden Park.

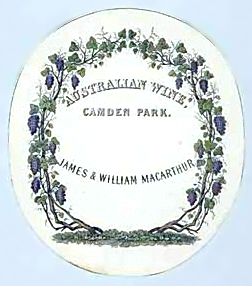
Wine label of James and William Macarthur – used for wine produced at Camden Park Estate.

The extensive vineyards were later destroyed during the international phylloxera outbreak of the 1870s. On a hill directly facing the front of the house is the family mausoleum where John and Elizabeth Macarthur and most of their children are buried; a painting by Conrad Martens in the house collection depicts the structure. Members of the family in the direct line are still buried here. The graveyard is an excellent example of colonial arcadian landscaping, with exotic Chinese elms dominating the planting.

The gardens surrounding Camden Park are the largest and most intact Australian early colonial garden in existence. They are largely the creation of Sir William Macarthur, who was a keen botanist and horticulturalist and operated a sizeable commercial nursery from the estate. Old catalogues of plants for sale from the Camden Nursery provide an idea as to the contents of colonial gardens. Many trees date from the 19th century, including a bauhinia planted by Ludwig Leichhardt, the oldest camellia in the country – the 'anemoniflora' or 'waratah' camellia (Camellia japonica var. anemoniflora), a Queensland 'bottle tree' and unusual jubaea palms (Jubaea chilensis). Camden Park has always been associated with camellias, William having produced the first Australian camellia cultivar here, the 'Aspasia macarthur'.

The gardens and landscape are a combination of the colonial picturesque – which in the Cowpastures area had a decidedly 'arcadian' quality – and the gardenesque. Vistas from the house stretch out to nearby Mount Annan, Mount Gilead, the church spire of St John's at Camden, and the family cemetery. The location of St Johns was carefully surveyed by Sir Thomas Mitchell; from the house carriage loop the spire is symmetrically framed by the distant Mountains Hunter and Taurus, earning the church the local quip 'built to the glory of God and to enhance the view of the Macarthurs'.

Although the export of ornamental garden plants was not one of Camden Park's major industries, nursery catalogues reveal that cultivars from Camden Park were being sent to Rules Nursery, St Kilda, Victoria, as late as 1852.

William encouraged winemaking and brought out several German vignerons and their families. From the 1830s onward, the estate played a major role in establishing the wine industry by exporting tens of thousands of vine cuttings to Western Australia, Tasmania and Victoria. During the 1840s, vineyards were planted and the home farm expanded as new buildings were constructed and additions made to the cottage. The estate and family were instrumental in establishing the Australian wine industry. Camden Park became world-renowned for the quality of its wine. Camden Park played a vital role in the fledgling Australian wine industry through its importation and distribution of vine cuttings throughout NSW and the Barossa Valley of SA. By 1853 Camden Park listed some 33 grape varieties for sale. By 1841 William & James were producing more than 5000 gallons and that vintage won gold medals in England. In 1844 24,000 vine cuttings were sent from Camden Park to Adelaide, setting South Australia on a path to becoming an internationally acclaimed wine growing district. Camden Park became world-renowned for the quality of its wine and by 1845 was producing around 45,000 litres; 12,000 US gallons (10,000 imp gal) per annum as a serious vineyard and one of the most highly regarded in the colony and with quite a reputation overseas.

A horse stud was established at the farm, which grew in importance as a feature lasting into the new century. The granary was built at some time after 1840 and was used to store produce and the carpenter's shop may have been erected at this time although its original function is unknown.

The economic recession of 1840 resulted in some land being sold with the proceeds from the sale used to fund the construction of a road network and an underground silo. By 1846, tenants had increased in number as more than 800 people lived on the property, occupying more than 80 hectares.

From the end of the 1840s, the sheep stud decreased in importance and grain crops emerged as a staple. Part of the sheep flock was sold to William Campbell in 1846, who moved this stock to his Victorian property, and the remainder of the flock was sold in 1849. By the late 1850s there were approximately 160 farms on the estate. The sale of livestock continued up until 1856 when most of the horse stud was gone.

Governor Macquarie drew up plans in 1820 for establishment of a town in the area, to be named Campbelltown after his wife Elizabeth's maiden name. With their forced return to England in 1822 these plans never came to fruition and it was not until the arrival of Governor Darling in 1827 that plans were again reinstated and the first settlers were allowed to take possession of their town land in 1831. In the early 1850s the railway line from Sydney to Goulburn was completed, with a station opening at Campbelltown in 1858. When Leppington House was offered for lease in 1865, one of its selling points was that it was near a railway. Campbelltown now provided easy access to Sydney and its markets and grew as the centre of the district. Although Camden was established in 1836, with no railway line it remained a small town.

The large estates that flanked Cowpasture Road (later Camden Valley Way) and the Northern Road were run largely as sheep and cattle farms, with wheat and other grain crops being grown as well until the 1850s. The houses were often built on surrounding ridges or hills, providing sweeping views of the countryside and ensuring that any passing traveller could appreciate the owner's status by viewing their impressive country mansions from the road. This land use pattern of large farm estates and small towns, established in the nineteenth century, remained largely the pattern of development of the area up until the late 1990s. Aerial photographs of the area in 1947 show a rural landscape with some limited urban development on either side of (then) Camden Valley Way.

During the 1860s, crop disease caused the decline of grain as a principal economic unit. Mixed farming based on horticulture, wine, mixed grain and agistment of cattle and sheep became the dominant economic pattern. By 1875, many of the tenants were given notice to quit as a result of falling agricultural prices and changing trends in farming. There were 19 tenants on the estate when William Macarthur died in 1882, increasing to 73 by 1885. In 1889 management was taken over by Onslow and Thompson, who had plans for renovating and repairing the buildings. The estate had become a little run-down and required repairs to all of the major holdings. During the 1890s, all Camden Park Estate roads were re-laid and edged with new fence posts and rail stock fences. Planted along all the estate fencing were miles of hedges. China monthly rose had been originally introduced by John Macarthur to Elizabeth Farm Parramatta in 1848. This was probably Rosa Chinensis, "Parson's China monthly".

In 1898, a cream separator was installed and a piggery nearby were built at Belgenny Farm. During the early 1900s, an engine room was built by the farm's carpenter to house steam and diesel engines, which were used to drive chaff cutters and other machinery.

The farm had become economically negligible however the real wealth came from the orchard and dairy. In 1899 more cottages were built and a co-operative dairy was established with some of the tenant farmers. 387 hectares (960 acres) of land were reserved around the house and the remainder became Camden Park Estate Ltd.

During the 1900s, new milk and hay sheds were erected. Land sales and subdivisions paid for the construction of a new dam and underground water tank. Between then and 1920, more cottages were built on the estate, a number of timber silos were built and a second dam constructed.

A 1919 Royal Agricultural Society plaque honouring twelve agricultural pioneers includes Gregory Blaxland along with Sir Joseph Banks, John Macarthur, Samuel Marsden, James Busby, Alexander Berry and others.

In 1921 a milk depot with a railway siding was built at Camden. Menangle Model Dairy was built in 1926 and improvements were made to the home dairy. From this time onwards the economic basis of the estate changed as the dairy activities at Menangle became prominent. The creamery building was used for this purpose. In 1928 a new timber slaughterhouse was built. By 1937, Belgenny became primarily a storage place for machinery. The working horse stables were converted to a shearing shed and additions were made to the granary and blacksmith's shop. The second storey of the creamery, which housed the cream separator, was demolished and a community hall was built.

In 1952 the Rotolactor was built at Menangle.

By 1965 the estate was known as Australia's largest dairy. Dairy activities centred around Menangle. Belgenny Farm was mainly used to store machinery and the working horse stables were converted into a shearing shed.

In 1973, as a direct result of the rural recession of the 1970s, the land surrounding Belgenny was sold to new owner/developers with plans to redevelop the land for housing. At this time the orchard was unfortunately destroyed.

In 1976 the NSW Government through the Department of Planning stepped in to conserve Belgenny Cottage and farm buildings by purchasing 729 hectares (1,800 acres) of land and the buildings for $1.2 million. A further 444 hectares (1,100 acres) were purchased in 1984 for $2.85 million. The purchase did not include the land surrounding Camden Park House, which is still owned by members of the Macarthur-Stanham family.

The first work carried out on the property was the conservation of Belgenny Cottage, which was completed during the early 1980s.

The NSW Department of Planning and Infrastructure currently owns the property. It is managed by the NSW Department of Agriculture, which has established the Elizabeth Macarthur Agricultural Institute there. Within that, Camden Park House, garden and central portion of the estate is still owned, occupied and farmed by the Macarthur / Stanham family.

Camden Park was a large sheep run established by John Macarthur south of Sydney near present-day Camden in New South Wales, Australia. Macarthur, who had arrived in the colony in 1790 as a lieutenant in the New South Wales Corp, had quarrelled with successive governors and most of his neighbours, and in 1801 was sent to England for court martial after being involved in a duel. In England charges against him were dropped. Whilst in England Macarthur lobbied hard for support for his ideas as to the production of fine wool in the colony, which he believed would end England's dependence on Spanish wool. His beliefs were largely ridiculed by Joseph Banks, who would eventually acknowledge the success of the venture. Banks was patron to William Bligh, whom Macarthur was later instrumental in overthrowing. Macarthur however had powerful patrons, including Walter Farquhar, physician to the Prince of Wales, and the Colonial Secretary, Lord Camden. Camden supported him and ordered Governor King to grant Macarthur 2,023 hectares (5,000 acres) at a location of his own choosing. In 1805 when Macarthur returned to Sydney he chose the fertile "Cowpastures", which was the first area beyond the Nepean river to be settled. King begrudgingly acceded to Lord Camden's wishes, and the grant was verified in 1806. Macarthur named his new property "Camden Park" in honour of his patron.

The first structure built at Camden Park was a slab and bark hut, referred to as the "miserable hut" by Governor Macquarie. The site is now marked by a stone cairn.

From 1809 to 1817 John Macarthur left Australia as a result of his involvement in the Rum Rebellion. His wife Elizabeth managed his interests in his absence. While in Europe Macarthur studied agriculture and viticulture, and toured on foot throughout France with sons James and William. He was allowed to return to the colony in 1817 on condition that he no longer participate in public affairs. He now turned his attentions to developing his considerable estates, and the merino flocks which he had moved to Camden Park.

In 1821 the Macarthurs built Belgenny Farm House, a timber "cottage ornee". This house and the related outbuildings, known as the "Camden Park Home Farm", form one of the oldest surviving groups of farm structures in Australia. In 1832, after Macarthur had finally decided to make Camden the "family seat", he commissioned architect John Verge to design a house of a stature suitable for one of the colony's leading and wealthiest families. The house was completed in 1835, shortly after John Macarthur's death in 1834. Sons James and William Macarthur took up occupancy in the new house, while their mother Elizabeth continue to reside at Elizabeth Farm in Parramatta, in which she had a life interest. Many of the furnishings still seen in the house were acquired by James Macarthur on a subsequent trip to England, where he met his wife Emily Stone. Their only child Elizabeth was to inherit the estate. She later married captain Arthur Onslow, and through that marriage their son James Macarthur-Onslow was to inherit both Camden Park and Elizabeth Bay House in Sydney. The current owners are the Macarthur-Stanham family. Formerly a basalt quarry, Quarry Paddock has its surface strewn with stone chips. Characterised by a steep hill, the hilltop has expansive views across the site and beyond, and overlooks the cemetery with which it has a strong visual connection. Zone 17 has a sparse and fairly continuous canopy cover of narrow leaved ironbark (Eucalyptus crebra). Located here is also a cottage, one large olive tree (Olea europaea cv.) and remnant timber fencing.

=== Later years ===
Many of the furnishings still seen in the house at Camden Park were acquired by James Macarthur on a subsequent trip to England, where he met his wife Emily Stone. Their only child Elizabeth was to inherit the estate. She later married Captain Arthur Onslow, and through that marriage their son James Macarthur-Onslow was to inherit both Camden Park and Elizabeth Bay House (the Onslows being related to the Macleay family) in Sydney. Portraits of the principal family members hang in the house's dining and drawing rooms.

6 years after the death of her husband in 1882, Elizabeth Onslow took her children to England. While the children were at school, Elizabeth studied dairy farming and on returning to Camden in 1889 she founded a dairy farming complex, the Camden Vale Milk Co., which eventually merged with the Dairy Farmers' Co-operative Milk Co in 1928. Dairy Farmer's 'gold top' milk, known by its gold foil bottle top, was sourced from Camden Park. The property is still a working dairy farm.

It is likely that Camden Park is the oldest post-1788 property still owned and occupied by descendants of its original family, the present owners being the Macarthur-Stanham family. The house and garden are open each year on the second last full weekend of September.

== Description ==
=== Estate overview ===
Camden Park was a large sheep run established by John Macarthur south of Sydney near present-day Camden in New South Wales, Australia. Macarthur, who had arrived in the colony in 1790 as a lieutenant in the New South Wales Corp, had quarrelled with successive governors and most of his neighbours, and in 1801 was sent to England for court martial after being involved in a duel. In England charges against him were dropped. Whilst in England Macarthur lobbied hard for support for his ideas as to the production of fine wool in the colony, which he believed would end Englands dependence on Spanish wool. His beliefs were largely ridiculed by Joseph Banks, who would eventually acknowledge the success of the venture. Banks was patron to William Bligh, whom Macarthur was later instrumental in overthrowing. Macarthur however had powerful patrons, including Walter Farquhar, physician to the Prince of Wales, and the Colonial Secretary, Lord Camden. Camden supported him and ordered Governor King to grant Macarthur 5,000 acres at a location of his own choosing. In 1805 when Macarthur returned to Sydney he choose the fertile "Cowpastures", which was the first area beyond the Nepean river to be settled. King begrudgingly acceded to Lord Camdens wishes, and the grant was verified in 1806. Macarthur named his new property "Camden Park" in honour of his patron.

The first structure built at Camden Park was a slab and bark hut, referred to as the "miserable hut" by Governor Macquarie. The site is now marked by a stone cairn.

From 1809 to 1817 John Macarthur left Australia as a result of his involvement in the Rum Rebellion. His wife Elizabeth managed his interests in his absence. While in Europe Macarthur studied agriculture and viticulture, and toured on foot throughout France with sons James and William. he was allowed to return to the colony in 1817 on condition that he no longer participate in public affairs. He now turned his attentions to developing his considerable estates, and the merino flocks which he had moved to Camden Park.

In 1821 the Macarthurs built Belgenny Farm House, a timber "cottage ornee". This house and the related outbuildings, known as the "Camden Park Home Farm", form one of the oldest surviving groups of farm structures in Australia. In 1832, after Macarthur had finally decided to make Camden the "family seat", he commissioned architect John Verge to design a house of a stature suitable for one of the colony's leading and wealthiest families. The house was completed in 1835, shortly after John Macarthur's death in 1834. Sons James and William Macarthur took up occupancy in the new house, while their mother Elizabeth continue to reside at Elizabeth Farm in Parramatta, in which she had a life interest. Many of the furnishings still seen in the house were acquired by James Macarthur on a subsequent trip to England, where he met his wife Emily Stone. Their only child Elizabeth was to inherit the estate. She later married captain Arthur Onslow, and through that marriage their son James Macarthur-Onslow was to inherit both Camden Park and Elizabeth Bay House in Sydney. The current owners are the Macarthur-Stanham family.

Camden Park house is a two-storey Palladian structure with single-storey pavilions to either side. It is built of stuccoed sandstock brick, with window and door architraves and other detailing of locally cut stone, including Marulan mudstone. The roof is of slate, while the service wings had the first documented use of corrugated iron in the colony. The house has a colonnaded verandah and sandstone portico. The dining room has a finely detailed arched apsial end, and there is a large drawing room, library and breakfast room connected "en fillade" with views to the gardens and landscape beyond. The "geometric" staircase is to one side, not centrally placed, perhaps reflecting its rural nature. The service wings stretch to the side, rather than the rear as is conventional with colonial houses, and have a central courtyard beneath which are large cisterns. They originally had no external windows or doors, only a stronmg gate at one end, reflecting the secure nature of the house. Large cellars stretch the entire length and width of the main block of the house, and were partly used for storing the estates considerable wine production. The extensive vineyards were later destroyed after a phloxera outbreak. There is a large brick stable and, on a hill directly facing the front of the house, the family mausoleum where John and Elizabeth Macarthur and most of their children are buried. Members of the family in the direct line are still buried here.

The gardens surrounding Camden Park are the largest and most intact Australian colonial garden in existence. They are largely the creation of Sir William Macarthur, who was a keen horticulturalist and operated a sizeable commercial nursery from the estate. Catalogues of plants for sale give us an excellent idea as to the contents of colonial gardens. Many trees date from the 19th century, including a bauhinia planted by Ludwig Leichhardt, the oldest camellia in the country – the camellia anemoniflora or "waratah" camellia – and unusual jubaea palms. Camden Park has always been associated with camellias. William produced the first Australian cultivar here, the camellia "Aspasia macarthur".

The gardens and landscape are a combination of the colonial picturesque – which in the Cowpastures area had a decidedly "arcadian" quality – and the gardenesque. Vistas from the house stretch out to nearby Mt Annan, Mt Gilead, the church spire at Camden, and the family cemetery.

It is likely that Camden Park is the oldest post-1788 property still owned and occupied by descendants of its original family. It has an annual open weekend, held on the second last full weekend of September.

=== Estate agricultural zones ===
The whole land surface of the site should be considered as an ongoing and interrelated agriculture property rather than a site of individual structures or concentrated areas of heritage interest. Therefore, the property has been segmented into 21 distinctive landscape zones of internally consistent character. These zones are not subdivisions, but a way of segmenting a large area with regard to topographic and natural features, visual catchments, existing vegetation and agricultural uses, the built environment and ownership. The property can also be broken down into four distinctive landscapes based on the approach of the 1985 Landscape Report prepared by the Government's Architect's Branch of the Public Works Department of NSW.

Zone 1 – Menangle Paddock

Menangle Paddock is open and expansive in character. It is a group of cleared, arable fields, gently sloping around Foot-Onslow Creek. Significant structures on this sight include a Sulman-designed gatehouse on Woodbridge Road, a row of cottages, a post office, the Department of Agriculture buildings and associated plantings along Menangle Road. This architectural edge marries the zone visually to Menangle Village.

Planting within the zone occurs in a linear fashion. Willows (Salix sp.) delineate the creek, Lombardy poplars (Populus nigra 'Italica') line one of the access roads and a privet hedge forms part of the southern perimeter. Similar hedging is located in the adjacent Rotolactor property. *

Zone 2 – Exposed Hills

Flanking Woodbridge Road to the south of the Estate are steeply rounded grassy hillsides, almost entirely cleared of tree cover, save for one olive tree (Olea europaea cv.) 0on "One Tree Hill". A few scattered narrow leaved ironbark (Eucalyptus crebra), a prominent feature of exotic plantings associated with Dairy No. 4. and is visible from Menangle. Zone 2 is the only example on site of exposed hills viewed against the skyline and semi-replanting on the lower slopes retains the bare character of the hilltops.

Zone 3 – Ridgetop

Due to Ridgetop's height, its strong north–south axis, and the steepness of the adjacent slopes, Ridgetop forms the dominant geomorphological and visual backbone of the site. The extensive views to the east and west across the property to neighbouring countryside, Menangle village and to the ridges in the middle and far distance gives an understanding of the site's regional landscape context. It has undergone only partial clearing and presents a sparse, yet fairly continuous cover of narrow leaved ironbark (Eucalyptus crebra).

Zone 4 – Top Paddock

Top Paddock comprises steep slopes and minor ridgelines to the west of the main ridge. The two valleys are nearly bare of vegetation. The three ridges have been only partly cleared and retain a fairly generous cover of Eucalyptus crebra on the upper slopes. The lower slopes have been replaced by grey box (Eucalyptus moluccana) and forest red gum (E. tereticornis) and she oak (Casuarina glauca) in areas of high soil salinity or impeded drainage. Top paddock is presently used for grazing and these steep slopes offer broad views downslope to Navigation Creek Valley. The character of this zone has changed since the completion of the Agricultural Research Station, however this site is visually contained within the landscape and is not too apparent beyond this catchment.

Zone 5 – East Slopes

Overlooking the Nepean Plain and river to the east, these vegetated pastoral East Slopes are very steep. Visual quality of this area is lessened by overhead transmission lines and the Department of Agriculture security fencing. The dominant species is again narrow leaved ironbark (Eucalyptus crebra).

Zone 6 – Nepean Plain

Zone 6 is fairly flat land and has been completely cleared of tree cover and the only significant feature is the slight depression towards Menangle Pond. The adjacent mining operations and associated clearing are highly visible.

Zone 7 – Mining Lands

As a result, from Menangle Sand and Soil mining operations, the original land profile has been lowered and the river banks have been destabilised. Zone 7 was almost completely cleared of indigenous vegetation until rehabilitation, however weed growth has appeared and the natural river character has been lost. Without control, the river bank vegetation and visual qualities may be completely lost.

Zone 8 – Barragal

In the northern portion of the Nepean Plain, Barragal Lagoon is overlooked from the north by a steep hill accommodating a sandstone monument that marks the camping place where Governor Macquarie and his wife stayed in 1810. From the hilltop, superior views include the lagoon and swale in the foreground. In the middle distance are views of the Nepean Plain and river and Menangle village beyond. On the lagoon fringe grows blue box (Eucalyptus bauerana) while forest red gum (E. tereticornis) woodland and grassy understorey dominates the upper slopes. Waterfowl frequent the lagoon and other species of birds vary with fluctuating water levels.

Zone 9 – Sawyers Paddock

Sawyers Paddock has an open character and is visually contained although distant ridges to the east are visible. Sawyers Paddock is pastoral land on a minor ridgeline crossed by overhead transmission lines. It is partly vegetated with grey box (Eucalyptus moluccana).

Zone 10 – Hamlet Basin

Hamlet Basin has a levee depression formation that runs parallel with the existing river course. Zone 10 comprises several lagoons and ponds, a deep natural swale along the southern orchard boundary. Its enclosed atmosphere is created by the low ridge to the west, and the riverbank and orchard planting to the east which it overlooks. Located in Zone 10 are six workers' cottages that are associated with the orchard. The pastoral basin itself is sparsely vegetated with rough barked apple (Angophora subvelutina), she oak (Casuarina glauca) and cabbage gum (Eucalyptus amplifolia), and the swale with large specimens of rough barked apple (A subvelutina), and river oak (Casuarina cunninghamiana).

Zone 11 – Indigenous Reserve

Indigenous Reserve is referred to as "Sawyer's Wildlife Conservation Area" and has been enclosed to allow for the regeneration of indigenous vegetation. This controlled zone has seen the re-emergence of a dense understorey of herbs, shrubs and tree seedlings which is uncharacteristic of the rest of the Estate. The dominant indigenous vegetation is rough barked apple (Angophora subvelutina), cabbage gum (Eucalyptus amplifolia), and ribbon gum (E.viminalis).

Zone 12 – Orchard

Zone 12 is presently used in part for grazing and fodder crops and is enclosed by riverbank vegetation to the north and east, and by the Indigenous Reserve to the west. These expansive flat fields form a portion of the river terrace and remnant fruit trees are found closer to the river bank.

Vegetation is significant in this area due to the exotic plantings carried out by William Macarthur. Extensive remnants of these plantings survive today and some specimens being at least 140 years old. Of particular significance was a small Gravenstein apple tree (Malus sylvestris 'Gravenstein') that was planted c. 1837 and was believed to be one of the oldest apple trees still in existence in the country. This tree has since died and attempts to graft onto the roots have failed. In the recent past the southern extent of the Orchard was used as a citrus grove. The Orchard also includes structures such as the old piggeries and sheds. Other mature exotic trees are growing on the far side of the orchard on the flat to the NE of the house/garden a few kilometres away though off the Menagle Road. These comprise an evergreen magnolia / bull bay (Magnolia grandiflora) c. 160 years old, male and female maidenhair trees (Ginkgo biloba) and several cork oaks (Quercus suber).

Zone 13 – Navigation Creek Valley

This is a broad, fairly flat, alluvial and flood-prone valley extending approximately north–south the length of the Estate, exhibiting erosion near the creek head to the south. In its northern extent it is open and pastoral in character, and largely bare of vegetation except for some she oaks (Casurarina glauca) along the creek. To the south, vegetation is diverse with Angophora hybrids and Pimelea spp.

Zone 14 – Cummin's Flat

Hawkey's Dam, a shallow damming of Navigation Creek, enclosed on the east and west by hills and on its perimeter by tree planting to prevent wind evaporation, is a working example of Keyline practice (based on the writings of P.A. Yeomans). Perimeter plantings carried out in 1960–61 include she oak (Casuarina glauca), flooded gum (Eucalyptus grandis), spotted gum (Corymbia maculata), grey gum (Eucalyptus moluccana), mugga ironbark (E.sideroxylon var. Rosea), forest red gum (E. tereticonis), Monterey pine (Pinus radiata) and Lombardy poplar (Populus nigra 'Italica').

Cummin's Flat is very open, flat and grassy with glimpses of water to be viewed through the trees and reflections of flooded gums in the northern part of the dam. Cummin's Flat is susceptible to evaporation and when the water volume is low, the flat is used for grazing.

Zone 15 – West Expanse

This West Expanse is flanked by the Hume Highway and Finns Road to the west of the Estate and has broad views across the site to the central ridge. Zone 15 is a hilly and pastoral terrain and comprises a fairly sparse canopy cover of narrow leaved ironbark (Eucalyptus crebra), grey gum (E. moluccanna) and open woodland of she oak (Casuarina glauca).

Cameron's Dam with perimeter row planting of river oak (Casuarina cunninghamiana), flooded gum (Eucalyptus grandis), spotted gum (Corymbia maculata), Mugga ironbark (E. sideroxylon 'Rosea'), and silky oak (Grevillea robusta) is also located in this vicinity. The west expanse also contains two groups of dairy buildings and associated plantings located on two dairy farms.

Zone 16 – Camden Paddock

Camden Paddock is characterised by a gentle undulating landscape. Open in character, Camden Paddock's north-west boundary forms the edge between the Estate and suburbia. A pastoral landscape associated with Belgenny, the Macarthur cemetery, the calf pens and the dairy, it is almost entirely clear of vegetation aside from a few scattered rough barked apple (Angophora subvelutina) to the south and dam planting to the north.

Zone 17 – Quarry Paddock

Formerly a basalt quarry, Quarry Paddock has its surface strewn with stone chips. Characterised by a steep hill, the hilltop has expansive views across the site and beyond, and overlooks the cemetery with which it has a strong visual connection. Zone 17 has a sparse and fairly continuous canopy cover of narrow leaved ironbark (Eucalyptus crebra). Located here is also a cottage, one large olive tree (Olea europaea cv.) and remnant timber fencing.

Zone 18 – Cemetery

Located on top of a knoll, the cemetery is significant burial ground for generations of Macarthur descendants, and the focus of dense exotic plantings. Enclosed and restful, its location above the flood-prone valley offers extensive views to the east of the Macarthur-Onslow Estate, and to the north-west over Belgenny, forming an important component of the landscape. William Macarthur established these cemetery gardens in 1834 and designed them to have two distinct compartments. The cemetery gardens were developed in the style of the English Landscape School. An iron palisade fence surrounds the outer perimeter garden and a second internal palisade fence contains the graveyard and further plantings. The southern side of the graveyard contains a single large tuckeroo (Cupaniopsis anacardioides) and is a rare botanical specimen planting. The major components of this area are Port Jackson pine or native cypress (Callitris rhomboidea) and the kurrajong (Brachychiton populneum) which are likely to be remnants of the original dry hill top woodland. African olives (Olea europaea var. africana) also dominate the canopy.

Zone 19 – Belgenny Farm

Belgenny Farm was the headquarters for what is now the Camden Park Estate and is sited on a minor ridgeline. Belgenny has a strong visual connection with the cemetery and has broad views over the pastoral landscape to the east. The Belgenny group comprises an important collection of tenant cottages and timber farm buildings. This community is an exemplar of early Australian construction in timber. This zone includes the adjacent Dairy No. 2, timber calf pens and remnant exotic plantings.

Zone 19 is where Belgenny Farm started and many early 19th century buildings have survived intact due to a conservation program designed by Howard Tanner and Associates Pty Ltd during the 1980s.

Timber is the main building material used for construction at Belgenny Farm. The buildings are stabilised and well conserved with little replacement to the original structures. Originally a small hut was constructed on the ridge at Belgenny Farm and was occupied by the Macarthurs between 1801 and 1817. A small stone monument marks the site not far from the present Belgenny Cottage.

Belgenny Cottage was built in several stages, the earliest dating c. 1819. The original structure is located in the middle section of the current day cottage and was occupied by John Macarthur until his death in 1834 (in front of the fire) and was occupied by the family until 1835. The original section is the oldest surviving part and is made from brick nog, a very early form of construction. Original roof shingles remain beneath the iron. The cottage would originally have had packed earth floors, raised floorboards were a later addition. To accommodate the inward-opening doors, the raised floor had to have the "cut out" seen today. After John's death the cottage served as a manager's residence and later as an office (until the early 1970s), thus it had many alterations. The rear section is a "Hudson ready cut" or "kit" house, erected in 1920 on the foundations of an older building.

Other structures within Belgenny Farm are the stables c. 1826, the creamery (originally built as a coach house c. 1820s then operated as a creamery between 1900 and 1928), the slaughterhouse, the carpenters' building from the 1840s and the blacksmith's shop c.1930s. A number of important remnant historic plantings remain on the Belgenny Estate such as the English oak (Quercus robur) located on the northern side of Belgenny Farm. This was planted by John Macarthur from an acorn he collected in 1789 from an Elizabeth Farm planting (now dead). It is the oldest surviving English oak tree in Australia. Originally, two dovecotes were located on the farm and were believed to have housed pigeons that flew messages between Belgenny and Elizabeth Farm. Today, only one survives.

The old oak tree (Quercus robur) to the cottage's south-west is reputed to be the oldest oak tree in Australia. It was supposedly grown from an acorn picked up in one of the English Royal Estates (undated 'Belgenny Farm: historical walking tour brochure).

Adjacent to the 1920s addition to Belgenny Farm located near the remaining dovecote may be the site of the original Macarthur garden. In 1993, remnant root stock and stumps of the original roses from this garden survived and new shoots were being nurtured. Immediately south of the homestead is a multi-stemmed kurrajong (Brachychiton populneum) In spite of its old scar tissue from livestock damage, it is one of the healthiest and finest specimens of this species within the municipality and may be a remnant of the original woodland.

Along the southern boundary fence are remnants of an old mulberry (Morus alba) grove. William Macarthur planted the first mulberry trees c. 1817 and may have been attempting to develop an early silk industry, since mulberry trees are a primary food source for silk worms. Descendants of the original mulberry plantings are located in paddocks along the western side of the blacksmith's shop and along the private road.

The small (token) vineyard planting of 500 grape vines (in five varieties) on the site of the horse yards/paddocks, is to commemorate the first commercial vineyard and winery in Australia, established at Camden Park in 1820, (experimental planting) and in full swing by 1830. William Macarthur is credited with the work of the vineyard. On the south are vines grown in the traditional method of the early 1800s, and on the left vines on the modern Trellis system.

In 1821 the Macarthurs built Belgenny Farm House, a timber 'cottage ornée' designed by Henry Kitchen. Kitchen also designed Hambledon Cottage at Elizabeth Farm, the family's estate at Parramatta, and a series of unbuilt mansions for their Pyrmont estate and Camden Park itself. The original cottage was later demolished and replaced by a poorly configured structure that led several architectural historians to mistakenly decry Kitchen's capacity as an architect. This later structure and the original related outbuildings, known as the 'Camden Park Home Farm', form one of the oldest surviving groups of farm structures in Australia. In 1832, after Macarthur had finally decided to make Camden the 'family seat', he commissioned architect John Verge to design a house of a stature suitable for one of the colony's leading and wealthiest families; previous designers employed by Macarthur included Edward Smith and Henry Cooper. The house was completed in 1835, shortly after John Macarthur's death in 1834. Sons James and William Macarthur took up occupancy in the new house, while their mother Elizabeth continued to reside at Elizabeth Farm at Parramatta, in which she had a life interest.

Zone 20 – River

Zone 20 is significant as it enabled early farm development in the region. This zone consists of the river and accompanying vegetation which has become despoiled on the banks through sand and soil mining. This has resulted in the banks becoming destabilised, causing weed infestation and a reduction in water quality. The spread of weed species has resulted in a loss of the river's role as a visual site boundary and wildlife corridor. Where the vegetation cover remains intact, a discrete corridor atmosphere is provided.

Rotolactor

"Seven miles out of Campbelltown, adjacent to the main Southern Railway at Menangle, the Camden Park Estate P/L has installed a Rotolactor which is designed to milk 2500 cows twice daily. A steel platform, 18 metres (60 ft) in diamenter is mounted on 20 steel wheels and revolves on two circular railways which rest on concrete walls 2 metres (6 ft) above the basement floor. The machinery is mounted underneath and revolves with the platform. An inclined ramp leads from the holding yards. The cows approach in correct order and enter slowly. As the platform revolves, milking commences using standard vacuum milking machines. After one revolution, the cows return to the holding yard via a ramp under the platform. Around the moving platform, the milk is collected in vacuum steel containers then emptied into a dump vat, pumped to the depot and within 90 seconds is chilled and ready for despatch to Sydney.

All cows on Camden Park are tested annually for tuberculosis (TB). All milk is guaranteed to be free from this disease. There is no charge for visitors and a milk bar operates at weekends or for organised parties when advice is given".

=== Condition ===
As at 30 July 2003, conservation during the 1980s by NSW Agriculture has enabled the timber structures to be preserved and many interpretative qualities remain intact. Belgenny Farm has high archaeological potential relative to historical landscapes and built structures.

The surrounding landscape, scenic views and remnant plantings are considerably intact and play a primary role in maintaining the integrity of the estate and adjoining landscapes Camden Park & Belgenny Farm Estate in particular has retained its integrity and intactness due to best practice conservation techniques.

=== Modifications and dates ===
- Since 1989 a new access road has been constructed, beginning from the east of the farm buildings and terminating at a visitor car park located at the northern end of the site. A timber and lattice structure has been built at the entry point to the estate and additional planting of avenue and screening trees has been developed. A "country style" garden has been landscaped around Reception Cottage and a demonstration vineyard to the north-east of the site has been established.
- In 2000 / 2001 Wollondilly Council prepared a Local Government Environmental Plan and Development Control Plan concerning a land release area at South Camden, on the western edge of Camden Park Estate's valley. The Heritage Office was involved in specifying controls to minimise the visual impact of housing on the valley.
- 2003–05: west of the Navigation Creek valley new urban development is in the process of being developed, the "Bridgewater Estate" development (on what was formerly the Dog Trap Paddock of the early estate). This continues the residential development of the suburb of Elizabeth Macarthur along Remembrance Drive. Apart from the prominent Camden Park Reservoir cylinder new houses are now highly visible from the central northern part of the EMAI lands. Other recent residential development is visible from the site to the south of Woodbridge Road, and west of Mount Taurus.
- 2005: a new Dairy complex is under construction over the Upper Navigation Creek Valley featuring the use of innovative technology.
- 2013: Old Orchard (EMAI): The orchard is depleted of fruit trees (I was told by an (EMAI) employee, Christine that all of the apple trees except one were grubbed out for an apple and pear bounty in decades past, the last one was much later felled by lightning).

No deciduous magnolias were found. A few oak trees (Quercus spp.) remain but some looked senescent. A cork oak (Q.suber) looked splendid although some nearby eucalypts might threaten it in due course. Three old camellias were present and one other was dead. All were (Camellia) japonicas and one of the three survivors had the characteristic brown sepals of the descendants of "Anemoniflora" which William Macarthur used as a seed parent. Maybe it will prove to be "Mariana". One would need to look in winter or early spring. As for magnolias, two clones of Magnolia grandiflora (bull bay/evergreen or southern magnolia) were present. Both are large and very old – one has improved its prospects for durability but sending down low branches to help anchor it against gales (see picture with Christine, an EMAI employee) whereas the other has started vigorously sending up root suckers. (Several photos sent, filed in objective file).

=== Further information ===
Belgenny Farm has a depth and complexity of cultural engagement and botanical history spanning two centuries of European settlement. It provides an important perspective on some of the most productive periods of the Camden Park Estate.

== Camden Park appearances in film ==
An iconic colonial house with large gardens and intact interiors, Camden Park has appeared several times in film and advertising, including the following:

- The 'Smiley' films (1956, 1958) which starred Chips Rafferty and Ralph Richardson, scenes from which were also filmed in the Camden area.
- The 1979 adaptation of Australian novelist Miles Franklin's 1901 novel My Brilliant Career as Five Bob Downs, the house of Harry Beecham. Notable scenes that feature the house and its contents include a formal dinner in the large dining room and a pillow fight between the central character Sybylla Melvyn, played by Judy Davis, and her potential husband Harry (Sam Neill) that proceeds down the house's main staircase, through the garden and along a long arbour known as the 'clivia walk', finishing on a grassed section below the rear lawn known as 'Blarney Bank'.
- Both exterior and interior scenes of Julia Leigh's film Sleeping Beauty (2011), starring Emily Browning, were filmed at the house, notably in the library and along the entrance drive where tall hedges of plumbago and bay create a shaded theatrical contrast to the brightly lit western front of the house with its Tuscan portico.

== Heritage listing ==
As at 10 March 2006, the Camden Park Estate is of social, historic, scientific and aesthetic significance to NSW and Australia. It shows a high degree of technical and creative excellence being a rare, and still relatively intact, example of a model rural estate of the early 19th century (continuing to serve this function until the 1950s). It is the oldest pastoral sheep stud in Australia.

The estate's considerable social and historic significance is also due to its ability to demonstrate the way of life, tastes, customs and functions of a 19th – early 20th century rural establishment. From its establishment the site was a particularly fine example of a colonial rural estate and served as a prototype for other 19th century estates. The intactness of the site's structures and their landscape settings enhances its role as a relatively unique survivor and as a site of archaeological and scientific importance.

The site also has significance through its historical associations with the Macarthur family – from its establishment by John and Elizabeth Macarthur in the early 19th century to the present day Macarthur-Stanham family – this relationship shown in both landscape and structures and being well documented and researched.

By the 1830s the estate of 11,331 hectares (28,000 acres) included the greatest and most advanced mixed farm in NSW, at a time when Australian wools had almost ousted continental wools from British usage and the British manufacturers had a vast ascendancy in the world's woollen markets

Its extensive grounds planted in the tradition of 19th century English landscape parks holds a major botanical collection and its large, exceptional collection of rural buildings is especially important because of both the quality and rarity of the group.

The Camden Park orchard site and cottages area contains the remnants of an early commercial and scientific horticultural collection which was established by William Macarthur and made a contribution to commercial horticulture in NSW and other colonies such as South Australia. The cottages are an integral part of the orchard complex which continued to function commercially until for 150 years and are important 19th century elements of the landscape.

Camden Park played a vital role in the fledgling Australian wine industry through its importation and distribution of vine cuttings throughout NSW and the Barossa Valley of SA. By 1853 Camden Park listed some 33 grape varieties for sale. By 1841 William & James were producing more than 23,000 litres; 6,000 US gallons (5,000 imp gal) and that vintage won gold medals in England. In 1844 24,000 vine cuttings were sent from Camden Park to Adelaide, setting South Australia on a path to becoming an internationally acclaimed wine growing district. Camden Park became world-renowned for the quality of its wine and by 1845 was producing around 45,000 litres; 12,000 US gallons (10,000 imp gal) per annum as a serious vineyard and one of the most highly regarded in the colony and with quite a reputation overseas.

James & William Macarthur managed the estate with great enterprise, importing expert workers: Australia's first skilled wool-sorter from Silesia, shepherds from Scotland, vignerons from Nassau and dairymen from Dorset. They installed the first irrigation plant in Australia in 1830 and the first sheep wash and wool press. After changes of soil and climate in 1849 dictated sale of their merino stud, wheat was the stable until the mid-1860s. But rust and labour shortage led to a change to mixed farming – sheep and cattle fattening, mixed grains, wine, horses for India until 1857, and Australia's largest plant and tree nursery. The 2000 specimens of plants, shrubs and trees included the country's premier collections of domestic orchids and camellias, both of which William Macarthur was one of the first to introduce into Australia.

Two vineyards were planted in 1830 and 1841 and produced up to 73,000 litres; 19,000 US gallons (16,000 imp gal) a year including choice vintages, with as much as 140,000 litres; 36,000 US gallons (30,000 imp gal) in cellar sometimes. In 1832 the estate exported the first Australian brandy, and had 8 vintage and fortified wines varying from Muscat to Riesling at the Paris Exhibition of 1861. Also in the 1830s William Macarthur pioneered processes of drying fruit, "with which the British Isles were unacquainted". In 1857 Camden Park had a variety of all normal species of orchard fruits and nuts, 56 varieties of apple including cider making types, 31 kinds of pear, 23 citrus fruit varieties including Navel oranges, 16 table grapes apart from 32 wine varieties. Apricots, plums, cherries, quinces, figs, chestnuts, almonds and strawberries were also grown on the estate.

The Camden Park garden and nursery is historically important as part of the original Macarthur family Camden estate. The garden is significant for its demonstration of the early nineteenth century estate garden design, including the following: The use of a hill site to take advantage of the views; the use of plantings to enframe views; and the planting of trees with ornamental form, demonstrating the influence of the early nineteenth century horticultural movement. The area has historical significance as the original Macarthur nursery renowned for the introduction and propagation of exotic plants in early Australia. Significant features include the following: the area of olive and plumbago shrubbery; the brick edged gravel carriage loop; structured vistas from the house entrance and garden entrance; specimen plants of araucarias and camellias reputed to be the oldest in Australia; well blended later additions of herbaceous beds and rose garden; and ruins of the gardener's lodge, potting sheds and hothouses from the original nursery period.

Finally the estate is of major landscape and environmental significance as a significant area of open space lining the Nepean River with landmark landscape features including the tree lined river meadows, ridge top Belgenny Farm Group, the driveways and the relic orchard and plantations site on the flood plain north-east of the mansion.

Camden Park House is of historic and aesthetic significance as one of the finest of the nation's early 19th century country homesteads. More particularly it is an outstanding exemplar of Australia's Colonial Regency style of architecture, this significance being enhanced by the quality of the design and craftsmanship and the degree to which it has retained important original fabric and features. The building is generally regarded as one of architect John Verge's finest achievements. The house's historic significance is also due in large measure to its role as the home of the Macarthur family from the days of John and Elizabeth, through a direct line of descendants to the present.

Belgenny Farm and Camden Park Estate has historical, aesthetic, social and technical/research significance at local, state and national levels as the oldest, intact, rural landscape and group of farm buildings in Australia, with close associations with the Macarthur family. Belgenny Farm and Camden Park Estate was instrumental and influential in the development of this country's agricultural, pastoral, horticultural and viticultural industries.

It is both representative of the evolution of many rural industrial technologies and a rare example of a remnant colonial farm within the Cumberland Plain where many of its scenic qualities have survived intact. Belgenny Farm and Camden Park Estate has important associations with key figures in the history of New South Wales, particularly John and Elizabeth Macarthur, their sons James and William, and Mrs Elizabeth Macarthur-Onslow.

As an unusually intact record of farm building construction techniques and rural technological change, Belgenny Farm and Camden Park Estate has enormous educational and interpretive potential for current and future generations of Australians.

Aesthetically, Camden Park Estate is in a setting of bucolic charm, symbolic plantings and important vistas with the added significance of the Macarthur family cemetery with its monuments and Belgenny Farm's timber vernacular buildings. The entire estate is considered to be an ongoing agricultural property of social significance.

Camden Park Estate and Belgenny Farm was listed on the New South Wales State Heritage Register on 22 December 2006 having satisfied the following criteria.

The place is important in demonstrating the course, or pattern, of cultural or natural history in New South Wales.

Camden Park & Belgenny Farm Estate is historically significant at a State level because it shows evidence of significant human activity in the agricultural industries. Camden Park & Belgenny Farm Estate shows continuity of agricultural activity over the bulk of European history of New South Wales.

The place has a strong or special association with a person, or group of persons, of importance of cultural or natural history of New South Wales's history.

Camden Park & Belgenny Farm Estate is at the same time rare because it provides evidence of a defunct way of life and agricultural practices, as well as being a scarce example of its type and showing unusually accurate evidence of significant human activities. The existing fabric of the Estate, including the hamlets, cottages and other existing farm structures and agricultural landscape demonstrate a philosophy of rural development and colonisation derived from European theory. Camden Park & Belgenny Farm Estate and the surrounding Estate demonstrate overlays of the continual pattern of human use and occupation associated with the evolution of rural life in NSW.

The place is important in demonstrating aesthetic characteristics and/or a high degree of creative or technical achievement in New South Wales.

Camden Park & Belgenny Farm Estate is aesthetically significant, which includes visual links between Belgenny, the cemetery, the mansion, the riverine and ridgetop vegetation as well as external elements such as St. Johns at Camden and the village of Menangle represent a major piece of intellectually determined landscape design. Camden Park & Belgenny Farm Estate has strong visual and sensory appeal arising from its landscape setting, the quality of its vernacular agricultural buildings and the continuing presence of farm animals. The buildings are aesthetically distinctive and have landmark qualities. The farm buildings demonstrate distinctive attributes in their form and composition as well as demonstrating technical excellence and innovation for their period. The Macarthur family cemetery is prominently sited with strong visual links to other important points within the Camden Park Estate. The graveyard has emotive qualities arising from its garden setting and historic atmosphere.

The place has a strong or special association with a particular community or cultural group in New South Wales for social, cultural or spiritual reasons.

Camden Park & Belgenny Farm Estate is socially significant at a State level because it is held in high esteem by significant groups within the contemporary community of New South Wales. Together with the Macarthur family cemetery and adjoining lands, the area has special cultural, social, spiritual, aesthetic and educational values and associations which set it apart from other sites.

The place has potential to yield information that will contribute to an understanding of the cultural or natural history of New South Wales.

Camden Park & Belgenny Farm Estate and surrounds satisfies all the guidelines for technical and research significance since it has yielded and has the potential to yield substantial historical, cultural, technical and archaeological information about the history of agriculture in NSW and the lives and occupations of the people who worked there. As such, it is an important reference site and shows evidence of past technologies at a representative and rare level. The property has a useful research and educational role in helping us to understand our agricultural heritage.

The place possesses uncommon, rare or endangered aspects of the cultural or natural history of New South Wales.

Camden Park & Belgenny Farm Estate is rare because of its scarcity value and the accuracy of the evidence it displays. Belgenny Farm is the oldest surviving complex of farm buildings in Australia due to its combination of age, size, complexity, evidence of evolving technologies and uses set it apart from other places. The estate is a rare example of Australian participation in international horticultural and botanical exchange in the 19th century.

The place is important in demonstrating the principal characteristics of a class of cultural or natural places/environments in New South Wales.

Camden Park & Belgenny Farm Estate is representative as an optimal example of colonial life in New South Wales in the first half of the 19th century. It also represents agricultural, viticultural and horticultural evolution and the dominant part which the Macarthur family played in the development of the colony and its infant primary industries. The estate is representative of Government patronage in return for favours, the pioneering spirit and continual family relationships and evolution.
