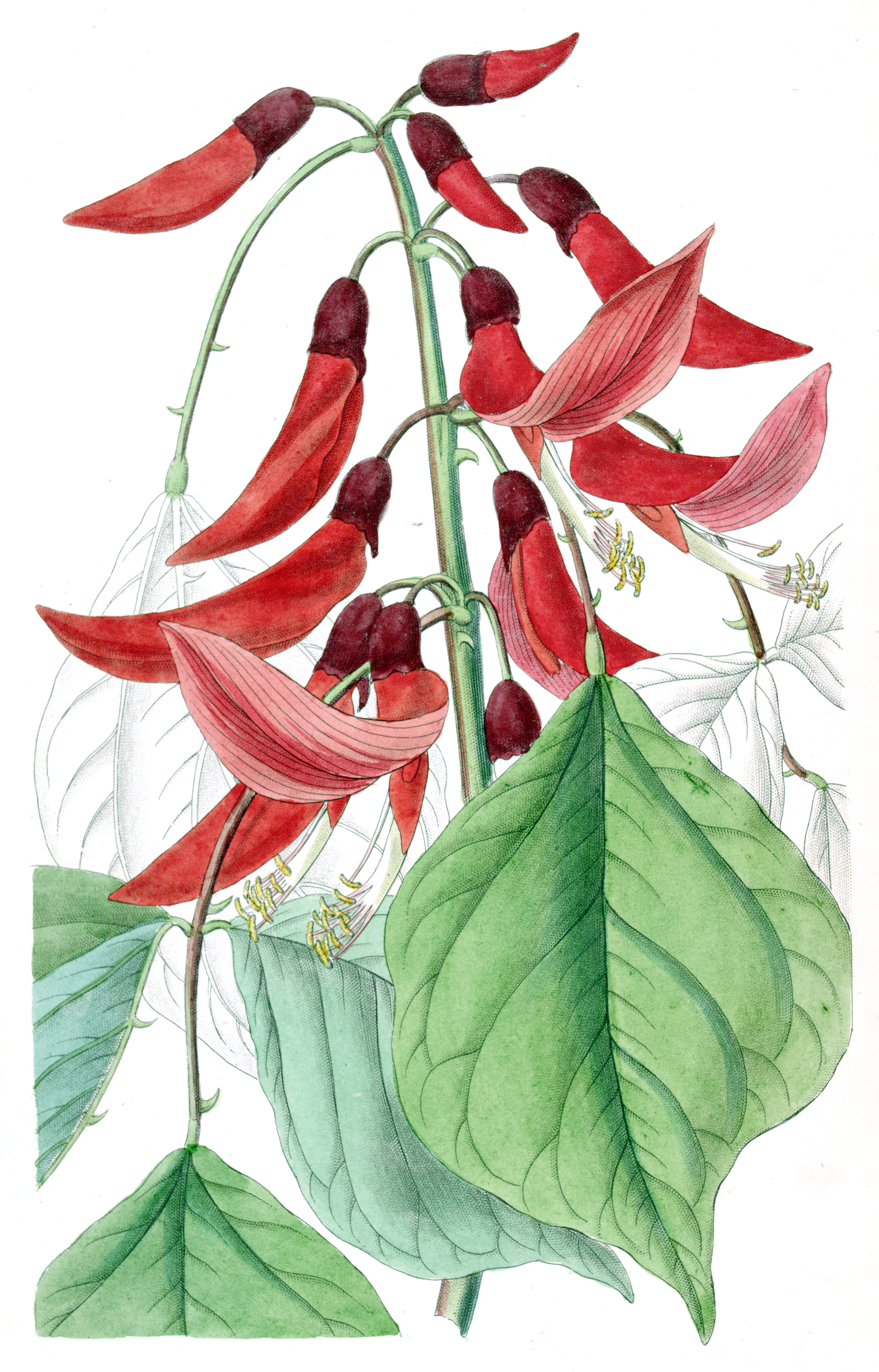
- Erythrina × bidwillii 'Camdeni' — as first illustrated in Edwards' Botanical Register, April 1847.

Scientific classification
- Kingdom: Plantae
- Clade: Tracheophytes
- Clade: Angiosperms
- Clade: Eudicots
- Clade: Rosids
- Order: Fabales
- Family: Fabaceae
- Subfamily: Faboideae
- Genus: Erythrina
- Species: E. × bidwillii

Binomial name
- Erythrina × bidwillii Lindl.

= Erythrina × bidwillii =

Hybrid legume

Erythrina × bidwillii is the scientific name for two different cultivars produced from hybridising Erythrina species at Camden Park Estate, New South Wales, Australia, in the early 1840s by William Macarthur, one of the most active and influential horticulturists in Australia.

The two different cultivars resulted from two separate crossings of Erythrina herbacea L. (female) with Erythrina crista-galli L. (male):

- Erythrina × bidwillii Lindl. 'Camdeni'
- Erythrina × bidwillii Lindl. 'Blakei'

Although the flowers of both cultivars are similar, the form of the plants is different — one is a small tree, while the other is a shrub.

== Botanical description ==
Depending on the cultivar, they are either shrubs or small trees. Leaflets 5–10 cm long, generally ovate-elliptic as in Erythrina crista-galli and occasionally with a single prickle.

Flowers to 5 cm long, in characteristic long, deep blood red clusters; standards about 4–5 cm long, relatively narrow, about 1–1.5 cm wide. Sepals in a bell-shaped slightly split tube, mostly as long as or slightly longer than wide. Stamens with upper half protruding from the keels in mature flowers.

== Erythrina × bidwillii 'Camdeni' ==
The original name of Erythrina × bidwillii 'Camdeni' was Erythrina camdeni or 'Erythrina camdenensis' — the 'Camden Coral Tree' so called by William Macarthur. It was named after John Bidwill, by John Lindley, after an initial description by Bidwill's friend William Herbert, simply because he, Bidwill, first took it to England in 1843. Bidwill had no other association with its breeding.

The Macarthur family published an annual catalogue of their plants. Exports were also listed in this publication, with the 1845 edition noting that William Macarthur sent two hybrid coral trees known as Erythrina camdenensis to Conrad Loddiges and Sons, a well known Hackney nurseryman in London. This coral tree is believed to be the first Australian hybrid garden plant to be published in England, in 1847.

== Erythrina × bidwillii 'Blakei' ==
Erythrina × bidwillii 'Blakei', was grown from the same F1 hybrid cross, and still grows in the gardens at Camden Park. This was named by Macarthur after his convict gardener Edmund Blake, who was probably responsible for making the cross, which, incidentally was the first hybrid to be produced anywhere in the world between woody leguminous plants. It was described in a monograph on Erythrina as, "the best known and biologically most successful hybrid erythrina," which adds, "it seems likely that not all the races grown today under the name are descendants of the original cross". There is some variation in the size of flowers and the intensity of their colouration.

== Cultivation and propagation ==
Erythrina × bidwillii 'Camdeni' tends to follow its Erythrina crista-galli parent in forming a small tree, while Erythrina × bidwillii 'Blakei' follows the Erythrina herbacea parent in being a low-growing shrub, dying back to a rootstock each year.

Both Erythrina × bidwillii cultivars are totally sterile hybrids that can be raised from cuttings, with some difficulty. It is more propagated by grafting onto seedlings of Erythrina crista-galli, one of their parents.
