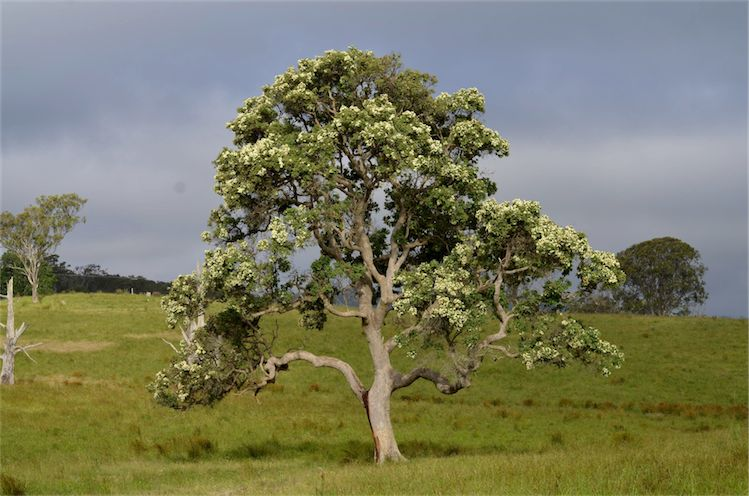
- Near Tenterfield

Conservation status
- Least Concern (IUCN 3.1)

Scientific classification
- Kingdom: Plantae
- Clade: Tracheophytes
- Clade: Angiosperms
- Clade: Eudicots
- Clade: Rosids
- Order: Myrtales
- Family: Myrtaceae
- Genus: Angophora
- Species: A. subvelutina

Binomial name
- Angophora subvelutina F.Muell.
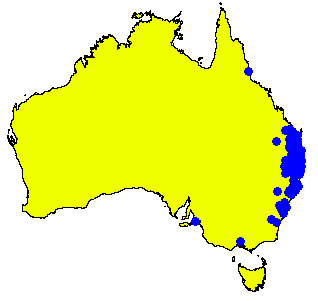
- Occurrence data from AVH

Synonyms
- Angophora velutina F.Muell.orth. var.; Eucalyptus subvelutina (F.Muell.) Brooker

= Angophora subvelutina =

Broad-leaved apple

Species of tree

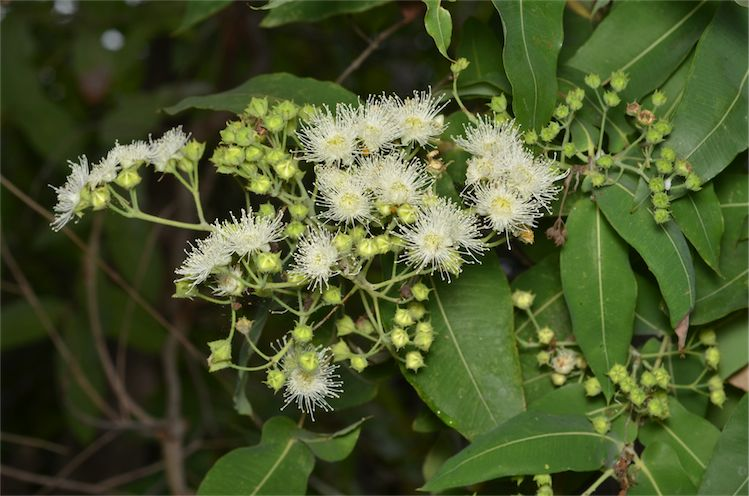
Flower buds and flowers

Angophora subvelutina, commonly known as the broad-leaved apple, is a species of tree that is endemic to eastern Australia. It has rough bark on the trunk and branches, lance-shaped to egg-shaped or elliptical adult leaves, flower buds in groups of three or seven, white or creamy white flowers and ribbed, cup-shaped fruit.

== Description ==
Angophora subvelutina is a tree that typically grows to a height of 17–25 m (56–82 ft) and forms a lignotuber. It has rough, fibrous or flaky, greyish bark on the trunk and branches. Young plants and coppice regrowth have sessile, egg-shaped to elliptical or lance-shaped leaves that are 50–110 mm (2.0–4.3 in) long and 25–50 mm (1.0–2.0 in) wide arranged in opposite pairs with a stem-clasping base. Adult leaves are also arranged in opposite pairs, paler on the lower surface, lance-shaped to egg-shaped or elliptical, 60–120 mm (2.4–4.7 in) long and 20–50 mm (0.8–2.0 in) wide with a stem-clasping base. The flower buds are arranged on the ends of branchlets on a branched peduncle 9–30 mm (0.4–1.2 in) long, each branch of the peduncle with three or seven buds on pedicels 4–10 mm (0.2–0.4 in) long. Mature buds are globe-shaped, 4–6 mm (0.16–0.24 in) long and wide with a ribbed floral cup. The petals are white or creamy white with a green keel, about 3 mm (0.12 in) long and 3–4 mm (0.12–0.16 in) wide. Flowering occurs from November to January and the fruit is a cup-shaped capsule 8–11 mm (0.3–0.4 in) long and 6–11 mm (0.2–0.4 in) wide with ribbed sides and the valves enclosed in the fruit.

== Taxonomy and naming ==
Angophora subvelutina was first formally described in 1858 by Ferdinand von Mueller in his book Fragmenta phytographiae Australiae. The specific epithet subvelutina is from Latin, and it translates to 'almost velvety'.

== Distribution and habitat ==
Broad-leaved apple grows in open forest in alluvial soil and gravelly clay. It is found mainly in near-coastal areas from near Bundaberg in Queensland and south to near Taree and disjunctly to near Araluen in New South Wales.

== Conservation status ==
The IUCN Red List assesses the species as Least Concern.

== Uses ==
The 1889 book The Useful Native Plants of Australia records that "The Rev. Dr. Wolls states that these 'apple trees' are sometimes cut down to keep cattle alive in dry seasons, as the leaves are relished by them."
