= Grey Box Reserve =

Nature reserves in Australia

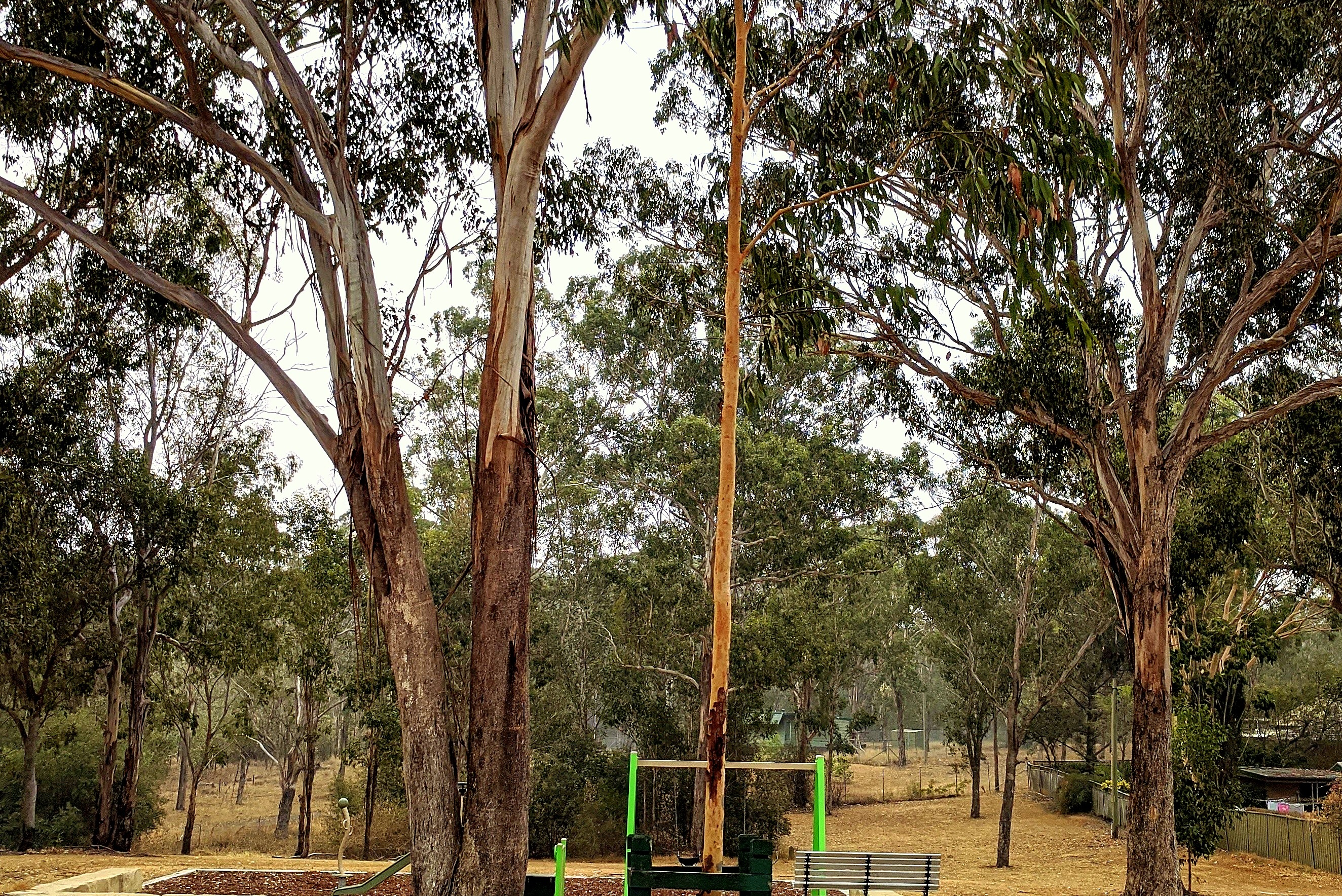
- Boothtown Reserve, just south of the contiguous Grey Box Reserve
- Interactive map of Grey Box Reserve
- Type: Nature reserve
- Location: Greystanes, New South Wales, Australia
- Coordinates: 33°49′33″S 150°55′53″E
- Area: 6.5 hectares (16 acres)
- Operator: Cumberland City Council
- Status: Closed for public

The Grey Box Reserve, or Greystanes Grey Box Reserve, is a small nature reserve and an urban forest situated in the suburb of Greystanes, New South Wales in Western Sydney, Australia. A remnant bushland of the Cumberland Plain Woodland, it mainly features native vegetation. The reserve is so-named because of its abundance of Eucalyptus moluccana, reflecting the pre-European cultural landscape of the area.

== Geography ==
The reserve is bounded by Silverthorne Road to the west in Pemulwuy and Greystanes Road to the east. The form of the Reserve is typical of the soft undulating hills of the Cumberland Plain, and is located largely on a gentle west-facing slope inside a small water catchment that transiently drains southwards to Prospect. It is a reasonably disturbed bushland with regions of low, moderate and high resiliency, and areas of moderate to high weed invasion with the soil being clay that is derived from Wianamatta Shale Group. The reserve is primarily composed of Shale Hills Woodland, an ecological constituent of the Cumberland Plain Woodland.

The Reserve is connected to five main environment corridors of remnant vegetation and fauna habitats within the vicinity, such as Gipps Road and Hyland Road Regional Parklands to the south, the Lower Prospect Canal Reserve Cycleway which features disjunct patches of CPW and Alluvial Woodland, Prospect Creek and the Alluvial Woodland within the Long Street Park, the Prospect Reservoir woodland to the west and Greystanes Creek, which ties the Reserve to the major habitat corridors within the City of Parramatta including Toongabbie Creek, Quarry Branch Creek and Lake Parramatta.

== Biota ==
Native species include Pimelea spicata and eucalyptus sp., though ground cover is covered by a mixture of exotic and native grasses. The main weeds found in the reserve are, Olea europaea subsp. cuspidata and Lantana camara in the mid storey, in addition to grass and annual weeds in the ground cover, such as Eragrostis curvula.

Native animals include three frog species such as Litoria aurea, five reptile species, sixteen mammal species, over fifty bird species, and as well as six exotic mammal species. Bats found in the reserve include Tadarida australis, Petaurus norfolcensis, Falsistrellus tasmaniensis, Scoteanax rueppellii, Pteropus poliocephalus, Mormopterus norfolkensis, Mormopterus sp., Chalinolobus gouldii and Scotorepens orion. Owls featured are Tyto novaehollandiae and Ninox strenua. Meridolum corneovirens is also present.

In 2003, hollow bearing logs and artificial bat boxes were installed in some of the trees to supply extra perching sites for microchiropteran bats and other cavernous-dependent fauna.

== Access ==
The reserve is closed to public access, therefore there are no walking tracks in the area nor any recreational access; a 1.8-meter-tall (5.9 ft) chain-wire fence exists along the southern and eastern boundary of the reserve on Greystanes Road, in addition to a three-strand wire perimeter fence on some of the other boundaries of the reserve. Though a walking track from Silverthorne Road does edge through the northwestern boundary of the reserve.

Boothtown Reserve, an abutting park that features a children's playground, is situated on the southern perimeter of the reserve and features homogenous vegetation. The reserve features tracks for firefighters, provided that a bushfire should start in the reserve or hazard reduction burns.

== See also ==
- Prospect Hill
- Prospect Nature Reserve
- Boothtown Aqueduct
- Gipps Road and Hyland Road Regional Parklands
- Marrong Reserve
