= Greystanes =

Suburb of Sydney, New South Wales, Australia

- Suburb
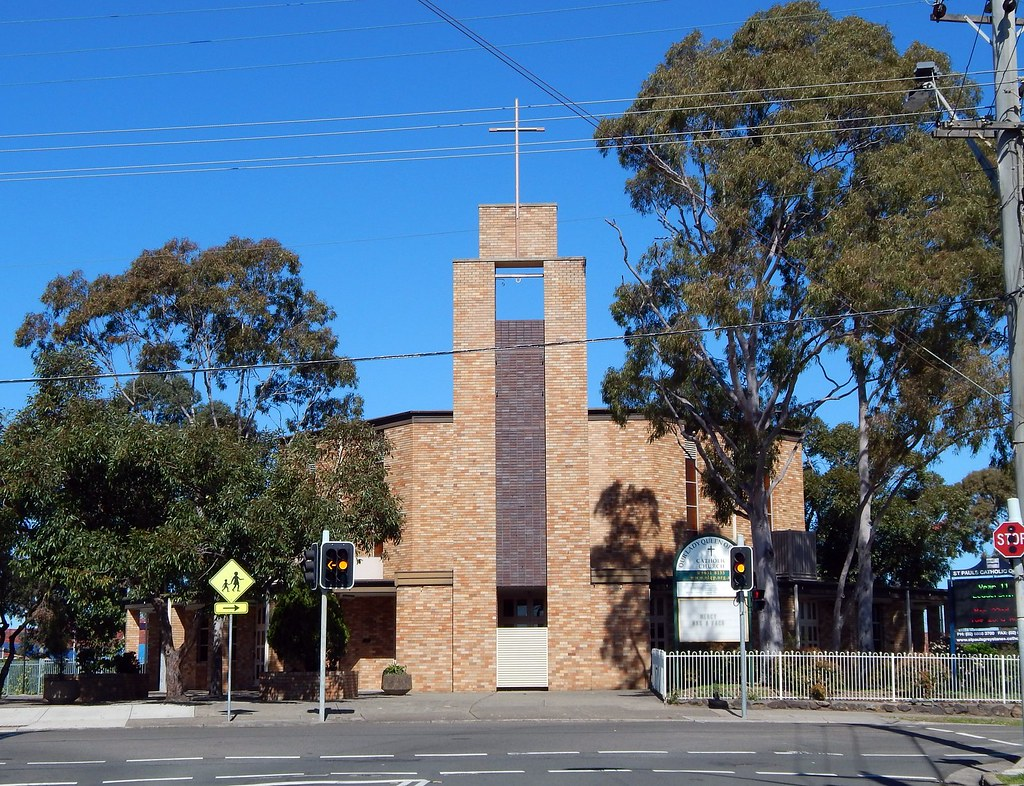
- Our Lady Queen of Peace Catholic Church

- Interactive map of Greystanes
- Coordinates: 33°49′24″S 150°56′37″E
- Country: Australia
- State: New South Wales
- Region: Western Sydney
- City: Greater Western Sydney
- LGA: Cumberland Council
- Location: 25 km (16 mi) west of Sydney CBD
- Established: 1799

Government
  - State electorates: Prospect; Granville
  - Federal divisions: McMahon; Parramatta

Area
  - Total: 9 km^{2} (3.5 sq mi)
- Elevation: 57 m (187 ft)

Population
  - Total: 23,511 (SAL 2021)
- Postcode: 2145
- County: Cumberland
Suburbs around Greystanes
Girraween	Pendle Hill	South Wentworthville
Pemulwuy	Greystanes	Merrylands West
Wetherill Park	Smithfield	Woodpark

Greystanes is a suburb in Greater Western Sydney, New South Wales, Australia. Greystanes is located 25 kilometres west of the Sydney central business district in the local government area of Cumberland Council. Founded in the late 1790s, Greystanes is one of the oldest suburbs in Sydney.

== History ==
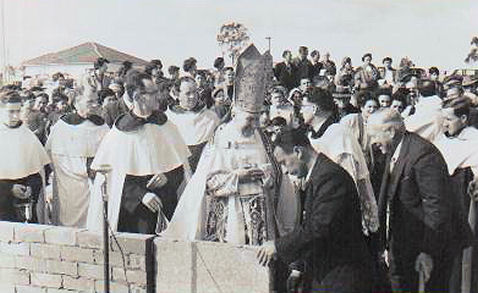
Frank Cefai laying the first stone at St Simon Stock Catholic Church.

In the early years of British settlement the area was known as Prospect Hill and was the site of the first land grants to emancipated convicts in 1791. From 1800 to 1840, the division of Darug lands into 'Crown Land Grants' was awarded to officials, military, free settlers and emancipists to farm. In this period, it was one of several areas of conflict between the Darug people and the settlers, the Darug people being led for many years of guerrilla warfare by Pemulwuy.

Greystanes began as a rural suburb in the 1850s and remained so until the 1880s. The suburb was occupied mainly by large estates designed as rural retreats for gentlemen farmers, including Charles Whalan and Nelson Lawson. The area became differentiated into Prospect to the west of Greystanes Creek, and Greystanes to the east of the Creek.

The name 'Grey Stanes', given by Nelson Lawson, came from the outcrops of basalt on Prospect Hill, "Grey" being its colour and "Stanes" being the Scottish word for stones. The land was originally granted to William Cummings in 1799, before being acquired by the famed Blue Mountains explorer William Lawson in approximately 1810.

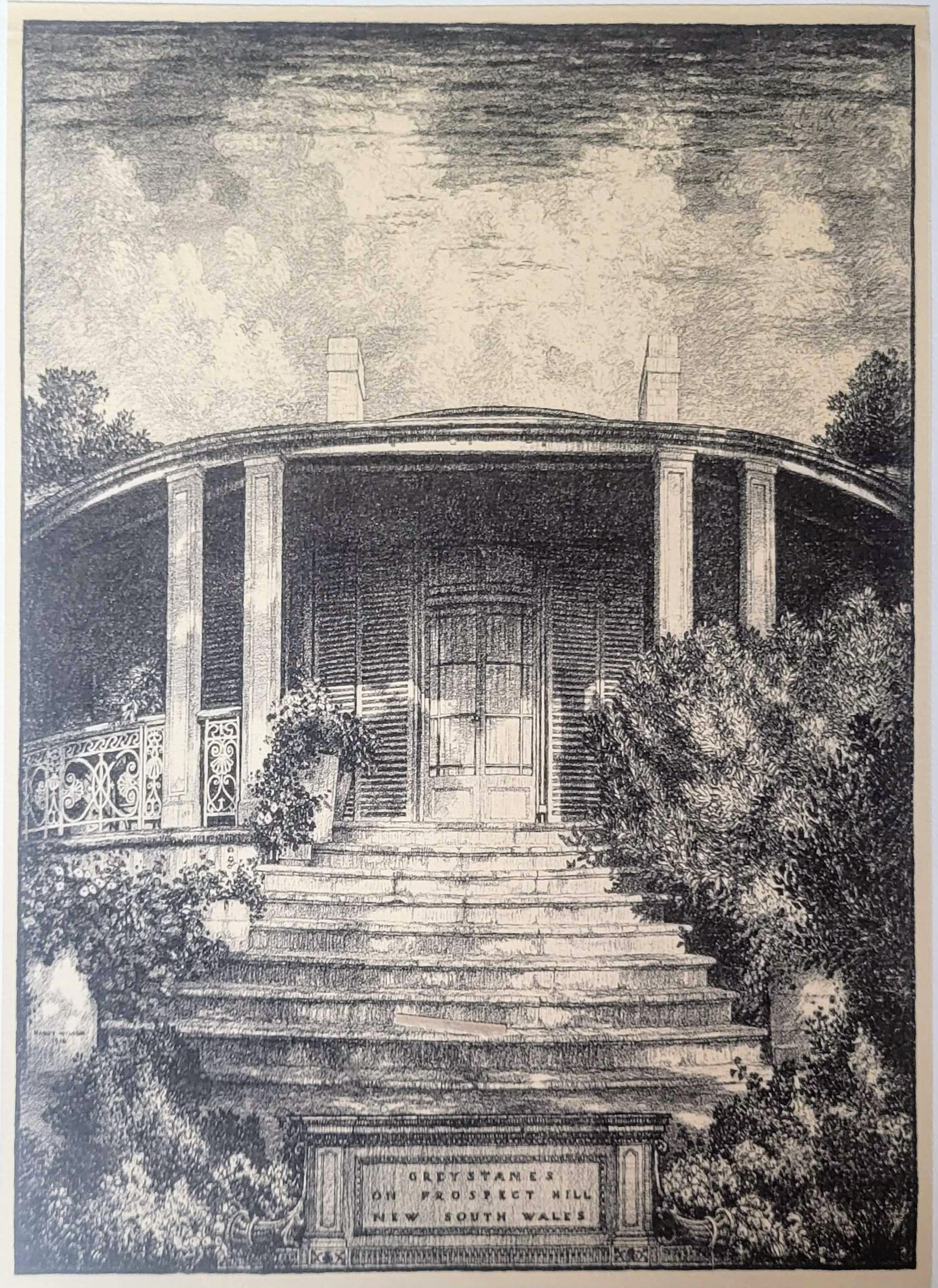
The original residence in Grey Stanes, NSW

In 1836, ‘Greystanes House’ was built by Nelson Simmons Lawson, on land given to him by his father, on the eastern side of Prospect Hill. In 1942, Greystanes House was resumed for military use for World War 2. The building was demolished in 1946, but its gates still remain intact on Greystanes Road.

In 1880, the Upper Nepean Scheme commenced to provide Sydney with a reliable water supply. Vast areas of land were resumed for the project including William Lawson's estate. The army of labourers involved in the construction phases camped in a virtual ‘tent city’ at near Hyland Road. The Prospect and Potts Hill Reservoirs, Boothtown Aqueduct and Lower Prospect Canal Reserve were completed in 1888.

Greystanes was officially recognised as a suburb in 1922.

The Greystanes area was used for poultry farming throughout the twentieth century. Frank Cefai, a Maltese migrant, was a well known developer who built hundreds of residential homes and infrastructure throughout Greystanes and its surrounding suburbs. In 1973, Frank was the main contribution to the record year of development applications at Holroyd Council for Greystanes and its surrounding suburbs.

In the early 1950s, the Maltese community, in particular Father Camilleri, raised donations to help Wenthworthville parish purchase the land from a poultry farmer, upon the highest hill of Greystanes to build a new Catholic church, school and parish. Frank Cefai began the construction of St Simon Stock Catholic Church. Dams were filled in and poultry sheds were knocked down. The original St Simon Stock Catholic Church is located where the current science block of St Paul's Catholic High School is. This church was also used as the classrooms for the St Simon Stock Primary and High School.

The St Simon Stock primary school was completed in 1958 and its all boys high school in 1962. As well as parish buildings and a nuns convent. Frank Cefai built and helped fund the Our Lady Queen of Peace Catholic Church and these surrounding primary and secondary schools and parish buildings. In 1975, Frank Cefai completed the construction of Our Lady Queen of Peace church.

From 1957 to 1965, the Parish was cared for by the Maltese Carmelite Fathers and Our Lady Queen of Peace Primary School was run by the Sisters of Mercy. From 1965 to 1988, The Dominican Sisters of Malta ran OLQP Primary School. Their Dominican Order coat of arms forms the OLQP logo. The Blessed Imelda Convent at OLQP Primary School was closed in 1988 and moved to St. Dominic Hostel, in Blacktown, Sydney (which was built by Frank Cefai); leaving OLQP a fully staffed lay school.

=== Pan Pacific Scout Jamboree (1952-53) ===
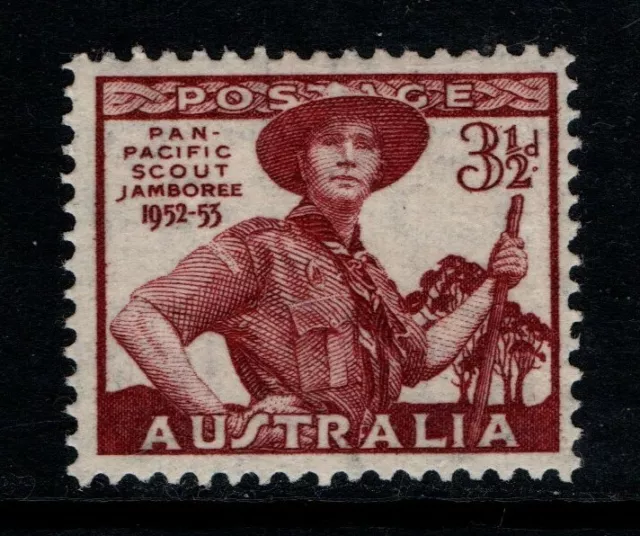
An original Commemorative Pan-Pacific Scout Jamboree postage stamp from 1952

Between 29 December 1952 and 9 January 1953, more than 11,000 scouts converged on Greystanes to attend the Pan Pacific Scout Jamboree. Attendees came from all Australian states plus 16 other countries, including New Zealand, United Kingdom, Papua New Guinea, Hong Kong, Iceland, Malaya, Singapore, Ceylon, Philippines, Fiji, Nauru and Malta; to participate in a full camp program.

John Frederick Colquhoun represented The Boy Scouts Association Imperial Headquarters and its Chief Scout of the British Commonwealth and Empire.

== Culture ==
The Greystanes area was dubbed “Little Malta” by the Sydney Sun newspaper due to the influx of Maltese migrants since the 1910s who had settled in the area and taken up poultry farming or market gardening. By 1932, 30% of the produce sold at the Sydney fruit and vegetable markets was supplied by Maltese market gardeners. Gozo Road, Greystanes is named after Gozo – the second largest Island in Malta.

Baiada Chickens, Cordina Farms and Pace Farm Eggs; were founded and operated by local members of the Greystanes Maltese community.

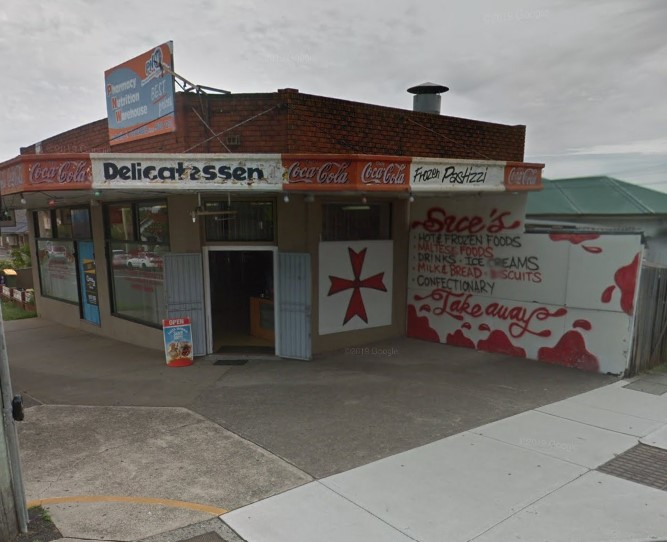
Former Maltese corner shop in front of OLQP Catholic Church, corner of Ettalong Rd & Old Prospect Rd

The Maltese Club, previously owned by the Catholic Church, was located on the current site of Genista Aged Care Facility at 185 Old Prospect Road. The former corner shop across the road from the Catholic church, was one of many Maltese stores in the area, which sold pastizzi, kinnie and ravioli. There was also The Maltese Herald newspaper, founded by Nicholas Bonello, Vincent Pisani and Lawrence Dimech in 1961. The Maltese Herald ran for fifty-two years with its final edition in 2013.

Greystanes still has a large Maltese Australian community. The Maltese began a strong culture of Christmas lights and nativity sets in Greystanes. There are still displays annually, every December throughout Greystanes.

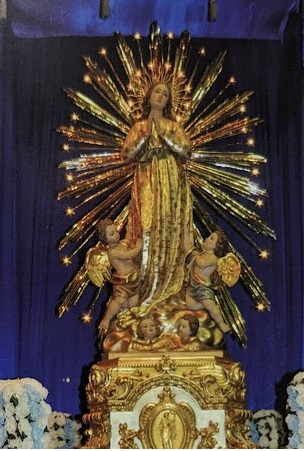
Our Lady of Victories on display for the Maltese Festa, in Our Lady Queen of Peace Church, Greystanes

In 1965, the fourth centenary of the Great Siege of Malta, the statue of Our Lady of Victories (il-Bambina - a patron saint of Malta) arrived in Greystanes to the great joy of the Maltese; not only from the immediate area, but also from many other parts of Sydney. She is the centrepiece of the Greystanes Catholic Community and Our Lady Queen of Peace church, and is the centrepiece of the annual Maltese Festa procession. She is a hand crafted statue from Bolzano, Italy; a replica of il-Bambina from Gozo, commissioned and funded by the Greystanes Maltese Community. Il-Vitorja or Victory Day, is a Maltese public holiday that commemorates the end of the great siege of Malta in 1565 and the end of World War II. It also coincides with the commemoration of the birth of the Virgin Mary (il-Bambina). Hereby giving the traditional name to this statue (Our Lady Queen of Victories) and festival (Festa tal-Vitorja).

The first procession in honour of Our Lady in the parish was held in 1962, under the title of Our Lady of Lourdes. However, since the arrival of the statue, the Maltese community have celebrated an annual Festa (il-Vitorja & il-Bambina) every October since 1965, in and around the Catholic Church (as every village in Malta traditionally does).

Our Lady Queen of Peace church and parish was intended to be named and dedicated to Our Lady of Victories, in honour of the aforementioned statue. However, despite hundreds of years of tradition surrounding this statue, the clergy of the Roman Catholic Diocese of Parramatta deemed it incorrect to have the moniker Victories attached to Our Lady. The church and parish were to be known as Our Lady Queen of Peace, when Frank Cefai finished construction in 1975. The statue of Our Lady of Victories is on display inside Our Lady Queen of Peace Catholic Church. She is carried by hand, traditionally, at the annual procession of the OLQP Maltese Festa. The statue is accompanied by the Maltese Concert Band of NSW, who also perform the ongoing celebrations.

A pioneer to the Maltese community in Greystanes, the longest serving member and president of the Greystanes Maltese festa, continuously for over 50 years, is Joe Spiteri. Having joined in 1966.

A scripted Maltese-Australian horror drama series called Greystanes, was released via 18 short story episodes exclusively on TikTok, in 2024. A recipient of Screen Australia, NZ On Air and TikTok's Every Voice initiative, the series adapts Malta's Ħaddiela stories. The Greystanes series is directed by AACTA nominated filmmaker Ryan Cauchi and co-written by Matt Ferro (The Matrix, Happy Feet).

== Heritage listings ==
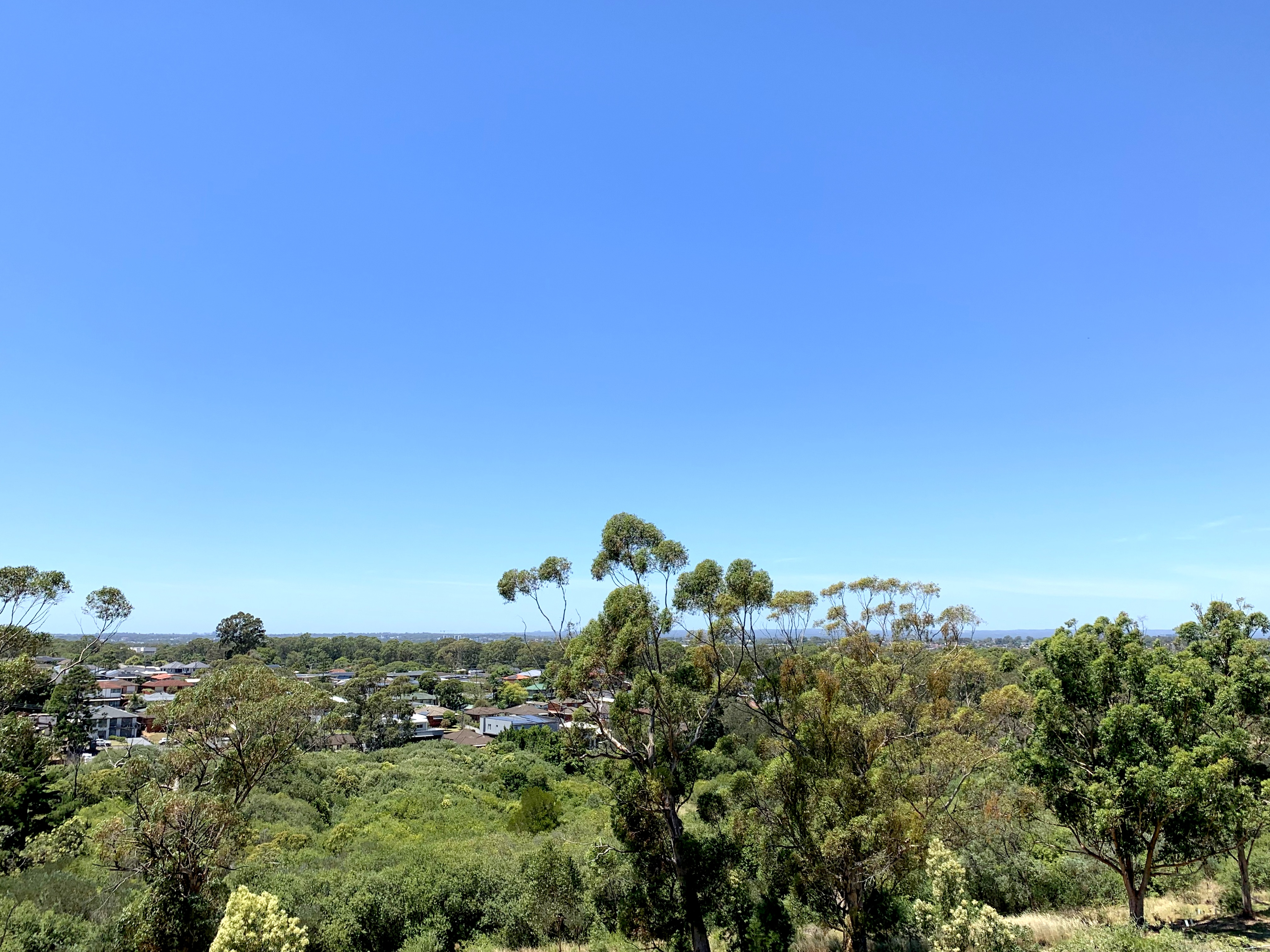
Greystanes residential area as viewed from the northwest at Pemulwuy

Greystanes has a number of heritage-listed sites, which include:

- Boothtown Aqueduct, bridge and Lower Prospect Canal Reserve
- Former farm, Widemere post office and inn at Gipps Road and Hyland Road Regional Parklands - built before 1897. The only farm group left in the area, demonstrating the former dairying industry in Greystanes. It was socially significant for its former functions within the local community, as a post office and inn.
- Late Victorian suburban cottage with only minor external modifications, located at 15 Bayfield Road
- Ringrose Primary School
- Grey Box Reserve, a nature reserve
- Prospect Hill
- The original gates to Greystanes House, located on Greystanes Road.
- Remnant Tree Stands at Damien Avenue (Gallard Reserve Woodland) - one of the six indigenous forest communities in Sydney, this is a small collection of plants and shrubs, mostly Forest Red Gum (E. teraticornis) and Grey Box (E. Moluccana). It has been preserved from regular mowing and urban development for its purpose as an ecological resource to the local wildlife, as well as to preserve a rare endangered ecological community. Currently, less than 6% of the Woodlands remain in small parts distributed across the western suburbs of Sydney. Greystanes has been significantly altered since European colonisation, resulting in the loss of the large majority of this natural habitat. The Gallard Reserve Woodland is an extant, tangible reminder of the former landscape.

== Notable residents ==
Some of the current and former notable residents of Greystanes include:

- Jai Arrow, rugby league player
- Frances Bondad, professional golfer
- Nicholas Brown, actor
- Mark Carroll, rugby league player
- Jason Cayless, rugby league player
- Nathan Cayless, rugby league player
- Frank Cefai, real estate developer
- Lawrence Dimech OAM MOM, journalist
- Fred Downes, politician
- Laura Dundovic, model and actress
- Mitchell Emery, water polo player
- Amanda Farrugia, Australian rules footballer
- Tim Faulkner, TV personality, zookeeper, conservationist, wildlife educator and environmentalist
- Brad Fittler, rugby league player
- Paul Gallen, rugby league player and boxer
- Phil Gould, rugby league player, coach and TV presenter
- Paul Gow, professional golfer (resided and played in Greystanes for all his junior years)
- Greg Hartley, rugby league referee
- Brett Kenny, rugby league player
- Ashley Klein, rugby league referee
- Nelson Lawson, politician
- Ryan Matterson, rugby league player
- Warren Potent, sport shooter
- Ray Price OAM, rugby union and rugby league player
- Michael Regan, politician
- Jason Saab, rugby league player
- Dani Stevens, discus thrower
- Carissa Walford, TV presenter

== Religion ==
Greystanes has a number of Christian churches of various denominations:

- Our Lady Queen of Peace Catholic Church
- Greystanes Uniting Church
- Holroyd New Life Church
- Methodist Church of Fiji

== Commercial areas ==
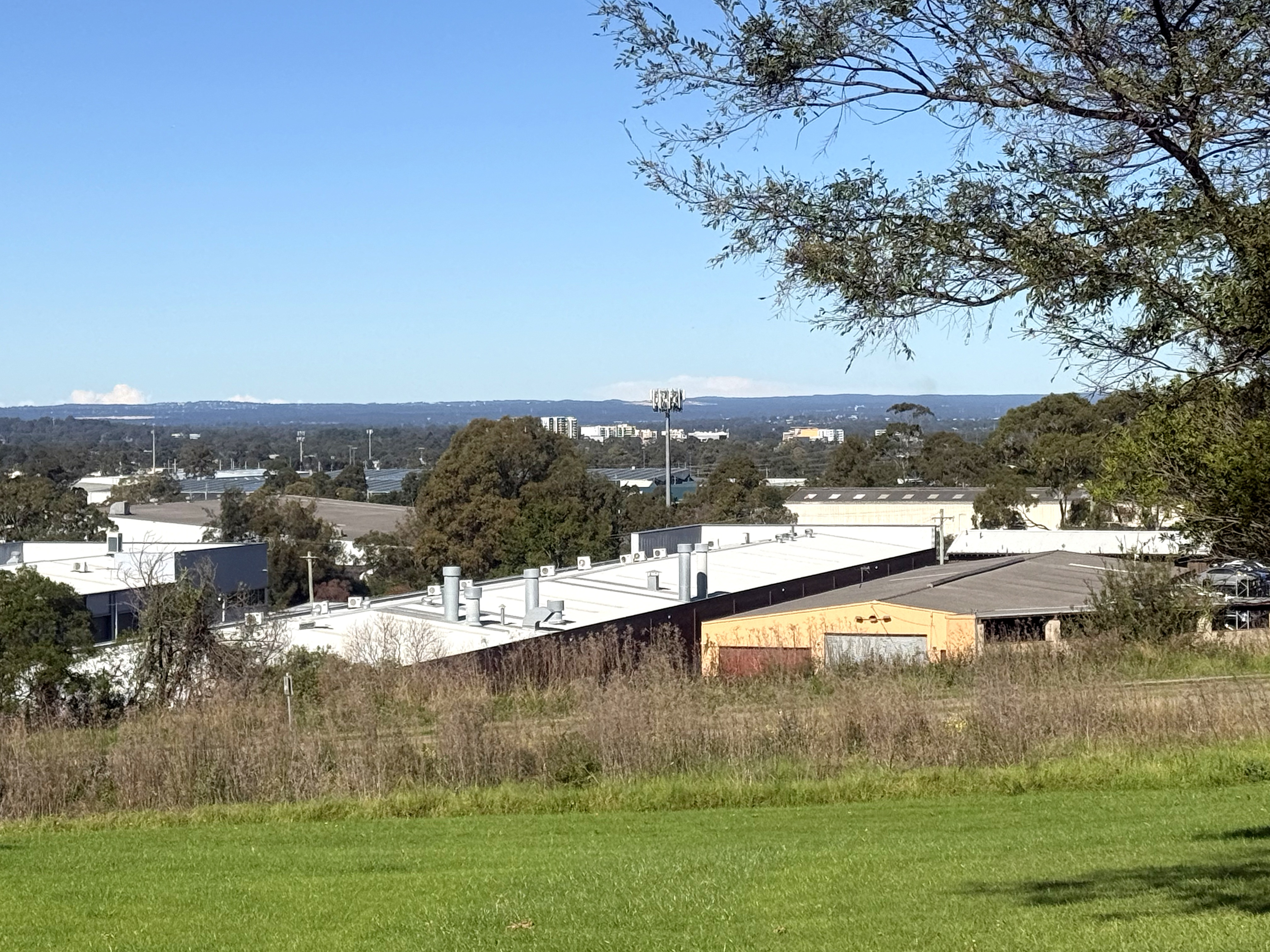
Canal Road Park, with the skyline of Fairfield in the background

Greystanes Shopping Centre opened in 1970 along with the Greystanes Inn (known to locals as the GI).

The Greystanes Inn is famous for its Christmas Eve and Anzac Day (including Two-up) festivities.

Greystanes Shopping Centre is a semi-enclosed, single level shopping centre anchored by Woolworths, along with numerous speciality shops and service providers. Greystanes Shopping Centre was refurbished in 2014.

== Education ==
Greystanes is serviced by a number of educational institutions. The Department of Education schools are:

- Greystanes Public School (known as The Harper Street School, opened in 1902)
- Ringrose Primary School (1962)
- Greystanes High School (1963)
- Holroyd High School (1968) – Houses an Intensive English Centre which provides a specialised program to non-English speaking migrants and refugees.
- Beresford Road Primary School (1969)
- Widemere Public School (1975)

The private Catholic schools are:

- Our Lady Queen of Peace Primary School (1958)
- St Pauls Catholic College (1962) (originally St. Simon Stock High School and later Newman High School).

== Parks and recreation ==
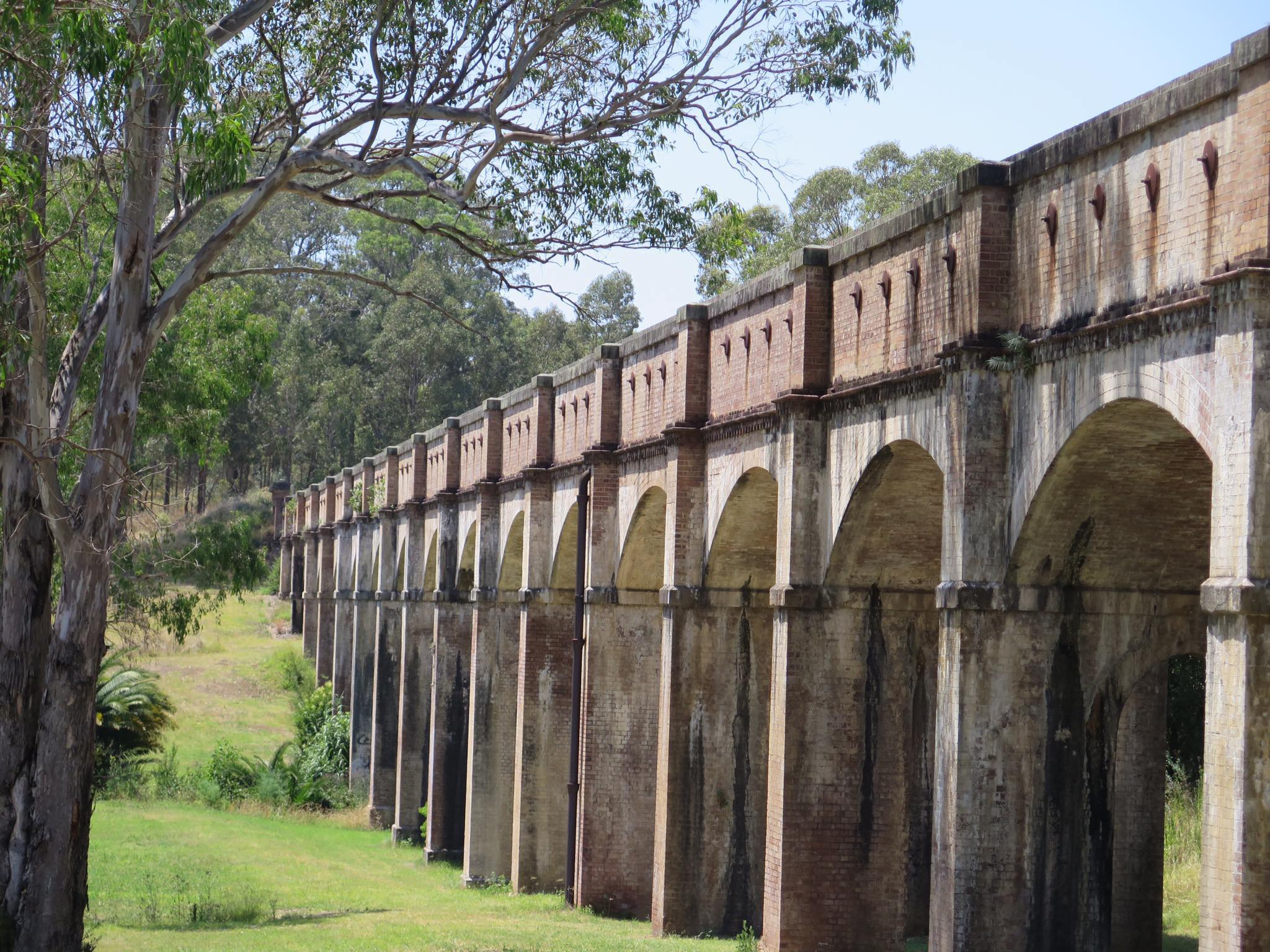
Boothtown Aqueduct off Macquarie Rd

Greystanes contains a large number of parks, ovals, and sporting facilities, as well as the famous Cumberland golf course (officially established in 1938).

The south side of Greystanes features the Lower Prospect Canal Reserve what is simply known by residents as the Canal. This reserve is connected to Grey Box Reserve. Many Small neighbourhood parks are scattered around the suburb. Greystanes Creek, a tributary of Parramatta River, is named after the suburb and features a number of parks on its strip.

One prominent park is the Canal Road Park, which is 70 metres above sea level and thus features a panoramic lookout of southwest Sydney. Originally it was a water canal once used to transport water from the Prospect Reservoir, but has since been decommissioned and converted into a cycle and walkway. Despite this, it is still referred to by its original function. The Canal features the regionally well-known Boothtown Aqueduct (as its original function was) located on Macquarie Rd, Greystanes.

The south-west of Greystanes contains the Gipps Road Sporting Complex and the Rosford Street Reserve, which consist of multiple ovals suitable for sports such as football and cricket. Around the ovals are large, open fields, suitable for other forms of recreation and a small BMX track in Rosford Street Reserve. The Holroyd Rifle Range and Pigeon Club is located on Hyland Road, near the aforementioned sporting complexes and the Hyland Road Youth Centre and Men's Shed.

The southern boundary of Greystanes with Smithfield follows the Widemere Reserve bushland regeneration corridor, which extends from Gipps Road in the west to Percival Road in the east. Immediately south of the corridor, an extensive industrial precinct containing factories, warehouses and other industrial premises forms much of Smithfield's northern edge. The corridor runs broadly parallel to the Lower Prospect Canal Reserve, creating two east-west green corridors across the suburb.

== Demographics ==
According to the 2021 census, there were 23,511 residents of Greystanes. Of these:

- 49.4% were male and 50.6% were female
- The median age was 39 years. Children aged 0–14 years made up 21% of the population and people aged 65 years and over made up 18.9% of the population.
- 62.9% of people were born in Australia. The most common countries of birth were Lebanon 4.5%, India 2.9%, Malta 2.5%, China 1.5% and Philippines 1.3%.
- The most common ancestries were Australian 21%, English 16.4%, Lebanese 15.5%, Maltese 6.2% and Italian 6.1%.
- 55.4% of people only spoke English at home. Other languages spoken at home included Arabic 13%, Maltese 2.3%, Greek 2.1%, Turkish 1.7% and Croatian 1.6%.
- The most common responses for religion were Catholic 44.7%, No Religion 13%, Islam 8.3%, Anglican 7.4%, and Eastern Orthodox 5.8%.

== Governance ==
Greystanes political information at a federal, state and local council level as of 2024.

Level	Federal	State	Local Government Area
Jurisdiction	Australia	NSW	Cumberland City Council
Electoral Boundary	McMahon	Prospect	Greystanes Ward
Representatives	Chris Bowen (Labor)	Hugh McDermott (Labor)	Diane Colman (Labor), Eddy Sarkis (IND), Nadima Kafrouni-Saba (Liberal)

== Transport ==
Greystanes is primarily accessible by road. At the Greystanes M4 Junction several major roads meet including: the Cumberland Highway, the Great Western Highway and the M4 Motorway. The fastest route from the Sydney CBD is via the M4 Western Motorway, exiting at the Cumberland Highway.

Greystanes is serviced by Region 3 Transit Systems bus services with routes linking to Parramatta railway station and Blacktown railway station on the T1 North Shore & Western Line and Merrylands railway station and Liverpool railway station on the T2 Inner West & Leppington Line of the Sydney Trains network.

Bus Number	route	Major Stops/ Roads	Other
800	Blacktown station to Fairfield station		
806	Parramatta station to Liverpool station	Merrylands station via Prairiewood	
809	Merrylands station to Pemulwuy Marketplace	South Wentworthville, Old Prospect Rd, Gozo Rd	
810X	Parramatta station to Merrylands station/ Nijong Rd	T- Way, Gt Western Hwy, Old Prospect Rd, Pemulwuy MarketPlace	Full week operation from 18 Apr 2021.
811X	Parramatta station to Pemulwuy Marketplace	T- Way, Gt Western Hwy, Old Prospect Rd, Bathurst St	Full week operation from 18 Apr 2021.
818	Westmead to Merrylands station	Westmead Hospitals, Wentworthville, Old Prospect Rd, Ringrose Ave	Operates on weekdays
