= Greystanes High School =

Location
- Greystanes, New South Wales; Australia; 33.8124°S 150.9403°E

Information
- Type: Public government high school
- Motto: Success Smiles On Effort
- Established: 1961
- Principal: Grant Sparke
- Enrolment: ~956 (7–12)
- Colours: Green and white
- Website: GHS Website

Greystanes High School is a publicly funded comprehensive co-educational secondary school located in Greystanes, a suburb of Sydney, Australia.

== Houses and colours ==
The school's student population is organised into four houses for the purposes of sporting competitions, mentoring, roll marking and the like:

- Bradman – Blue – named for the cricketer, Sir Don Bradman
- Gilmore – Yellow – named for the writer and activist, Dame Mary Gilmore
- Monash – Green – named for the engineer and citizen soldier, General Sir John Monash
- Parkes – Red – named for the Australian statesman, Sir Henry Parkes
