= Lower Prospect Canal Reserve =

Australian nature reserve

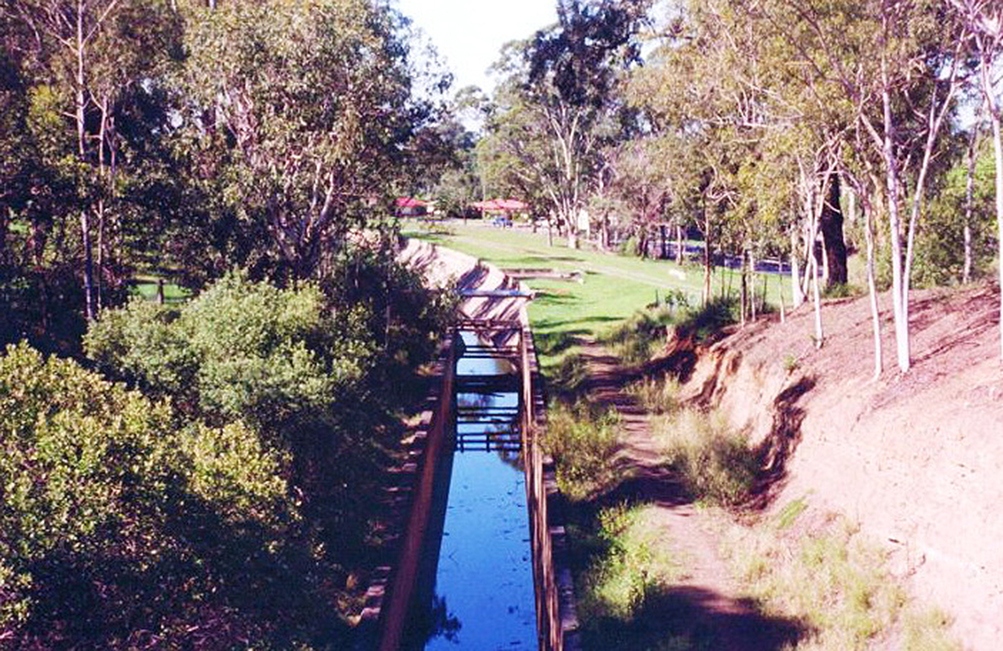
- The canal within the bushland corridor.

- Location within Sydney
- Type: Woodland, urban park, urban forest, nature reserve
- Location: Cumberland Council
- Coordinates: 33°49′55″S 150°56′45″E
- Area: 546 hectares (1,349.20 acres)
- Opened: 1888
- Owner: Cumberland Council
- Status: Open all year

New South Wales Heritage Register
- Official name: Lower Prospect Canal Reserve; Lower Canal; Boothtown Aqueduct; Inverted Syphon; Aqueduct Valve House No 1 & 2 and Culvert; Covered Way; Smithfield Tanks; Sedimentation Channel
- Type: State heritage (built)
- Designated: 30 June 2015
- Reference no.: 1945
- Type: Irrigation Channel/Canal
- Category: Utilities – Water
- Builders: NSW Board of Water Supply and Sewerage; Kinchela and Metcalfe

The Lower Prospect Canal Reserve is a heritage-listed former farm and public water supply canal and now bushy corridor and nature reserve stretching 7.7 kilometres (4.8 mi) through the heart of suburban Sydney, New South Wales, Australia. The lineal corridor stretches from Prospect Reservoir to Sydney Water Pipehead at Albert Street, Guildford with the majority of the reserve located in Greystanes, which is a suburb within the Cumberland Council area.

The Canal Reserve is one of the last remaining remnants of natural Cumberland Plain Woodland in the Sydney basin and contains a number of rare and endangered plant specimens. The land corridor occupied by the canal is recognised by the local government and documented for conservation and protection measures. Formerly a public water supply for western Sydney, the Lower Prospect Canal was eventually unneeded in May 1995 when Sydney Water authorized an underground pipeline for $54m.

The whole scheme relied on gravity and therefore demanded unerring accuracy during construction. The Lower Prospect Canal falls approximately 77 centimetres (30 in) over its 7.7 kilometre length. The scheme, including the Lower Prospect Canal, was designed by Edward Orpen Moriarty and built from 1880 to 1888 by the NSW Board of Water Supply and Sewerage; Kinchela and Metcalfe. It is also known as Lower Canal, Boothtown Aqueduct, Inverted Syphon, Aqueduct Valve House No 1 & 2 and Culvert, Covered Way, Smithfield Tanks and Sedimentation Channel. The property is Crown land and is administered by the Department of Industry, Skills and Regional Infrastructure Development, a department of the Government of New South Wales. It was added to the New South Wales State Heritage Register on 30 June 2015.

== History ==
In the 1860s following droughts and population expansion, the need for a larger and more reliable water source was required for Sydney. A Special Commission, in 1869, recommended the construction of the Upper Nepean Scheme. The proposal was approved in 1877 and work commenced in 1880. The canal was originally a dry-stone masonry construction in 1888. From 1902–12 it was largely reconstructed and relined to decrease outflow and increase capacity and stability. A part of the canal known as the Covered Way, located at the base of Prospect Hill near Hyland Road Greystanes, collapsed in 1904 and was reconstructed in 1905. The Covered Way is a basined component of the canal that protected the water supply from contamination that may have entered the canal due to the steepness and proximity of Prospect Hill.

By the late 1980s, the Lower Canal was incapable of keeping up with the growing need for water from Sydney's large population. At its peak capacity, following alterations, it could still carry only 100 million gallons per day. In addition to that, increasing standards of water quality and security of supply were rising up against the urban development that was encroaching on the setting of the open water Lower Canal.

The Upper Nepean Scheme saw water from the Upper Nepean, Avon, Cordeaux and Cataract Rivers channelled via tunnel, pipes and open canal to Prospect Reservoir. From Prospect Reservoir the water supply moved through an open canal known as the Lower Prospect Canal along the corridor now known as the Lower Prospect Canal Reserve. That use came to an end in May 1995, when the Lower Canal was drained and replaced by an underground pipeline from Prospect Reservoir to Pipehead, thus leaving the community with the chance to gain a spectacular parcel of land for recreational purposes. The pipeline increased the dependability, water quality and amount of water flow from Prospect to Pipehead.

The Lower Canal was made into a public reserve in 1998 which follows the course of the former canal. The reserve has survived the intense urban development that surrounds it, due to its use, for over 100 years, as part of the water supply system for Sydney. August 2003 saw the reserve opened to the community with a cycleway–walkway (Western Sydney Parklands-Canal Reserve cycleway) running its full length and connecting with other cycleways that extend across a great part of the Sydney metropolitan area.

== Geography ==
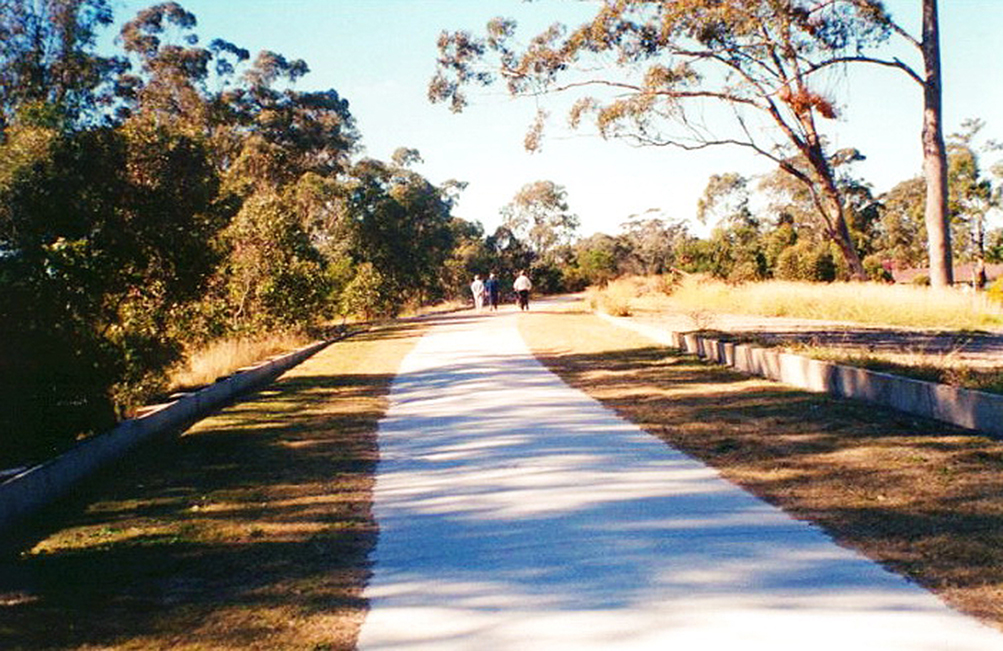
The pedestrian cycleway.

Connected to Marrong Reserve to the west, the reserve is just over 6.6 km long, starting from Reconciliation Road, Pemulwuy, passing through the suburbs of Greystanes, Smithfield, Merrylands and Woodpark, to its endpoint at Pipehead, Guildford. The Lower Canal snakes its way on the edge of a natural ridge from the western part slowly falling to an artificial constructed embankment at the eastern end.

The elevation of the western end of the canal is approximately 60-70m above sea level, falling to 40m. Three roads with bridges transverse over the Lower Canal: Gipps Road, Cumberland Highway and Sherwood Road. Medium-density housing borders the reserve to the north and south with light industry located to the south near Smithfield. The canal is now surrounded on both sides by managed nature reserves.

Canal Road Park, located on the western outskirts of Greystanes, near Merrylands West, is on an elevated ridge, which provides panoramic views of southwestern Sydney. It also features a children's playground, BBQ area and picnic shelters.

== Structure ==
The canal was an open gravity flow with a gradient of approximately 10 centimetres (3.9 in) per km over its length. The upper width varied between 5.8 and 7.25 metres (19.0 and 23.8 ft) and its depth between 2.4 and 3m. About one kilometre (zero point six two miles) east of the start of the canal, at Prospect Reservoir, the Lower Canal was diverted underground for 288 metres (945 ft). This was designed so to protect the canal water from contamination by the slope of Prospect Hill through which it was cut.

The valve house at the head of the canal at Prospect Reservoir have inlet pipes, which allowed water to pass from the reservoir into the canal to start its journey to Pipehead. The inlet pipe flow was controlled by a set of valves housed within the valve house adjacent to the receiving basin. Inlet pipes in the base of the receiving basin allowed water to pass from the reservoir into the canal to start its journey to Pipehead. The inlet pipe flow was controlled by a set of valves housed within the valve house adjacent to the receiving basin. At the farthest point of the canal, prior to it entering Pipehead, there are two sedimentation chambers and a central bypass which were used to trap sediment from the water before it entered the Pipehead pumphouse. On the south side of the canal, adjacent to Percival Road, there are two in-ground tanks, the first built in 1895, that were used to supply Smithfield with water.

Today, these tanks have been unheeded and are hard to situate due to overgrowth. The upper 150 millimetres (5.9 in) of canal wall was left open so visitors can observe the canal's path and to stipulate a clear view between the bushland and the retained sod that is used between the concrete cycleway and the canal walls.

A detention basin (Widemere Detention Basin), which stores stormwater runoffs, exists just north of Wetherill Park between Prospect Highway and Hyland Road in Greystanes. If the rainwater is less than the basin's capacity, there will be no discharge, but if the waters exceed they will overflow into Prospect Creek. The water levels in the basin is supervised and modified to guarantee capacity for a 90th percentile 5 day rainfall event. Though the water in the detention basin is generally recycled.

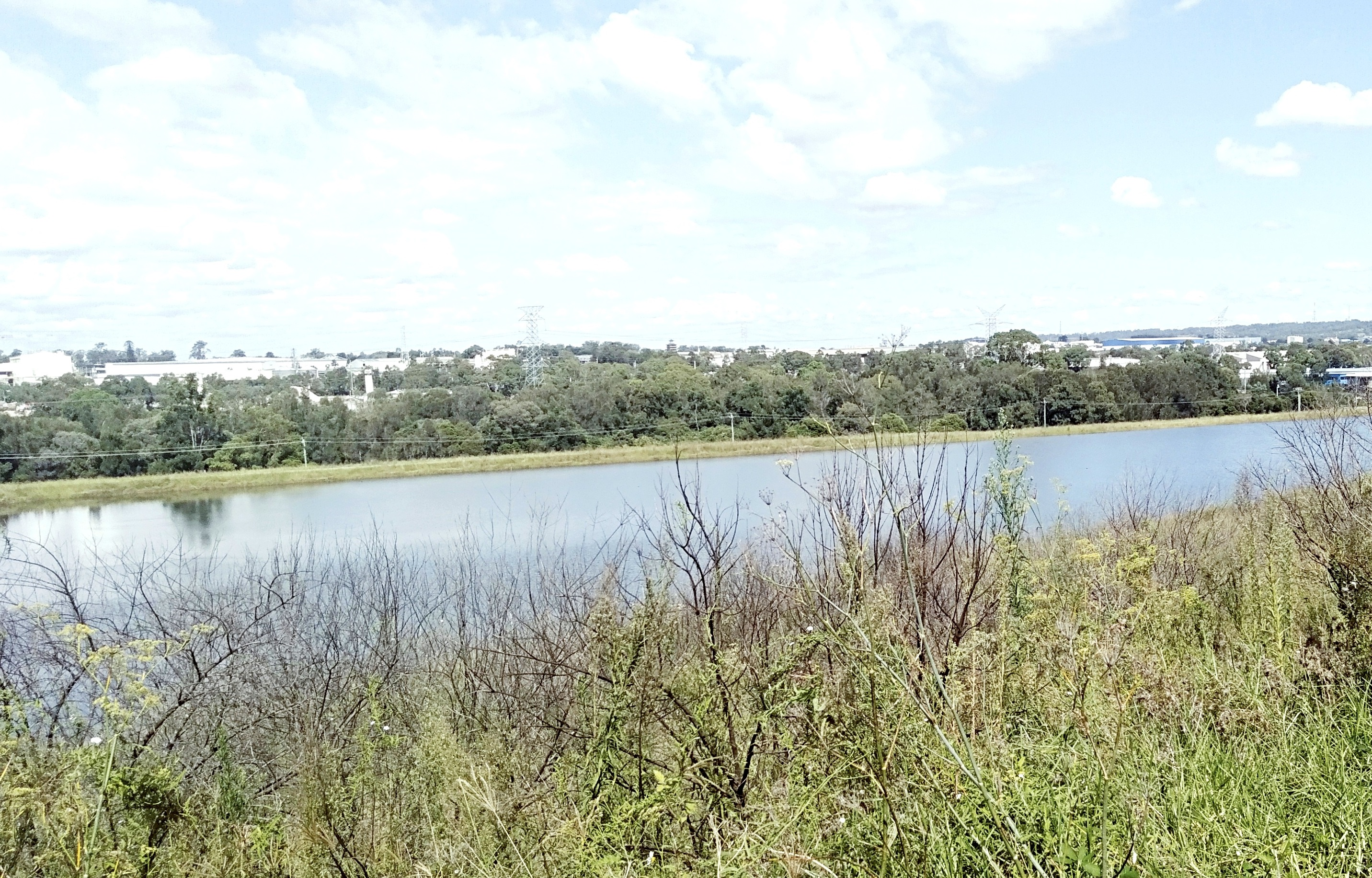
Widemere Detention Basin after the March 2021 Australian floods.

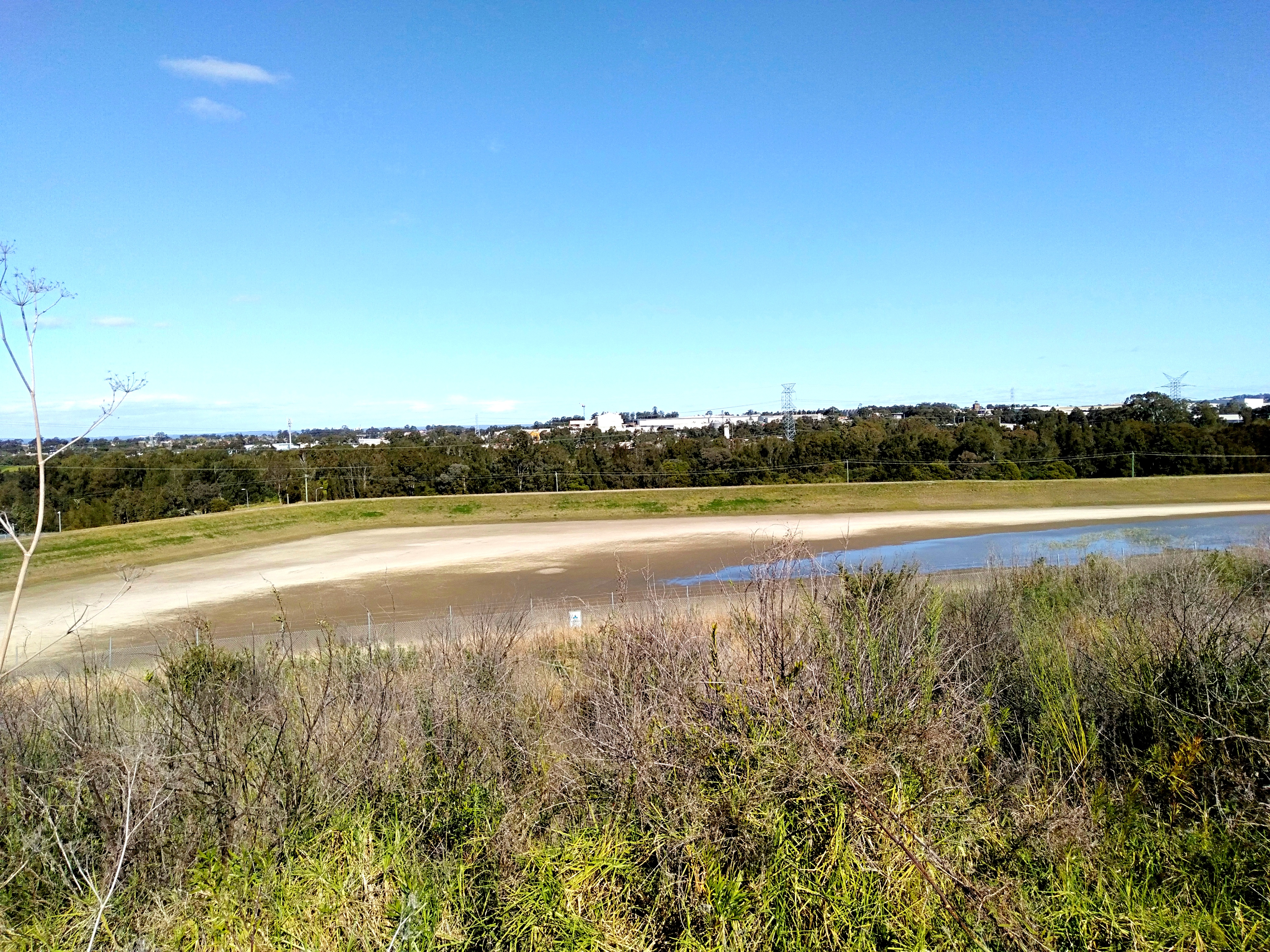
The detention basin after a dry period.

=== Modifications and dates ===
The following modifications were made to the structure:

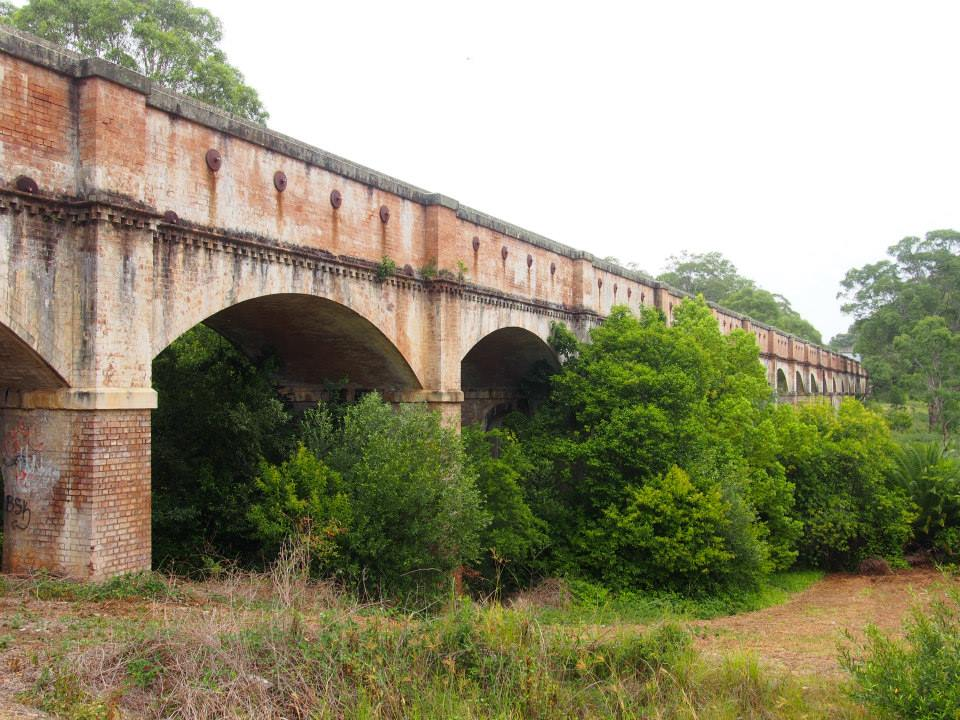
The Boothtown Aqueduct, which was used to transport water through the canal from 1888 to 1907.

- 1895 – Smithfield Tanks (reservoir) constructed for water supply for Smithfield
- 1902–12 – Relining of the canal with Monier plates or concrete to increase the capacity of the Lower Canal by around 75%; walls of Smithfield Tank raised
- 1903 – Sedimentation Chambers constructed west of Pipehead
- 1905 – Rebuilding of the Covered Way in concrete following its collapse
- 1907 – Boothtown Aqueduct ceases operation. Inverted Syphon constructed alongside Boothtown Aqueduct
- 1911 – Construction of Gipps Road Bridge over Lower Canal
- 1995 – Lower Canal replaced by an underground pipeline from Prospect Reservoir to Pipehead, Lower Canal decommissioned and dewatered
- 2001 – Work commenced on the Lower Prospect Canal Reserve to create a combined pedestrian/cycleway commencing at Prospect Reservoir and terminating at Pipehead Guildford. Infilling involved protection of the canal walls; installation of drainage measures and infilling with a mix of concrete aggregate and packed soil layers. An aggregate or plain pathway was constructed. The heritage significance of the canal was a consideration in this process and the infilling is reversible
- 2003 – Lower Prospect Canal Reserve and pedestrian/cycleway officially opened. Reserve gazetted as Crown Land in 2004 with Holroyd City Council as trustees
- 2008 – A 100-metre (330 ft) section of the infilled Lower Canal on the western boundary of the Prospect Reservoir SHR listing was removed in 2008 for the construction of Reconciliation Road. The Lower Prospect Canal Reserve now commences at Reconciliation Road

== Controversy ==
At the end of April 2008, the final section of the canal leading to the Prospect Reservoir was sectioned off and destroyed as Boral, under direction of the RTA, commenced work on extending Reconciliation Drive from the Prospect industrial zone through to Wetherill Park. Work was scheduled to be completed by mid October 2008 but was still continuing as of early 2013.

This work has proved controversial with the community as a section of the historic canal has been destroyed and a bridge originally promised to traverse the new highway and transitway will now not be built. A previous heritage listed feature of the old Widemere Quarry railway line had been preserved by building the main access road around the old bridge supports. The community is now waging a battle with the NSW State Government to have this decision reversed.

== Heritage listing ==
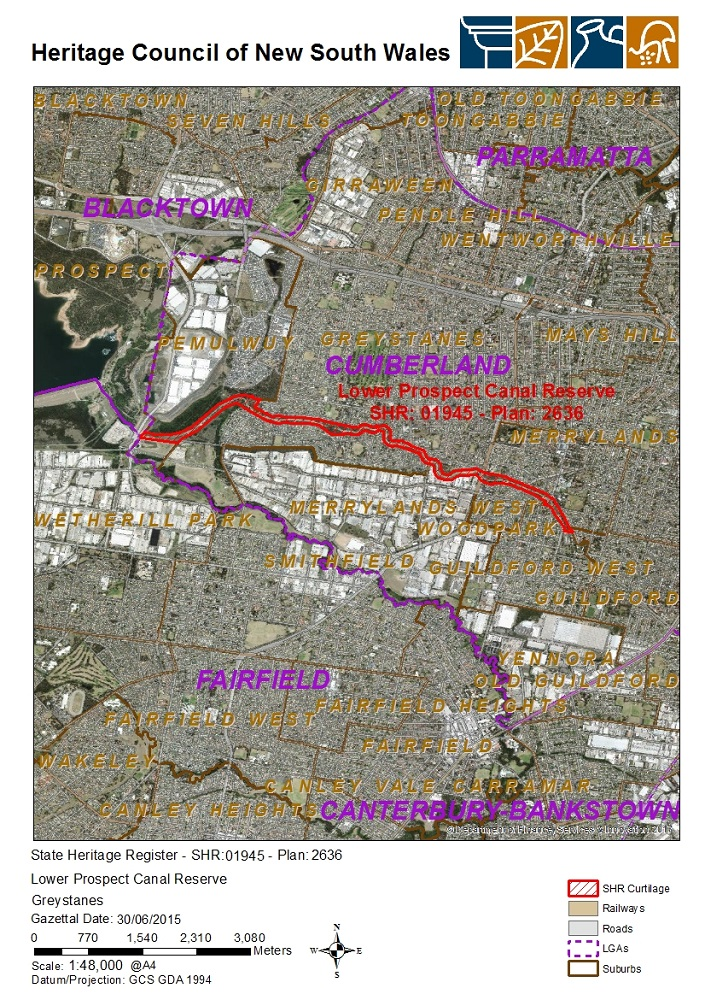
Map showing the linear corridor of the Lower Prospect Canal Reserve in Western Sydney

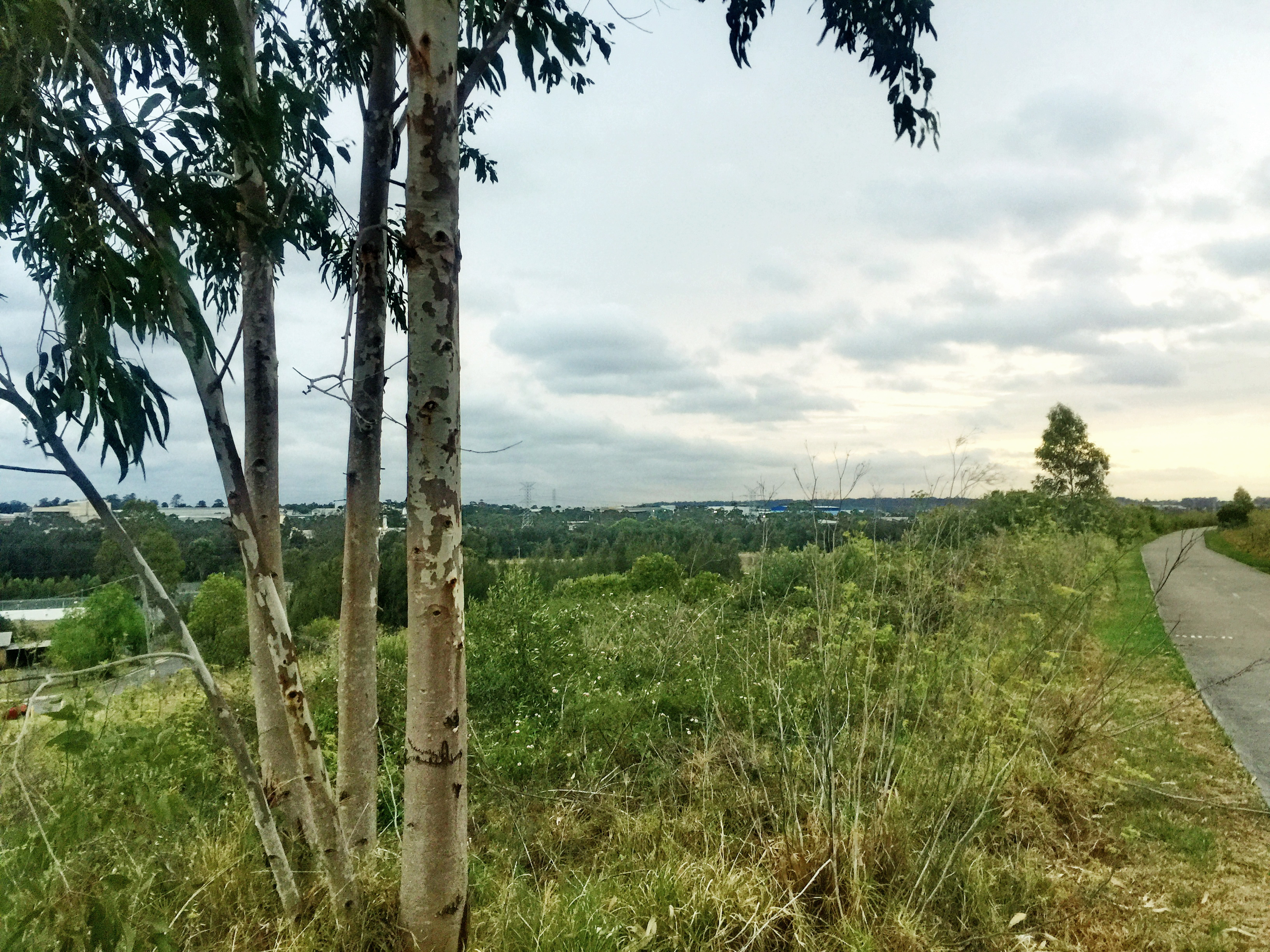
A walking and cycling track in Pemulwuy.

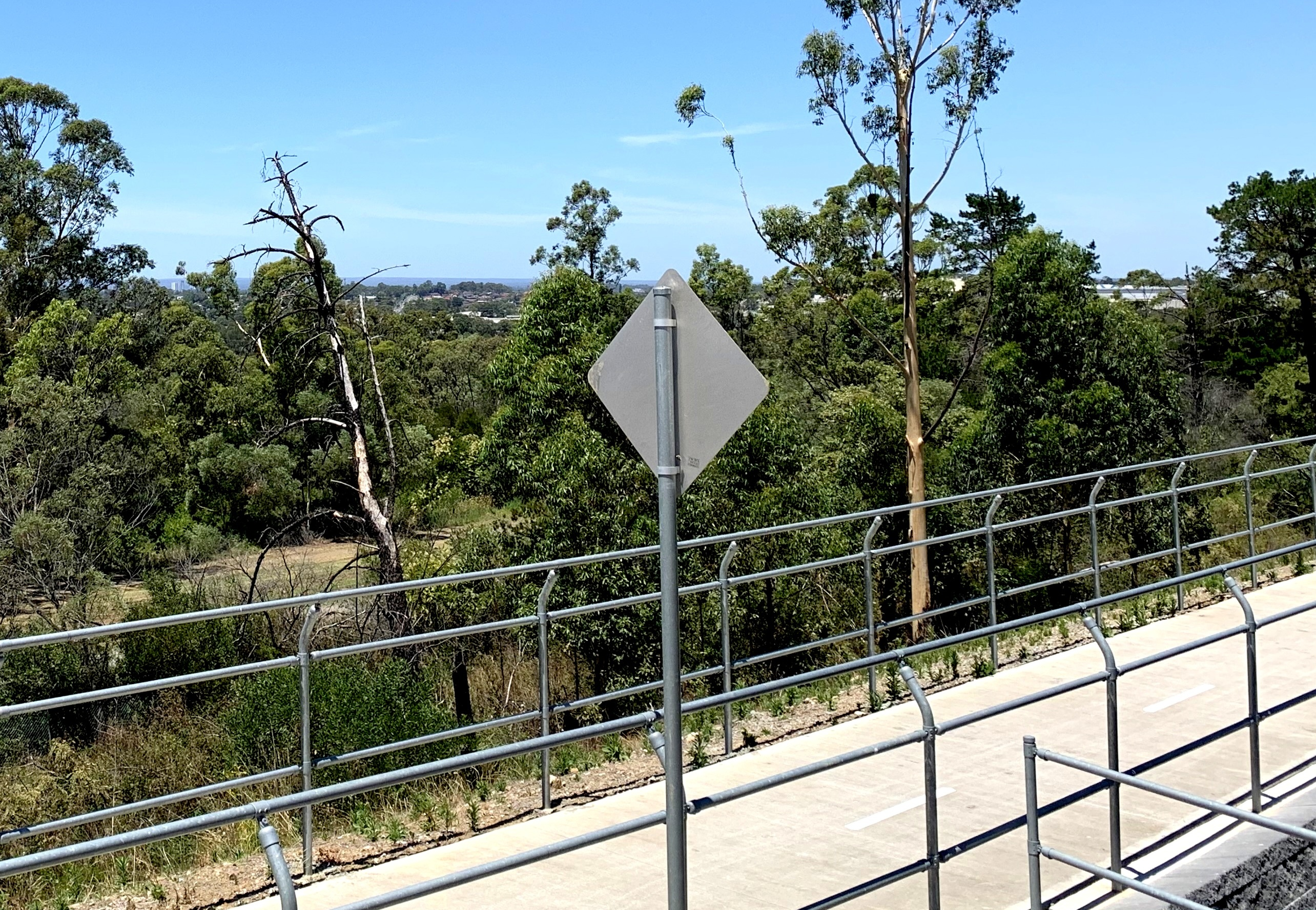
The cycling track leading into the reserve from Driftway Drive, Pemulwuy

The reserve was listed on the New South Wales State Heritage Register as a site of State significance on 18 November 1999 with the following citation:

The Lower Prospect Canal Reserve is of state significance for the former Lower Canal contained within the reserve and the natural heritage values of the reserve. The Lower Canal, and its associated infrastructure, is state significant as a key component of the Upper Nepean Scheme. This scheme was the outcome of the first major engineering investigation in NSW into the provision of an adequate and reliable water supply to meet the needs of a rapidly growing Sydney.

The Upper Nepean Scheme was Sydney's fourth water supply, and its first reliable, and most enduring, engineered water supply. It marked a major engineering advance from locally sourced to remotely harvested water, obtained from rivers in upland catchment areas, that was stored in dams and transported by weirs, open channels, tunnels and pipelines to its final destination. The Upper Nepean Scheme was one of the largest engineering and public infrastructure works carried out in Australia up to 1888. It was an important determinant of Sydney's growth potential. No other similar water supply canals of the form and scale of those associated with the Upper Nepean Scheme have ever been built in NSW. The scheme is a system that has lent itself to progressive development to meet Sydney's increasing water supply needs. It continues to function for the purpose for which it was designed and constructed.

The Lower Canal functioned as a key element of the Upper Nepean Scheme for over 100 years. Apart from extensive upgrades in its first decades, the Lower Canal changed little in its basic principles during this period. The Lower Canal is an excellent example of the techniques of 19th century hydraulic engineering, particularly the use of gravity directed water flow to supply a large area of Sydney with water. The Lower Canal has research potential for its detailed and varied evidence of engineering construction techniques, both the original masonry and the later reinforced concrete upgrade works. The Lower Canal is state significant for its reuse which involves reversible infilling along its entire length; has retained its capacity to demonstrate its original water supply function, and assists in demonstrating the Upper Nepean System as an entity.

As at 18 November 2014, the Lower Prospect Canal Reserve is of state significance for the former Lower Canal contained within the reserve and the natural heritage values of the reserve. The Lower Canal, and its associated infrastructure, is state significant as a key component of the Upper Nepean Scheme. This scheme was the outcome of the first major engineering investigation in NSW into the provision of an adequate and reliable water supply to meet the needs of a rapidly growing Sydney. The Upper Nepean Scheme was Sydney's fourth water supply, and its first reliable, and most enduring, engineered water supply. It marked a major engineering advance from locally sourced to remotely harvested water, obtained from rivers in upland catchment areas, that was stored in dams and transported by weirs, open channels, tunnels and pipelines to its final destination. The Upper Nepean Scheme was one of the largest engineering and public infrastructure works carried out in Australia up to 1888. It was an important determinant of Sydney's growth potential. No other similar water supply canals of the form and scale of those associated with the Upper Nepean Scheme have ever been built in NSW. The scheme is a system that has lent itself to progressive development to meet Sydney's increasing water supply needs. It continues to function for the purpose for which it was designed and constructed. The Lower Canal functioned as a key element of the Upper Nepean Scheme for over 100 years. Apart from extensive upgrades in its first decades, the Lower Canal changed little in its basic principles during this period. The Lower Canal is an excellent example of the techniques of 19th century hydraulic engineering, particularly the use of gravity directed water flow to supply a large area of Sydney with water. The Lower Canal has research potential for its detailed and varied evidence of engineering construction techniques, both the original masonry and the later reinforced concrete upgrade works. The Lower Canal is state significant for its reuse which involves reversible infilling along its entire length; has retained its capacity to demonstrate its original water supply function, and assists in demonstrating the Upper Nepean System as an entity. Large sections of the Lower Prospect Canal Reserve are identified within the biodiversity map of Holroyd Local Environmental Plan 2013 as containing "Remnant Native Vegetation", particularly shale plains woodland. Cumberland Plain Woodland is identified as a critically endangered species under both the Environment Protection and Biodiversity Conservation Act 1999 (Cwlth) and the Threatened Species Conservation Act 1995 (NSW).

Lower Prospect Canal Reserve was listed on the New South Wales State Heritage Register on 30 June 2015 having satisfied the following criteria.

The place is important in demonstrating the course, or pattern, of cultural or natural history in New South Wales.

The Lower Canal is state significant as a key component of the Upper Nepean Scheme. This scheme was the outcome of the first major engineering investigation in NSW into the provision of an adequate and reliable water supply to meet the needs of a rapidly growing Sydney. The Upper Nepean Scheme was Sydney's fourth water supply, and its first reliable, and most enduring, engineered water supply. It marked a major engineering advance from locally sourced to remotely harvested water, obtained from rivers in upland catchment areas, that was stored in dams and transported by weirs, open channels, tunnels and pipelines to its final destination. The Upper Nepean Scheme was one of the largest engineering and public infrastructure works carried out in Australia up to 1888. It was an important determinant of Sydney's growth potential. No other similar water supply canals of the form and scale of those associated with the Upper Nepean Scheme have ever been built in NSW. The closest comparison to the Upper Nepean Scheme would be Melbourne's Yan Yean Water Supply Scheme which is fundamentally similar in concept and operation, but predates the Upper Nepean Scheme and is not as ambitious in scale. The scheme is a system that has lent itself to progressive development to meet Sydney's increasing water supply needs. It continues to function for the purpose for which it was designed and constructed.

The Lower Canal functioned as a key element of the Upper Nepean Scheme for over 100 years. Apart from extensive upgrades in its first decades, Lower Canal changed little in its basic principles during this period. The Lower Canal is state significant for its reuse, through reversible infilling along its entire length, that has retained the legibility in the landscape of its original water supply function which is capable of further enhancement through interpretation. Large sections of the Lower Prospect Canal Reserve are identified within the biodiversity map of Holroyd Local Environmental Plan (LEP) 2013 as containing "Remnant Native Vegetation". The biodiversity map was created using data from the NSW National Parks & Wildlife Service mapping of "Vegetation of the Cumberland Plain". This map identifies Cumberland Plain Woodland, particularly shale plains woodland, as being located within the Lower Prospect Canal Reserve. Cumberland Plain Woodland is identified as a critically endangered species under both the Environment Protection and Biodiversity Conservation Act 1999 and the Threatened Species Conservation Act 1995. The species was extensive across the Cumberland Plain (Western Sydney), however only a small percentage of the original extent remains intact and remnants are spread across the Cumberland Plain. Holroyd LEP 2013, along with the EPBC Act 1999 and TSC Act 1995 are all applicable to the conservation of the remnant vegetation of the Lower Prospect Canal Reserve.

The place has a strong or special association with a person, or group of persons, of importance of cultural or natural history of New South Wales's history.

The Lower Canal is of state significance for its association with the NSW Public Works Department and Sydney Water and its antecedents. The NSW Board of Water Supply and Sewerage was constituted to be the managing authority of the Upper Nepean Scheme and was responsible for the design and construction of the Lower Canal. The Lower Canal is of state significance for its association with Edward Orpen Moriarty, Engineer in Chief for Harbours and River Navigation, NSW Department of Public Works as the designer and overseer of the Upper Nepean Scheme. Moriarty is a state significant person in the provision of water supply in NSW. He had previously controlled the building of water supply schemes for Bathurst, Wollongong, Albury, Wagga Wagga and Hunter Valley towns and served as a Commissioner on the 1867 Royal Commission into Sydney's water supply.

The place is important in demonstrating aesthetic characteristics and/or a high degree of creative or technical achievement in New South Wales.

The Lower Canal has state significance for its technical values. It has the capacity to demonstrate techniques of canal building (often at extremely small grades); engineering practices (especially in the period 1888–1912) and land surveying, all largely within an era of horse and manpower. It is an excellent example of the techniques of 19th century hydraulic engineering, particularly the use of gravity directed water flow to supply a large area of Sydney with water. Hydraulic canal building largely ceased world-wide in the 20th century, in favour of pressure pipeline technologies. It is one of the earliest examples in NSW of the large-scale application of precast reinforced concrete construction.

The Lower Canal contains a wide range of individual features including an infilled open canal, an aqueduct, an inverted syphon, reservoirs, bridges, sedimentation chambers, pre-cast reinforced concrete panels; culverts, flumes, scour valves and other elements which individually and collectively demonstrate the technologies and engineering approaches in use in the late 19th and early 20th centuries in NSW. All infrastructure associated with the Lower Canal has been identified and assessed in the Heritage Study of the Upper Canal, Prospect Reservoir & Lower Canal (Upper Nepean Scheme) 1992. This study found a majority of components were of potential state significance. The Lower Canal is state significant for its landmark qualities and reuse (through reversible infilling along its entire length) that retains its capacity to demonstrate its original water supply function. Retention of the Lower Canal's concrete edges along its entire length, together with large sections of only partially filled canal and the associated canal infrastructure, has enabled retention of the Lower Canal's capacity to demonstrate its original water supply function, and its part in the Upper Nepean System as an entity.

The place has a strong or special association with a particular community or cultural group in New South Wales for social, cultural or spiritual reasons.

The item is not considered to be of state significance under this criterion.

The place has potential to yield information that will contribute to an understanding of the cultural or natural history of New South Wales.

The Lower Canal has research potential at state level for the detailed and varied evidence of its various engineering construction techniques. These include its original masonry construction retained beneath its concrete lining upgrade; some of the earliest large-scale applications of pre-cast reinforced concrete construction, and late 19th century hydraulic construction techniques typical of state of the art technology of the time. Retention of the associated structures (Sedimentation Chambers, Smithfield Tank, Inverted Syphon and Covered Way) through reversible infilling provides research potential for further investigation of the construction techniques of these structures.

The place possesses uncommon, rare or endangered aspects of the cultural or natural history of New South Wales.

The Lower Canal has state significance as a key component of a rare and extensive water supply system in NSW. It was one of only two such open water supply canals in Australia; the other being the Upper Canal within the same Upper Nepean Scheme. As the only component of that scheme that is currently decommissioned in its entirety, coupled with its urban location and public accessibility, the Lower Canal has a rare interpretative capacity for its role as an element in the overall Upper Nepean Scheme.

The place is important in demonstrating the principal characteristics of a class of cultural or natural places/environments in New South Wales.

The Lower Canal has state significance for its representative values of the principal characteristics of an extensive, engineered and enduring urban water supply system with the capacity for modification over time.

== See also ==
- Prospect Hill
- Upper Nepean Scheme
- Grey Box Reserve
- Gipps Road and Hyland Road Regional Parklands
