= Boothtown Aqueduct =

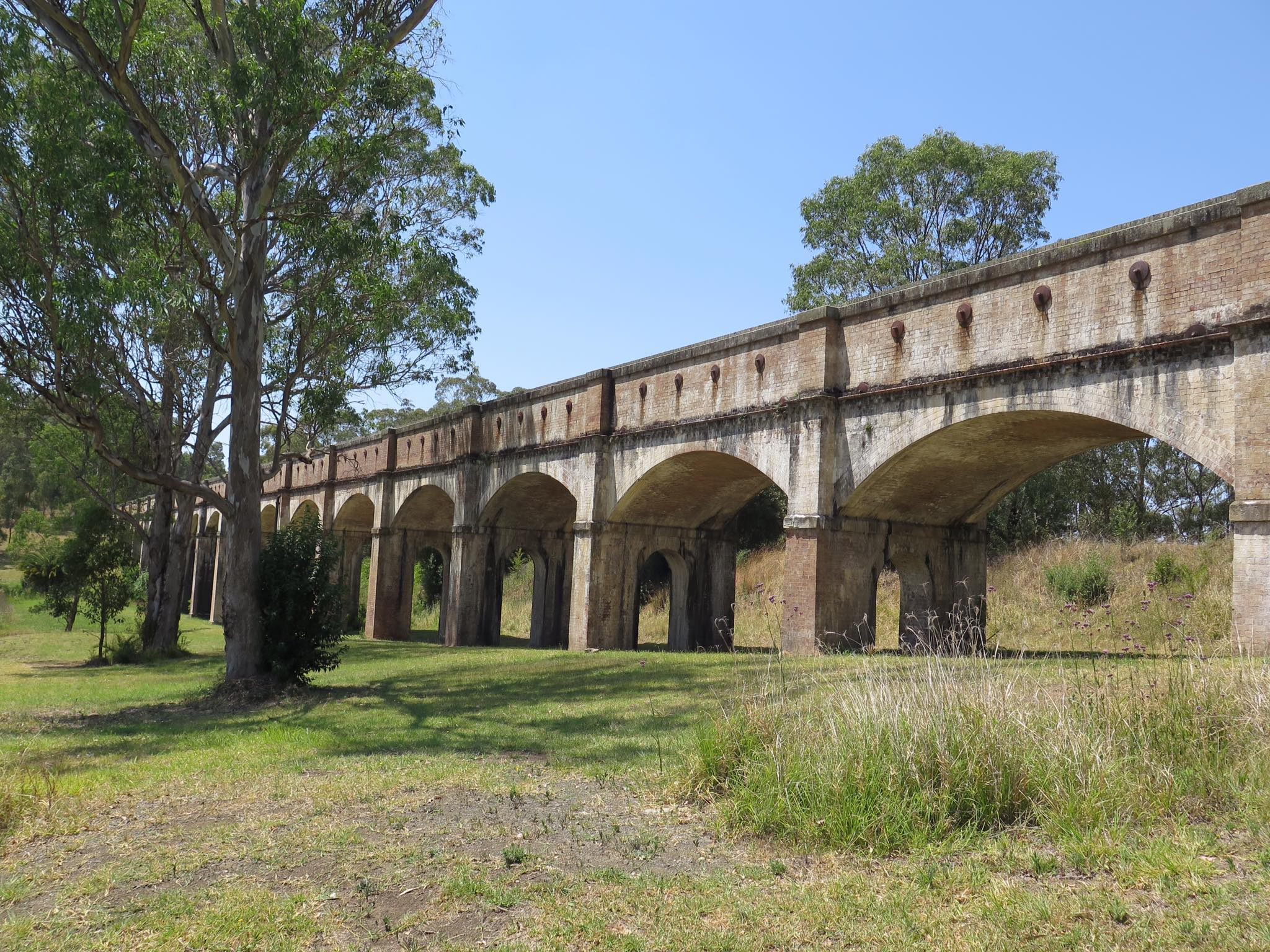
- Coordinates: 33°49′51″S 150°56′18″E

Characteristics
- Total length: c. 225 m (738 ft)
- No. of spans: 22
- Capacity: 423 ML (14.9×10^{6} cu ft) daily

History
- Construction start: January 1886
- Opened: 1888
- Closed: 1907

Location
- Interactive map of Boothtown Aqueduct

The Boothtown Aqueduct is a heritage-listed 19th-century, Victorian Romanesque style water bridge in Greystanes, Sydney, New South Wales, Australia. Established in 1888, the aqueduct was built to cross a valley to carry water from Prospect Reservoir to residents of Greater Western Sydney.

Part of the Lower Prospect Canal Reserve, the aqueduct was the longest continuous concrete work of its kind in Australia in the late 19th century and early 20th century. It was listed in November 1991 in the New South Wales Heritage Database.

The aqueduct was constructed as a part of the Upper Nepean Scheme to convey water from the new Prospect reservoir to the new Potts Hill reservoir.

== History ==
In 1892, after the parapet walls of the aqueduct fell into the creek below it, the walls were reconstructed and restrengthened with a concrete lining and tie rods.

Due to its failings to have its capacity inflated, in 1907 the aqueduct was bypassed with a 3 metre wide, reinforced concrete syphon. Built on the southern side, it allowed the water supply to cross the valley using gravity to push the water up into the canal on the other side.

The Lower Canal and syphon were superseded after a pipeline was established in the 1990s. The aqueduct was subsequently subject to demolition in the 1990s, but due to objections by the local community, the aqueduct and surrounding reserve area were saved and finally included as part of the Western Sydney Cycle Network. The NSW State Government allocated $100,000 in funding and a cycleway was constructed from 2001 to 2003.

== Design ==
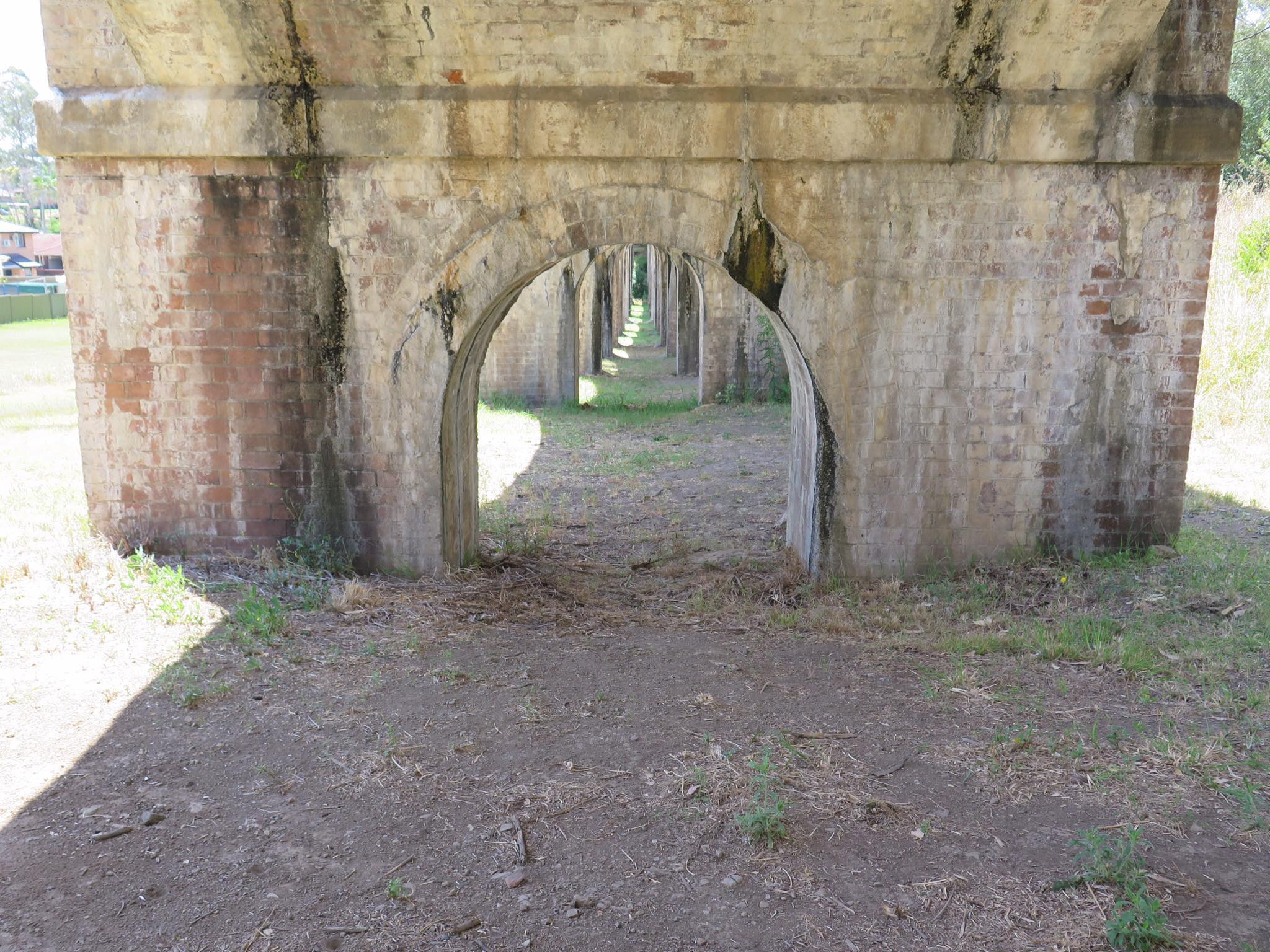
The bridge's fortified concrete legs.

The bridge is made up of 22 arches made of brick, each of 10.16 m (33 ft 4 in) span with a 9.1 m (30 ft) clear span of brick with sandstone springers and was named after John Booth. The aqueduct has a look of an architectural puzzle, expanding and decreasing in size, with the arches aligning differently with each change of aspect. Today, the concrete legs have weathered look, stained by rain and weather. Some vandalism is present on the bridge's arches.

The towers are made of rendered brick, embellished with cement-furnished castellation and doorways that are lancet-arched. The aqueduct was blocked with concrete plugs to divert water into the tube and into a large new concrete pipe. The tube inlets were built as ornate fortified towers with steel trash racks and sluice gates to control the water flow. Fairly decorative features are integrated into the brickwork, such as dentilation, pilasters to each arch and string courses of round cast bricks. The side walls are secured by tie rods.

Described as having "Roman architecture", the aqueduct was one of the first of its kind to use green technology, as it featured the power of gravity to transport water, before failing rather early after its construction and was finally bypassed altogether, becoming a white elephant (despite being a striking landmark in the landscape when the encompassing area consisted of small farmlands and bush).

== Access ==
Boothtown Aqueduct is located on Macquarie Road within a stretch of bushy parks in the suburb of Greystanes. It is surrounded and obscured by residential houses which were built in the 1960s. The aqueduct can also be accessed from Gipps Road to the west, with a number of Transit Systems bus stops close to the bridge on both roads. A pedestrian cycleway passes along the top of the aqueduct as it crosses Boothtown Gully, and west to Prospect Reservoir. Cycleways and walking tracks meander through the western suburbs, with connections across much of the Sydney metropolitan area.

== Gallery ==
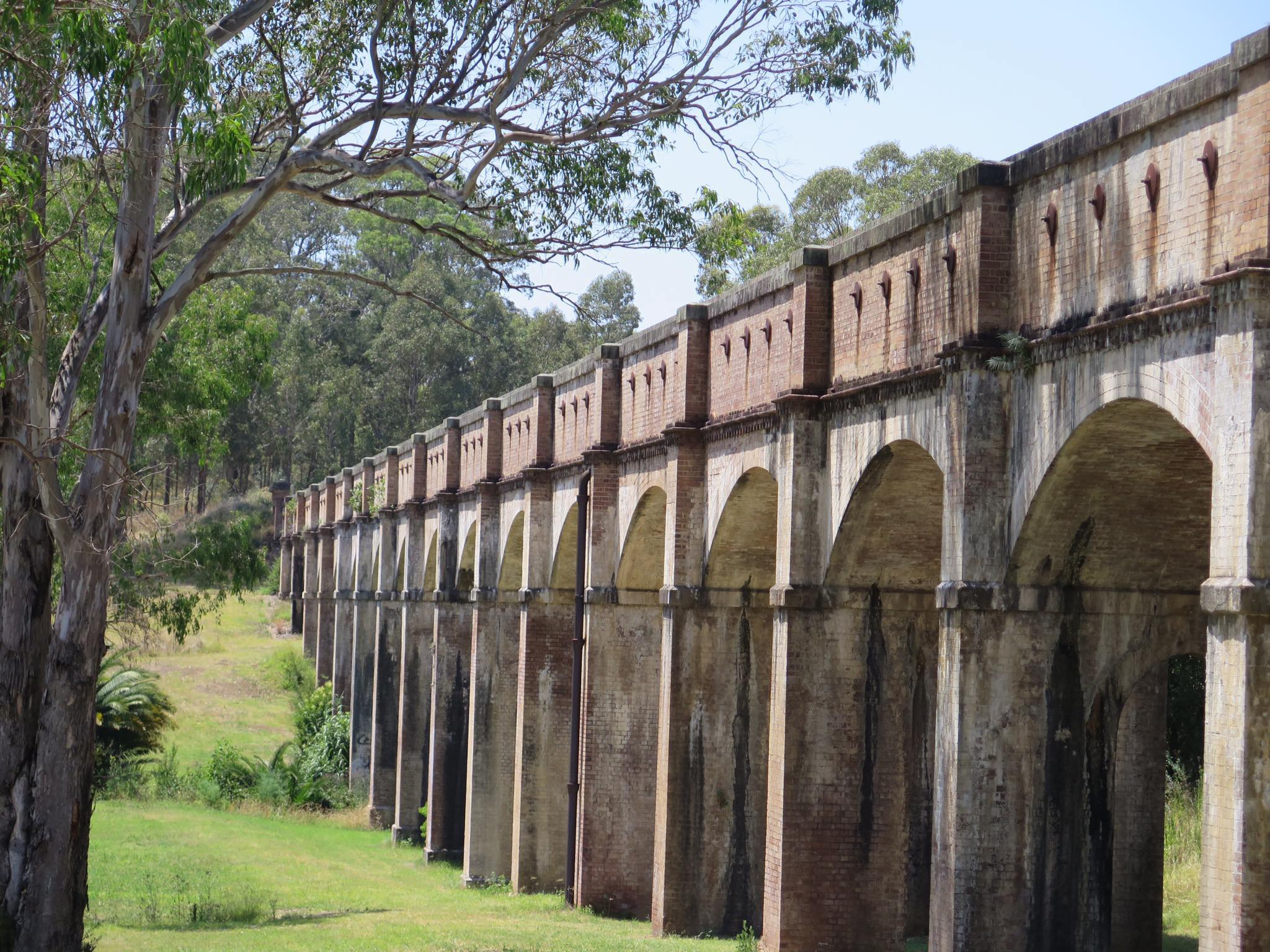
Panoramic view

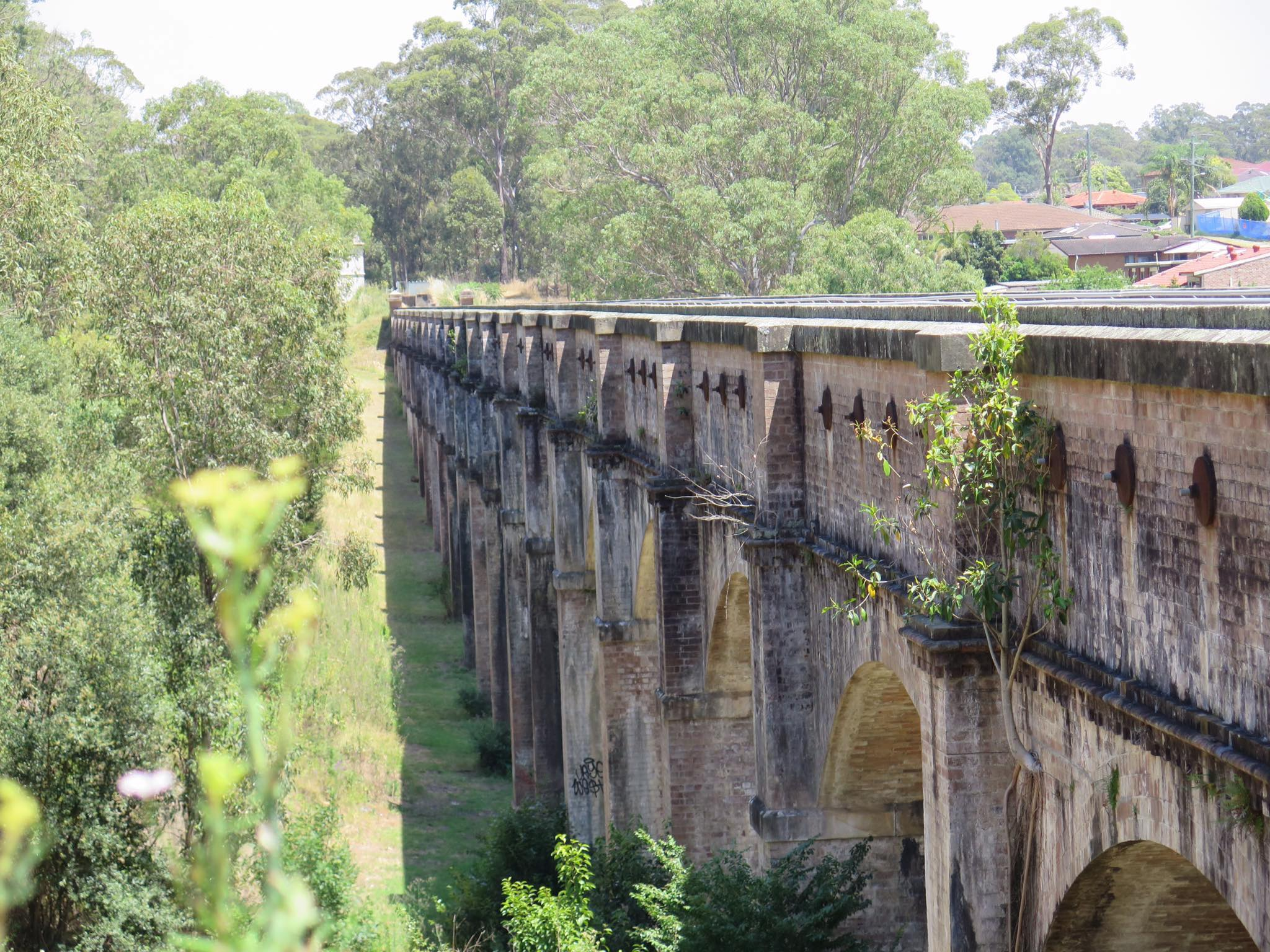
The aqueduct with suburban view in background

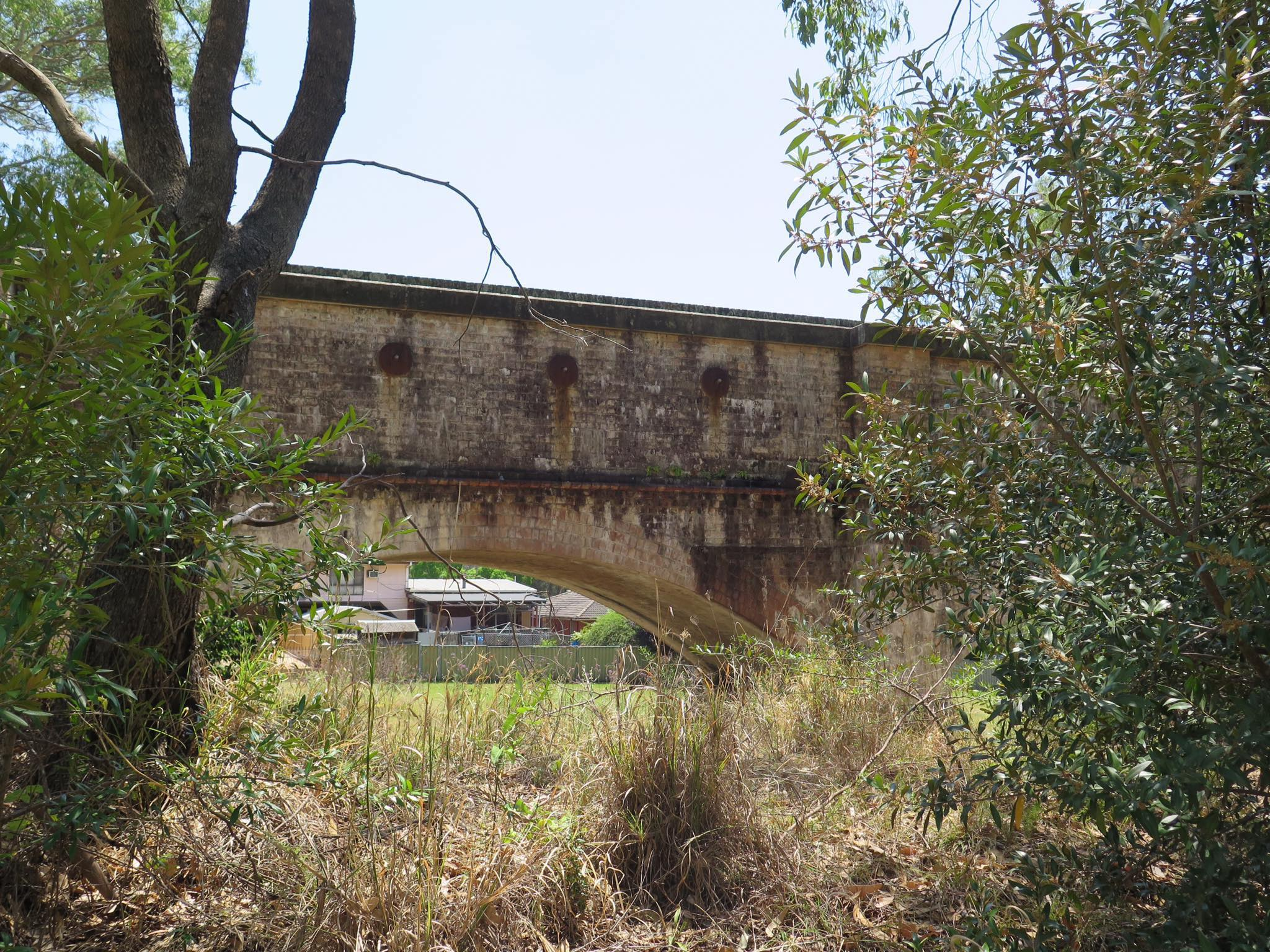
View from bushy shrubs

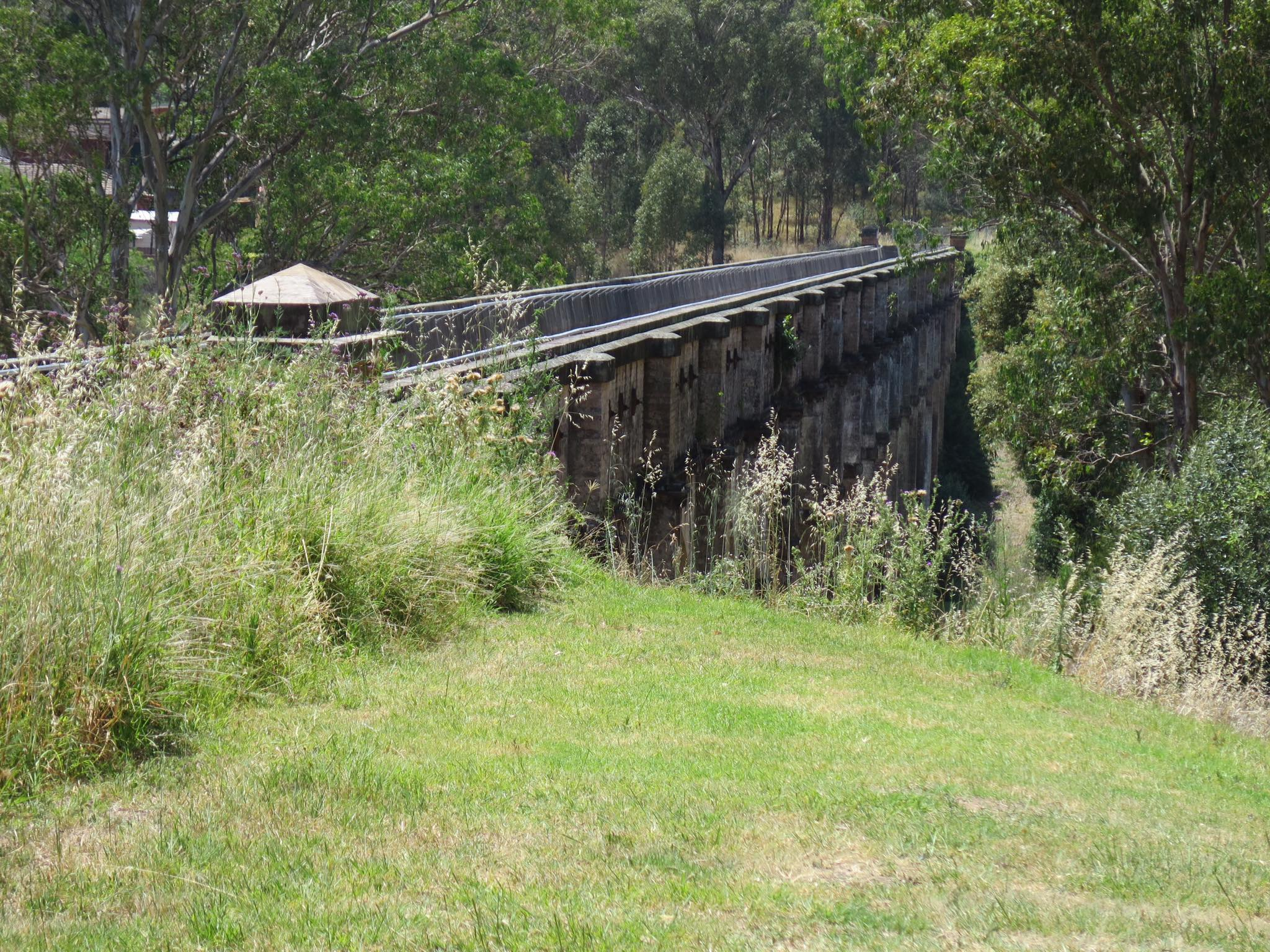
Exterior view of cycle/track way on the bridge

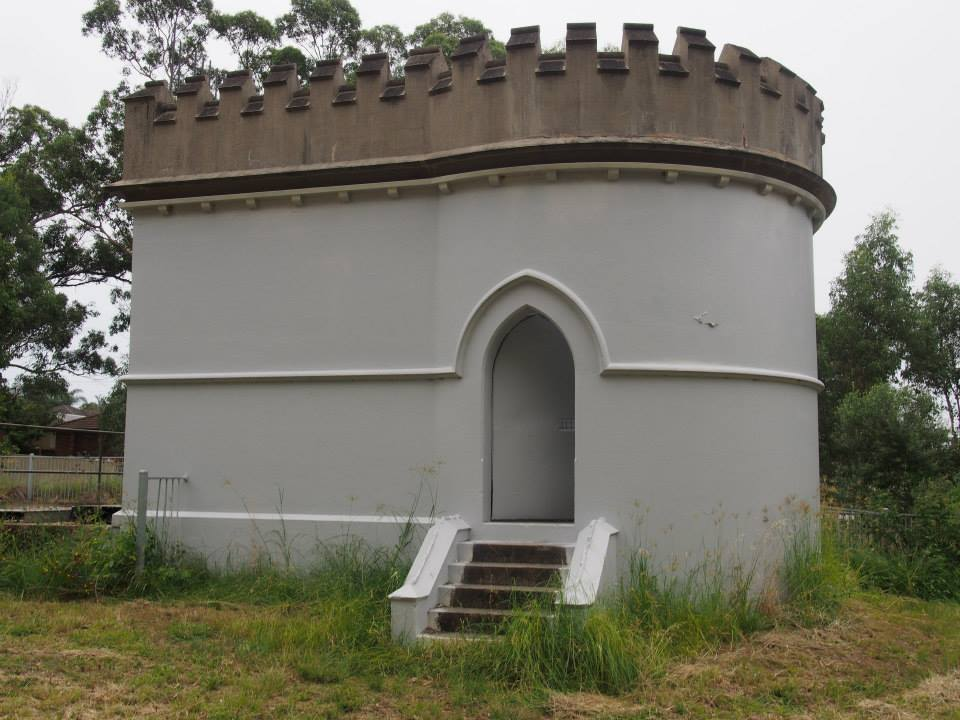
The syphon

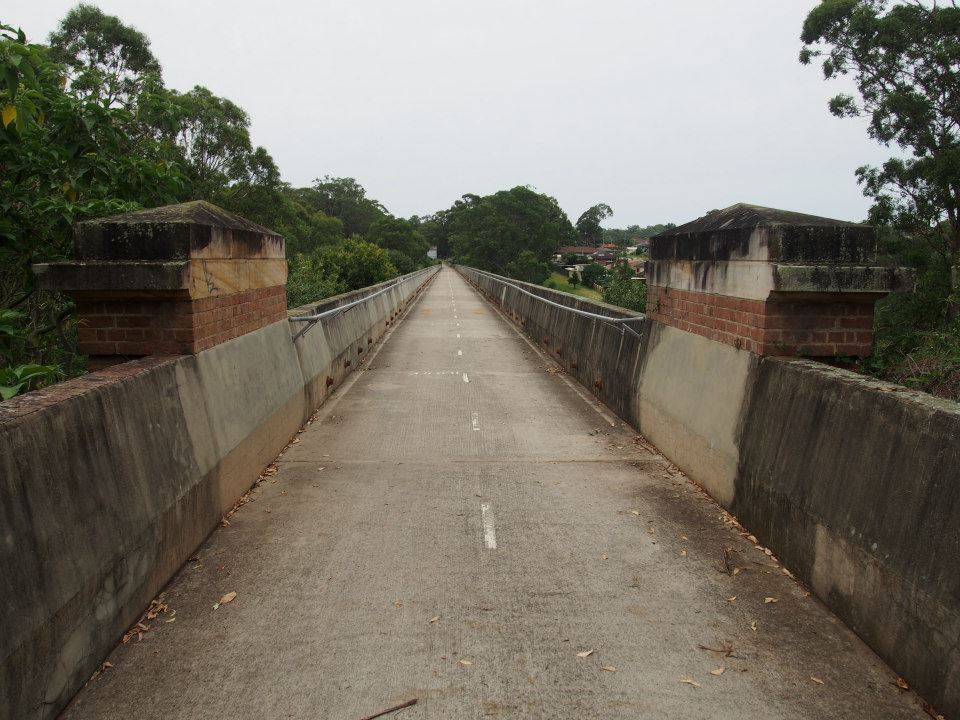
The walking track within the bridge

== See also ==
- Bankstown Reservoir, historical water supply still in use
- Lansdowne Bridge, historical bridge in western Sydney
