= Prospect Hill (New South Wales) =

Hill in Sydney, New South Wales, Australia

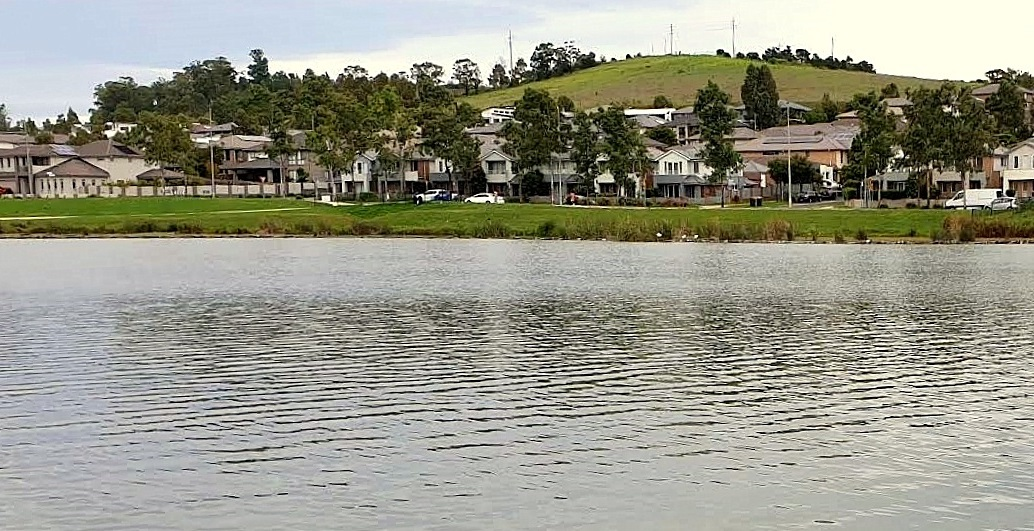
- View of the hill from Pemulwuy Lake

Highest point
- Elevation: 117 m (384 ft)
- Coordinates: 33.81456°S 150.92672°E

Dimensions
- Area: 0.34 km^{2} (0.13 mi^{2})

Naming
- Native name: Mar-rong

Geography
- Location within Sydney
- Country: Australia
- State: New South Wales
- Region: Greater Western Sydney
- Local government areas: Cumberland Council (eastern end); Blacktown City Council (western end)

Geology
- Rock age(s): Triassic (Wianamatta Shale); Early Jurassic (igneous rock)
- Rock type(s): Igneous rock Intrusive rock Laccolith; Shale

New South Wales Heritage Register
- Official name: Prospect Hill; Bellevue (Hill); Mar-Rong Reserve
- Type: State heritage (landscape)
- Designated: 17 October 2003
- Reference no.: 1662
- Type: Historic Landscape
- Category: Landscape – Cultural

Prospect Hill is a heritage-listed hill in Pemulwuy and Prospect in the greater western region of Sydney, New South Wales, Australia. Situated about 30 kilometres (19 miles) west of central Sydney, the hill is Sydney's largest body of igneous rock and is higher than the ridges of the Cumberland Plain around it, with its present-day highest point being 117 metres (384 feet) high, although before its summit was quarried away it rose to a height of 131 metres (430 feet) above sea level.

Prospect Hill is a free-standing hillock which is disconnected from Marrong Reserve (Note: The New South Wales State Heritage Register does include the northern half of Marrong Reserve as part of Prospect Hill, though other mappings of the area exclude the Reserve.) to the south at a saddle by Butu Wargun Drive. Prospect Hill is a “nodal point” of the Cumberland Plain. Its summit affords a “goodly prospect” west to the Blue Mountains and east to the man-made landmarks of central Sydney. People have walked round and over Prospect Hill for 30,000 years and have recognised it as a landmark, a meeting place and a boundary. For today's Australians it has historic significance, aesthetic values and commercial values. Owned by Boral Limited and CSIRO, the site was added to the New South Wales State Heritage Register on 17 October 2003.

Oval in shape, the hill has historical significance as one of the first places in the fledgling Colony of New South Wales where liberated convicts were granted land to farm. Furthermore, the settlements on Prospect Hill were a focus of significant antagonism between the indigenous people and the European settlers throughout the 1790s. For over 180 years quarrying of the igneous rock there, mainly teschenite, for roadstone and other building materials has been an important activity. The hill started to form around 200 million years ago when volcanic material from the Earth's core was thrust upwards and then sideways into joints in the layers of Triassic shales of the Cumberland Plain Woodland.

== History ==
=== Indigenous history ===
The area of Prospect Reservoir is an area of known Aboriginal occupation, with favourable camping locations along the Eastern Creek and Prospect Creek catchments, and in elevated landscapes to the south. There is also evidence to suggest that the occupation of these lands continued after European contact, through discovery of intermingled glass and stone flakes in archaeological surveys of the place. The area was settled by Europeans by 1789.

=== European discovery ===
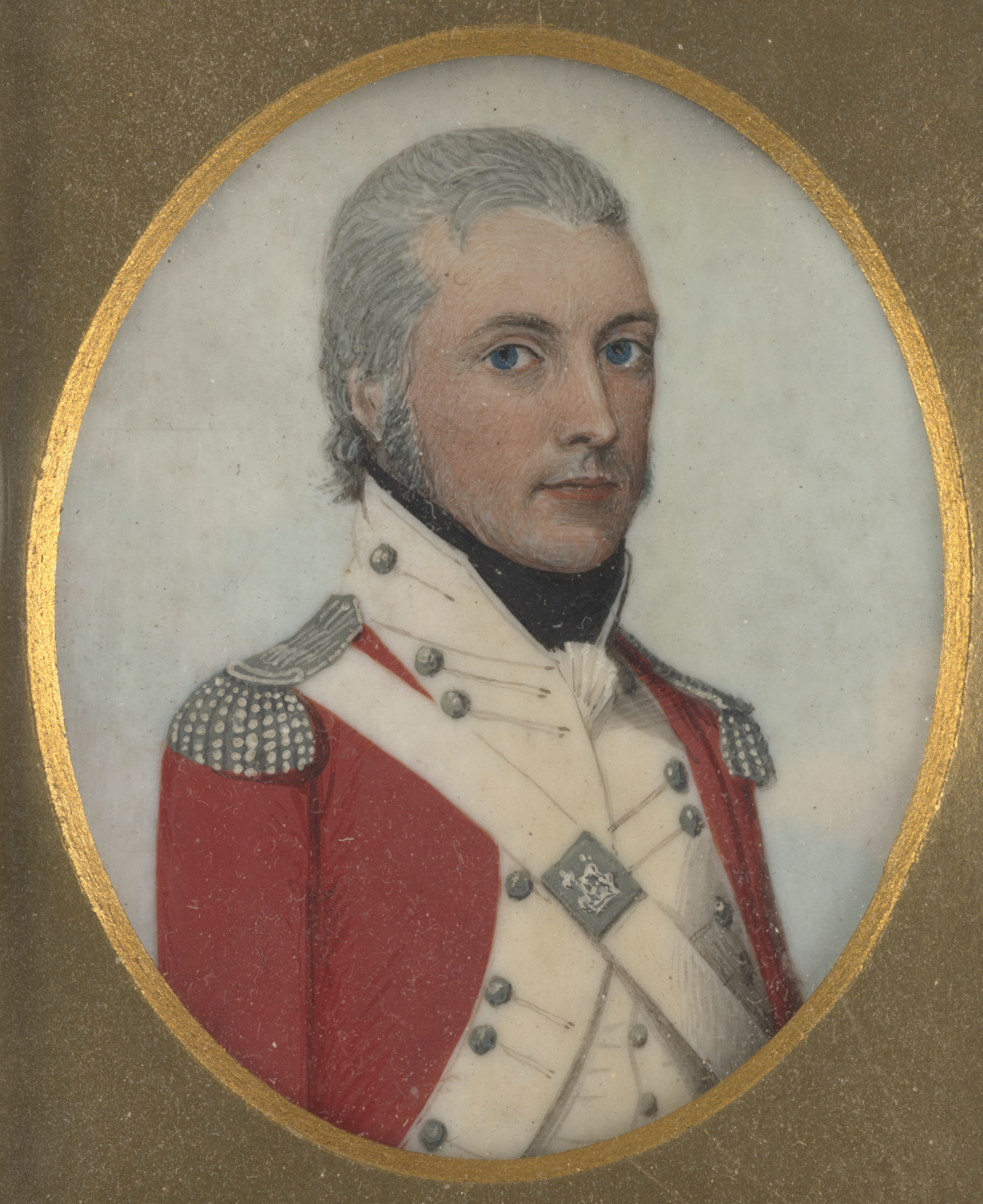
Watkin Tench, who was the first European to have been recorded as climbing the hill.

Very early after first settlement, on 26 April 1788, an exploration party heading west led by Governor Phillip, climbed Prospect Hill. An account by Phillip states that the exploration party saw from Prospect Hill, "for the first time since we landed Carmathen [sic] Hills (Blue Mountains) as likewise the hills to the southward". Phillip's "Bellevue" (Prospect Hill) acquired considerable significance for the new settlers. Prospect Hill provided a point from which distances could be meaningfully calculated, and became a major reference point for other early explorers. Statements that Prospect Hill is the hill named Belle-Vue by Governor Phillip on its ascent by his expedition in April 1788 are unsubstantiated in contemporary record.

When Captain-Lieutenant Watkin Tench made another official journey to the west in 1789, he began his journey with reference to Prospect Hill, which commanded a view of the great chain of mountains to the west. A runaway convict, George Bruce, used Prospect Hill as a hideaway from soldiers in the mid-1790s. The first recorded ascent of Prospect Hill by a colonist is that of Tench and his party on 26 June 1789. While there is no documentary evidence of Tench having named Prospect Hill, there is no doubt that it is in fact the hill that was shortly afterwards known by that name. In view of Tench's literary allusions to Milton's Paradise Lost, it seems highly probable that the experience of climbing it reminded him of the "goodly prospect of some forein land first-seen" by Milton's scout and that it was indeed Tench who first named it.

The earliest written reference to the name Prospect Hill is probably the account of an after-dinner walk from Parramatta to the hill by Governor Phillip and Lieutenant (later Governor) Philip Gidley King in April 1790. King's account shows that the name Prospect Hill had become established by then. On 18 July 1791 Phillip placed a number of men on the eastern and southern slopes of Prospect Hill, as the soils weathered from the basalt cap were richer than the sandstone derived soils of the Cumberland Plain. The grants, mostly 12 hectares (30 acres), encircled Prospect Hill.

=== Aboriginal and European conflict ===
The arrival of the first settlers prompted the first organised Aboriginal resistance to the spread of settlement, with the commencement of a violent frontier conflict in which Pemulwuy and his Bidjigal clan played a central role. Eventually, a reconciliation was started by the Aboriginal people, negotiated by their women and one of the Prospect Hill settlers, John Kennedy. On 1 May 1801 Governor King took drastic action, issuing a public order requiring that Aboriginal people around Parramatta, Prospect Hill and Georges River should be "driven back from the settlers' habitations by firing at them".

With the death of Pemulwuy, the main resistance leader, in 1802, Aboriginal resistance gradually diminished near Parramatta, although outer areas were still subject to armed hostilities. Prompted by suggestions to the Reverend Samuel Marsden by local Prospect Aboriginal groups that a conference should take place "with a view of opening the way to reconciliation", Marsden promptly organised a meeting near Prospect Hill. At the meeting, held on 3 May 1805, local Aboriginal representatives discussed with Marsden ways of ending the restrictions and indiscriminate reprisals inflicted on them by soldiers and settlers in response to atrocities committed by other Aboriginal clans. The meeting was significant because a group of Aboriginal women and a young free settler at Prospect named John Kennedy acted as intermediaries. The conference led to the end of the conflict for the Aboriginal clans around Parramatta and Prospect.

=== Land use ===
In 1791 Governor Phillip started granting plots of land (mostly 12 to 28 hectares (30 to 70 acres)) to emancipated convicts. Thirteen grants of land at Prospect Hill were made in July 1791. In 1799 Ensign William Cummings of the New South Wales Corps was granted 30 hectares (75 acres) at Prospect Hill. From its commencement in 1791 with the early settlement of the area, agricultural use of the land continued at Prospect Hill. Much of the land appears to have been cleared by the 1820s and pastoral use of the land was well established by then. When Governor Macquarie paid a visit to the area in 1810, he was favourably impressed by the comfortable conditions that had been created.

Early grazing practices cleared the entire hill of trees. Quarrying in the area began in the 1820s and naturalist Charles Darwin visited Prospect Hill in January 1836, to observe the geology. By the latter part of the 19th century coarse-grained picrite, and other doloritic rock types were being extracted from William Lawson's estate on the west and north sides of the Hill. The land was farmed from 1806 to 1888 when the Prospect Reservoir was built. By the 1870s, with the collapse of the production of cereal grains across the Cumberland Plain, the Prospect Hill area appears to have largely been devoted to livestock. The dwellings of the earliest settlers largely appear to have been removed by this stage. By the time that any mapping was undertaken in this vicinity, most of these structures had disappeared, making their locations difficult to pinpoint. Quarrying of the basalt plug at Prospect Hill was well underway by the mid-nineteenth century.

=== Modern history ===
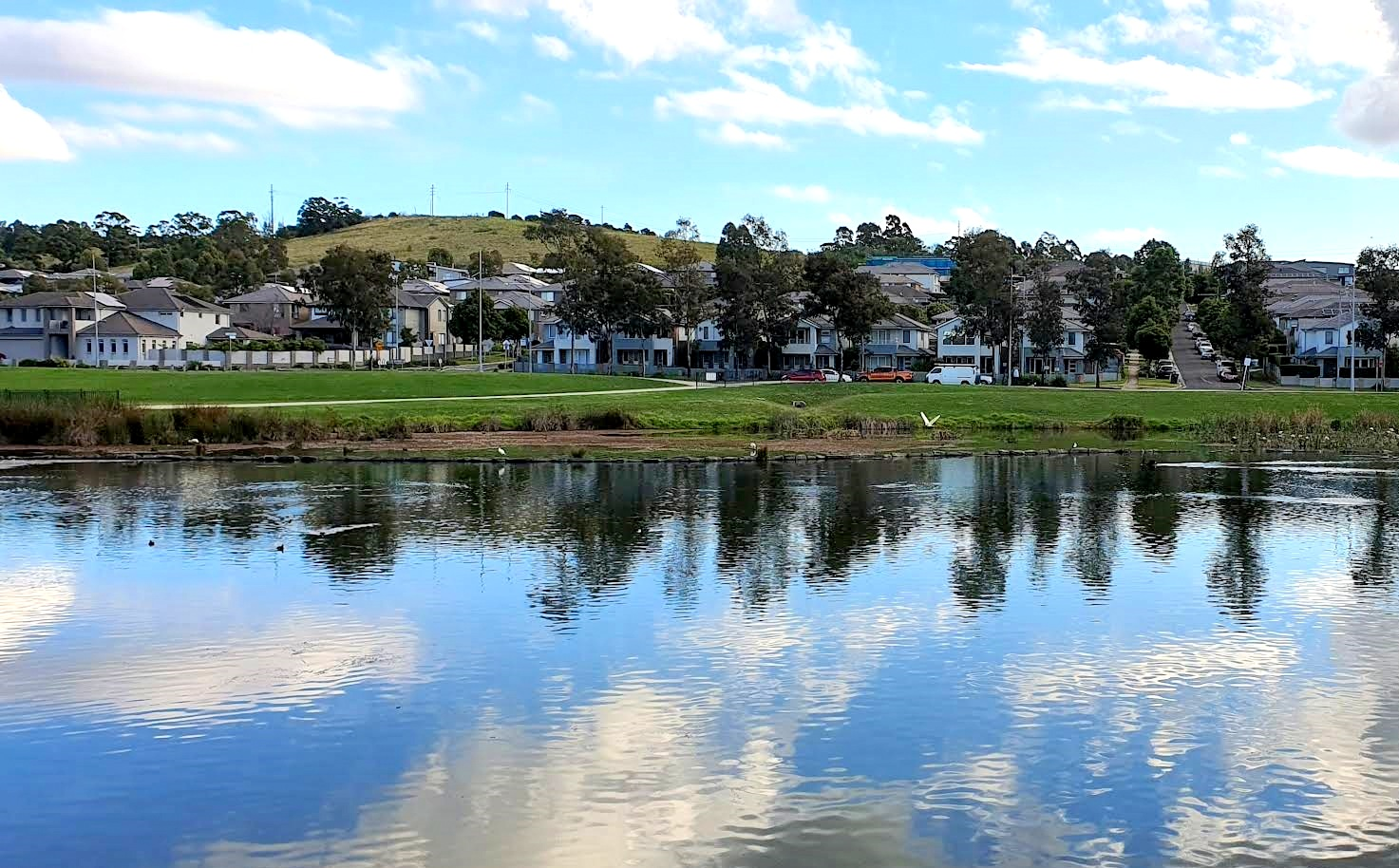
Residential zone surrounding the hill

By the early twentieth century, Prospect Hill land had been acquired by quarrying firms anxious to expand their land holdings near this valuable source of raw material. In 1925, the Widemere Quarry Line was a private railway line that began serving the Widemere Quarry at the southern end of the quarry until 1945. The bulk of the present CSIRO site was acquired by the Commonwealth in 1946, and a further 15 hectares was acquired in 1963. In the early 1950s the site became operational and sheep were pastured for research purposes. Prospect Hill was for many years the primary source of road-stone for the city's expanding infrastructure until the reserves of dolerite were exhausted. The Greystanes estate was eventually bought by quarrying interests.

In 1998 Boral reviewed its holdings with a view to future redevelopment as its quarry neared the end of its life. The then Minister for Urban Affairs and Planning took over planning powers for the employment area in November 2000 and approved the Employment Precinct Plan in June 2001, approving subdivision and associated works in the northern employment lands later in June 2001. In 2000, the CSIRO site has an area of 57.15 hectares (141.2 acres) and is the primary research centre of the Division of Animal Production. Long-term pastoral use on much of Prospect Hill has ensured the site retains its historical links and archaeological potential. However, Prospect Hill is under immediate threat from development, which has the potential to impact upon the significance of the site. This includes the development for residential/employment purposes and new development proposals such as a proposed flagpole to be erected on Prospect Hill commemorating Federation.

== Geography ==
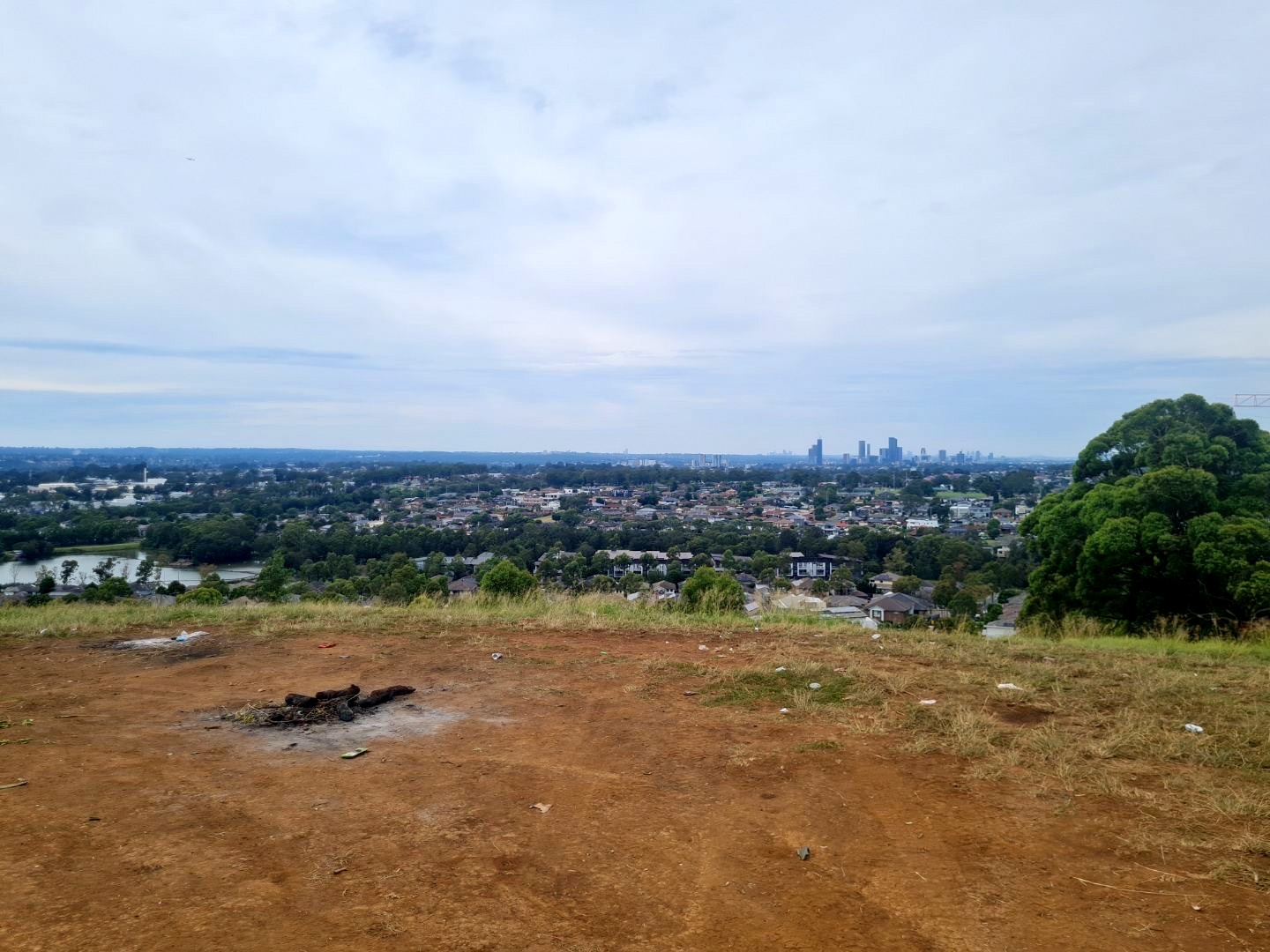
View from the hill to the west showing suburban Pemulwuy and the Parramatta skyline

Prospect Hill is a free-standing hillock that is visible from the junction of Blacktown Road and the Great Western Highway. Access to this summit is from Reconciliation Rise from the south, Clunies Ross Street from the west (which is the main access point) and Durawi Street from the east. The walk to Prospect Hill features sections of slippery, uneven clayey paths and several steep, elevated stretches, and is not formally maintained, which can make the ascent challenging, particularly after rainfall. The ridge between the hill and Marrong Reserve to the south was cut through by a quarry road, now improved as Butu Wargun Drive but with a barrier to vehicular traffic at the point where it crosses the ridge. The hill was a popular picnic spot in the 1920s. The hill is 112 metres (367 feet) above sea level. Moreover, the hill is an important venue to the Aboriginal community during the annual NAIDOC Week and Reconciliation Day, in addition to it being the site of focus for school excursions.

Lying centrally in the Cumberland Plain and dominating the landscape of the area, Prospect Hill is Sydney's largest body of igneous rock and rises to a height of 117 metres above sea level. The hill is located between the south-west corner of CSIRO Division of Animal Production site and the south-east corner of the Boral Resources (NSW) site at Greystanes. The CSIRO portion of Prospect Hill is generally cleared for pasture grasses, with remnant stands of native vegetation along a creek line that runs from north to south along the site. The portion of Prospect Hill located within the Boral site has remnant stands of trees and has been partially used as part of the Boral Brickworks operation.

The first settlement of the area occurred in 1791 on the eastern and southern slopes of Prospect Hill, however no buildings dating from the 18th or 19th century remain above ground. A number of the original boundaries of the Prospect land grants of 1791 can be identified when looking east across the CSIRO site from Prospect Hill. On the slope of Prospect Hill, north of the hilltop, is an abandoned quarry dating to the later part of the 19th century. The site is a former industrial building, agricultural farms, quarry, rural housing, research facility and pastoral property and now industrial building, housing, brick quarry and pastoral property.

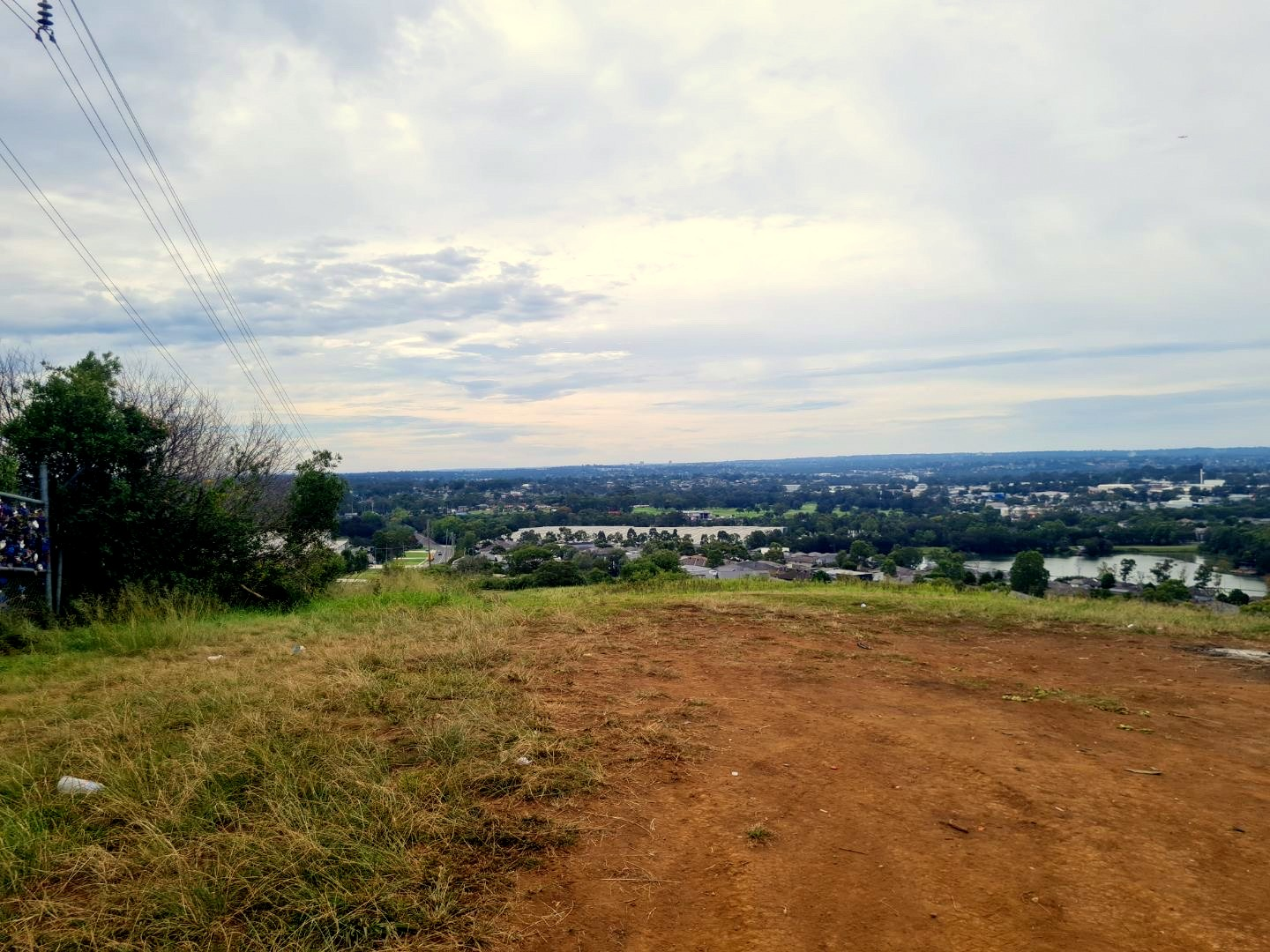
The summit of hill, looking towards the North Shore

=== Geology ===
In the Sydney Basin, insignificant igneous activity took place in the Early Jurassic (i.e. 210 million years ago), Late Mesozoic (i.e. 100-90 million years ago) and Cenozoic eras (i.e. 65 million years ago). The Early Jurassic activity resulted in the shaping of the Prospect dolerite intrusion, which unequivocally points that the hill had a volcanic origin. When Australia, then part of the Gondwana supercontinent, began to break up and drift away from Antarctica and Zealandia 80 million years ago, this may have also caused a period of volcanic activity along the east coast, as breakup tension caused deep faults in the continental crust allowing magma to ascent from the mantle regions below the earth's surface.

The eroded residue of the volcanic core forms Prospect Hill, which was battered down over millions of years to a small bulge in the generally flat lands of western Sydney. The dome is referred to as a doleritic laccolith. The next stage of natural development, which has lasted over 60 million years, has been the slow erosion of the overlying layers of sedimentary rock by the flow of rainwater, which eventually laid bare the edges of the volcanic and metamorphic rocks of the intrusion.

The hill contains a slender, chilled margin of fine-grained basalt with most of the mass of the intrusion being made up of minerals such as picrite, dolerite, and as well as volcanic material. Volcanic rocks on the hill are predominantly mafic. In the 1960s, small amount of gold was discovered in a sample test, and since then no more has been found.

== Heritage listing ==
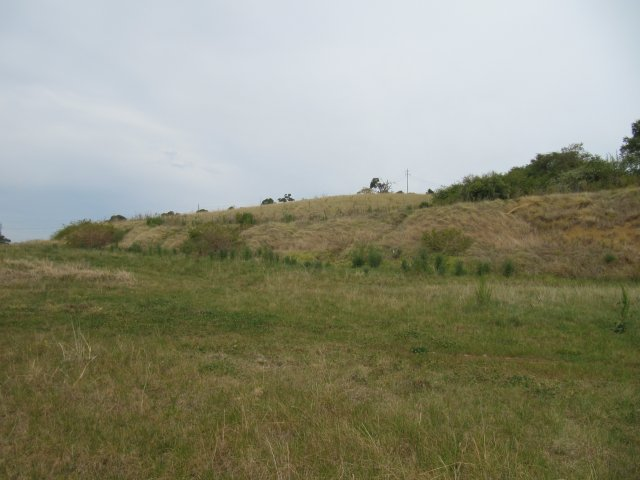
Through its ongoing pastoral and rural use, the hill has the potential to provide archaeological evidence of early farming practice and settlement.

As at 19 February 2001, the Prospect Hill area had state significance due to its unique combination of significant landscape feature, potential archaeological site, and association with important historical phases. As a dolerite outcrop rising to a height of 117 metres (384 ft) AHD, Prospect Hill is a rare geological and significant topographic feature providing expansive views across the Cumberland Plain. The site is significant as a major reference point for early explorers from 1788, and as the site of a number of the earliest farms in New South Wales, which were established in 1791.

Prospect Hill is also associated with Aboriginal frontier warfare during the early days of the colony, and as the site of one of the first Aboriginal/ European reconciliation meetings held in 1805 involving Samuel Marsden and Prospect Aboriginal groups. The landscape of Prospect Hill is likely to be one of the only remaining areas of rural land within the local and regional area that has retained its long-term pastoral use since the earliest days of the colony.

=== Criteria ===
Prospect Hill was listed on the New South Wales State Heritage Register on 17 October 2003 having satisfied the following criteria.

The place is important in demonstrating the course, or pattern, of cultural or natural history in New South Wales.

Prospect Hill is historically significant as the site of a number of the earliest farms in New South Wales, with a number of time-expired convicts settled on the land in 1791 by Governor Phillip. As a significant landmark on the Cumberland Plain, Prospect Hill provided an important reference point for early explorers from 1788, and played a role in the earliest exploration of the east coast of Australia. Prospect Hill is also associated with an important phase of Aboriginal/European contact; firstly through Pemulwuy's guerilla warfare in the area between 1797 and 1802, and in 1805 as the site of a reconciliation meeting involving Samuel Marsden.

Prospect Hill has historical associations arising from the use of the site over time; including the Aboriginal frontier leader Pemulwuy, Samuel Marsden and those earliest former convicts who settled at Prospect Hill including William Butler, Samuel Griffiths and William Parish.

The place is important in demonstrating aesthetic characteristics and/or a high degree of creative or technical achievement in New South Wales.

Prospect Hill has aesthetic significance as Sydney's largest body of igneous rock, which rises to a height of 117 metres and provides expansive views across the Cumberland Plain. The large dolerite formation of Prospect Hill is a rare geological and landmark topographic feature, lying centrally within the Cumberland Plain. Through the long-term use of the site for pastoral use, the landscape retains an essentially rural character, which is becoming rare in the locality.

The place has strong or special association with a particular community or cultural group in New South Wales for social, cultural or spiritual reasons.

Through its continued use for research purposes over the last 40 years, the CSIRO complex, which is located at the foot of Prospect Hill, has significance for those employees who have worked at the research facility, and in particular for those scientists who have carried out work which is of importance to Australia's cultural history.

The place has potential to yield information that will contribute to an understanding of the cultural or natural history of New South Wales.

Through its continual pastoral/rural use since 1791, Prospect Hill has the potential to provide archaeological evidence of early historical settlement or agricultural techniques used.

The place possesses uncommon, rare or endangered aspects of the cultural or natural history of New South Wales.

Prospect Hill is unique as a significant landmark site, and through its ability to demonstrate historical links with early European exploration and settlement as well as Aboriginal conflict and reconciliation, with the landscape retaining its continual pastoral use since the early days of the colony.

== See also ==
- Prospect, a suburb nearby
- Prospect Nature Reserve, a hill west of this summit
- Prospect Reservoir, a nearby reservoir
- Lower Prospect Canal Reserve
- Geography of Sydney
