= Smithfield, New South Wales =

Smithfield
- Suburb
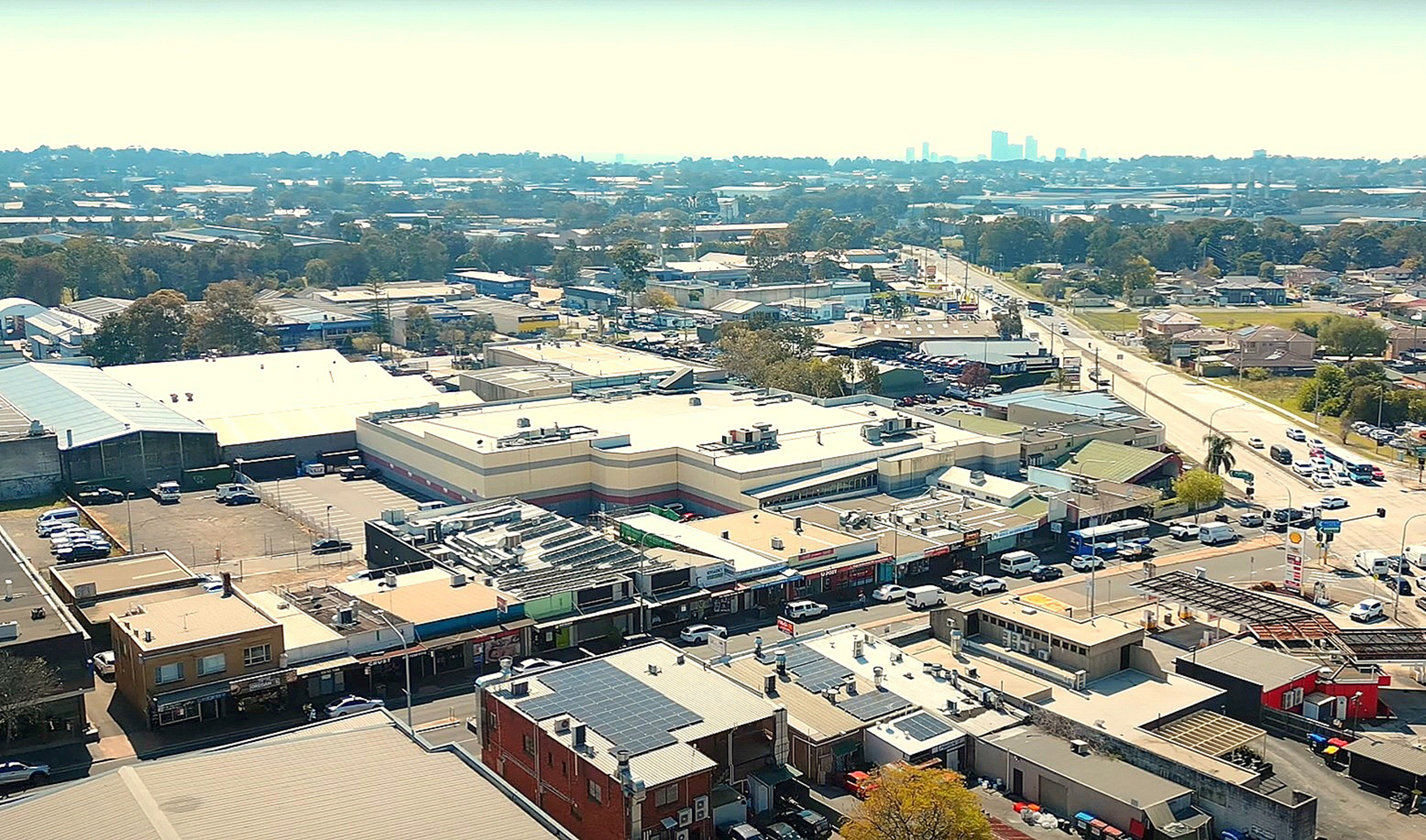
- Smithfield Town Centre along The Horsley Drive

- Interactive map of Smithfield
- Country: Australia
- State: New South Wales
- City: Sydney
- LGAs: City of Fairfield; Cumberland Council
- Location: 31 km (19 mi) west of Sydney
- Established: 1836

Government
  - State electorates: Prospect; Fairfield
  - Federal division: McMahon
- Elevation: 23 m (75 ft)

Population
  - Total: 13,160 (2021 census)
- Postcode: 2164
- Mean max temp: 23.1 °C (73.6 °F)
- Mean min temp: 12.2 °C (54.0 °F)
- Annual rainfall: 870.6 mm (34.28 in)
Suburbs around Smithfield
Pemulwuy	Greystanes	Merrylands West
Wetherill Park/Smithfield West	Smithfield	Woodpark
Fairfield West	Fairfield Heights	Guildford West

Smithfield is a suburb of Sydney, in the state of New South Wales, Australia. Smithfield is located 31 kilometres (19 mi) west of the Sydney central business district, in the local government areas of the City of Fairfield and Cumberland Council. Located in the Greater Western Sydney region, the suburb is one of the largest in Fairfield City by area. The suburb is a mix of residential, industrial, recreational, rural and commercial areas, and is mostly characterized by low-density housing.

Established in 1836, Smithfield was the first major settlement of the Fairfield LGA. The original 1838 summary plan of Smithfield shows the suburb laid out in a grid pattern with most of the streets having the same names as they do today. The name of Smithfield is linked with the cattle markets of London and Dublin. In the 19th century, Smithfield used to be a semi-rural village, before becoming a large commercial centre in the early 20th century, in addition to featuring a significant employment centre in south-western Sydney.

Located partially in the suburb, the Smithfield-Wetherill Park Industrial Estate is the largest industrial estate in the southern hemisphere and is the centre of manufacturing and distribution in greater western Sydney. A working class area, Smithfield is also multicultural, with over 130 different nationalities and 70 different languages being spoken.

== History ==
Aboriginal people from the Cabrogal tribe, a sub-group of the Gandangara tribe, have lived in the Fairfield area for over 30,000 years. In the area that is now Smithfield, the tribe was found near the banks of Prospect Creek.

=== Early settlement ===
White settlement began in the area in the early 19th century. The first significant settlement in the Fairfield area was at Smithfield due to its good soil on the Prospect Creek banks, a reliable water supply, and proximate access to Parramatta and Prospect. In June 1791 convicts John Williams and John Brown were granted 50 and 60 acres of land between Prospect Hill and present-day Hassall Street in Smithfield, and only six settlers remained there. Their grants can be considered as the first land grants to appear in the Fairfield local government area and ‘the first white settlers of the future Fairfield City district’, according to historian Vance George. In 1803, homeless children were becoming a problem after convicts turned their children out into the streets. As a consequence, Governor Philip Gidley King, put aside a large area of 12,300 acres (50 km^{2}) for a Male Orphan School. By 1836, some of this land was offered for sale by the colonial government of the time. Timber-cutting provided the income of the early settlers.

Some of the best farming land was in the district to the west and southwest of the Smithfield area. Smithfield comprised the original grant of 2,118 acres (9 km^{2}) given to James Chisholm, and the area was initially called 'Chisholm's Bush'. John Ryan Brenan (1798–1868), an attorney who was appointed Police Magistrate in 1836, bought 1,650 acres (7 km^{2}) here. After subdividing the estate, Brennan initially titled his land 'Donnybrook' (after the Irish market town of the same name). Early settlers, many being Irish Catholics, were attracted to Smithfield by its good soil, dependable water supply and easy access to the Colony's established towns. Brennan Street is where the cattle sale yards were originally located. Sale yards opened in 1841, but the project to establish a village around the yards failed. English farmers mostly settled on lands along the Sherwood (Note: The Municipal District of Prospect and Sherwood was the former name of the local government area from 1872 to 1927. The area is now part of the Cumberland City Council local government area.) side of the Prospect Creek and a small colony of Italians assembled together just north of the village, and for many years the whole region was renowned for its beautiful vineyards.

=== Colonial expansion ===
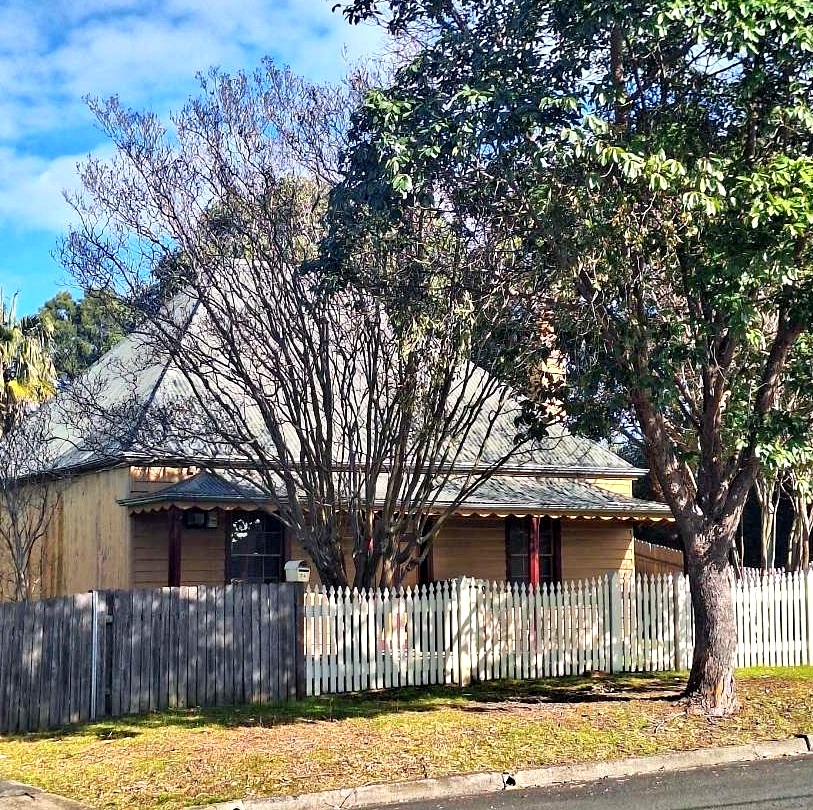
Now a heritage item, the Coleman Home, built in 1880, is the oldest surviving slab hut in the City of Fairfield.

In 1841, Victoria Street was a broad boulevard that ran through the wool market in the Queen's Square. The 'Smithfield Market and fair Green' was a semi-circular area that featured 42 stalls of various sizes for the sale of thousands of livestock, in addition to cheese and butter. In 1842, Brennan changed the name from Donnybrook to 'Smithfield Market, Town of Prospect' as he assumed the area would extend to the proximate village at Prospect Hill. In July 1842, Smithfield Market was pompously described as "...without exception the largest and best constructed in the world". The suburb's grid pattern of streets in the older areas were influenced by a marketplace near London.

According to historian John Wilkinson, the name of the project was swiftly diminished to Smithfield by common practice in the hope that cattle sales will be held there. Although Smithfield was more like a 'tent city' than a flourishing urban center (especially after the markets closed down in 1845), it still became a thriving commercial centre. In the subdivision, Brenan offered an extra adjoining allotment to any buyer who built a cottage with a brick chimney and enclosed the property with a fence. The public school opened in 1850 and by the 1880s Smithfield was well provided with churches, many of which still remain today as important relics of Smithfield's rich local heritage. The first recorded religious service in Smithfield was held by the Baptists in the 1840s, as many Baptists bought lands in the township to escape ridicule of their adult baptism in Cooks River. Their settlement in Smithfield was described as "carving out a new town in the wild bush". Although Smithfield had a large Irish Catholic population, the Catholic Church struggled to obtain acknowledgment by the early colonial power.

A national school building was established in January 1851, and it still is one of the state's oldest public school buildings. In the 1860s, Smithfield was mostly populated by vine growers, gardeners, wood timber cutters, orchards and tanneries. In 1866, Smithfield was a postal village lying on fertile lands in the Parish of Saint Luke and had a population of 500 people in a land that was reasonably woody. The village featured one Church of England (the first service in the wider area) and a Baptist chapel, in addition to two hotels called the ‘Lucky Bushman’ and ‘The Smithfield Inn’. Residents in the area were mostly farmers, fruit growers and workers at hide-tanning factories.

In 1871, the township had 264 residents. In the late 1880s, Smithfield was a prominent town in the areas, and it expanded in population due to the significant construction project of the Prospect reservoir. A slab cottage built in 1880 in what was the Queen's Square site (now Chifley Street) still remains in the area, in addition to being listed on the Fairfield City Council Heritage List since 1997. In 1887, J.a.M. Mclean established a vineyard called 'Kaluna' on The Horsley Drive until the land was subdivided in 1959. (Note: Today, McLean's vineyard occupies the site of Kaluna Avenue, with a nature reserve at the northern end of the street near Prospect Creek.)

=== Urban development ===
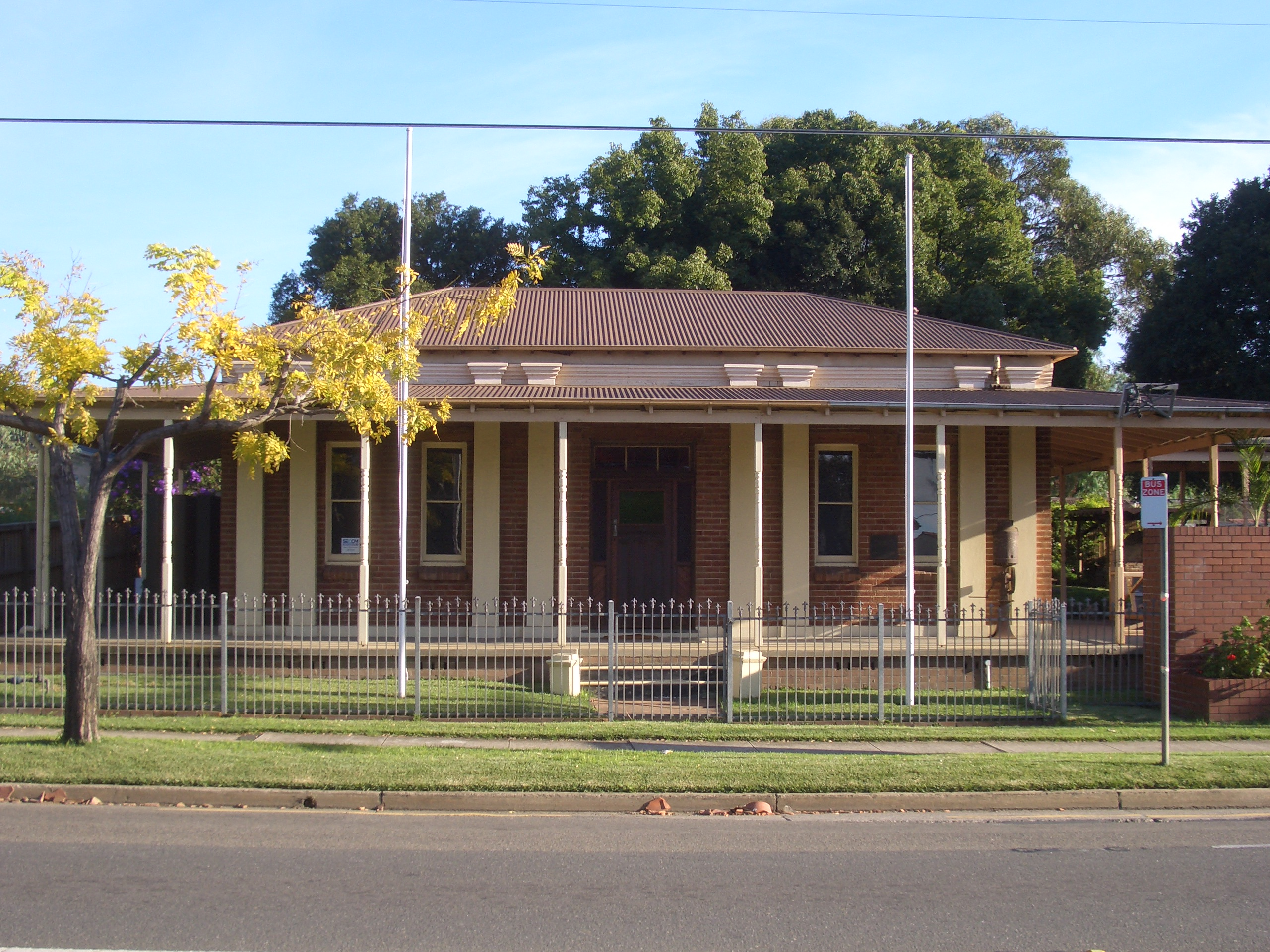
Smithfield Museum was a chamber for the Municipality between 1913 and 1920, before becoming a museum in 1980.

In 1888, an agreement was accomplished between Smithfield and Fairfield to become a merged municipal council; The ‘Smithfield and Fairfield Municipality’, which had a population of about 1200 and included 250 houses, before changing to 'Fairfield' in 1920, reflecting the growth of the Fairfield CBD. Although Fairfield's commercial area was growing during the 1890s to 1910s, Smithfield was still the district’s largest commercial and religious centre, which included various stores, shops and churches. A literary institute Hall was built in the early 1900s, and in 1913 it became the first ever movie theater in the district. Chifley Street used to be 'Water Street' until the 1950s. There was also George Street, which ran through what is now Rosford Park, while Dublin Street formerly extended north through the area now occupied by the park, where it connected with Gipps Road, until the park was established in the early 1980s.

In a 1918 news article by The Cumberland Argus and Fruitgrowers' Advocate, Smithfield was described as "one of the oldest villages in the greater Parramatta district" and lagging behind Fairfield CBD. In 1924, the Sydney and Suburban Blue Metal Quarries constructed the Widemere Quarry Line to connect the Booth mine at Prospect Hill with Fairfield railway station. The railway passed through what is now The Horsley Drive (then Smithfield Street) and Dublin Street, before closing in 1945. At this time, German, Italian, Maltese and Chinese immigration to the area started to grow. The Fairfield Motor Cycle Club formed in 1935 and it was provided a circuit track in Dublin Street, Smithfield, before closing down in the 1960s.

In the 1940s, the areas near Prospect Creek still had many dairies, vineyards and market gardens, including woodcutting industries as timber was still abundant, and Smithfield was still neither a rural township, nor a remarkably urban area. In the 1940s and 1950s, garbage dumps and sewerage outlets were installed in the suburb, and the area that is now Brenan Park was a landfill up until 1980, before becoming the aforementioned urban park. In 1970s, politician Janice Crosio stated she partook in local politics because she could not stand seeing Smithfield underwater during floods. In the early 1970s, millions of dollars were spent on demolishing older structures and constructing modern offices, in addition to establishing a supermarket in Smithfield Mall. In February 1990, the suburb was affected by the worst flooding in its history where six houses were inundated above the floor level. In 2010, a proposal to establish a new locality named Brenan Heights around Brenan Park was put to residents and property owners by ballot, but failed to gain sufficient community support. In February 2011, the suburb made national headlines when a light aircraft crash landed in Brenan Street, where it caused power loss to 7000 businesses and homes after the plane knocked down multiple power lines.

== Geography ==
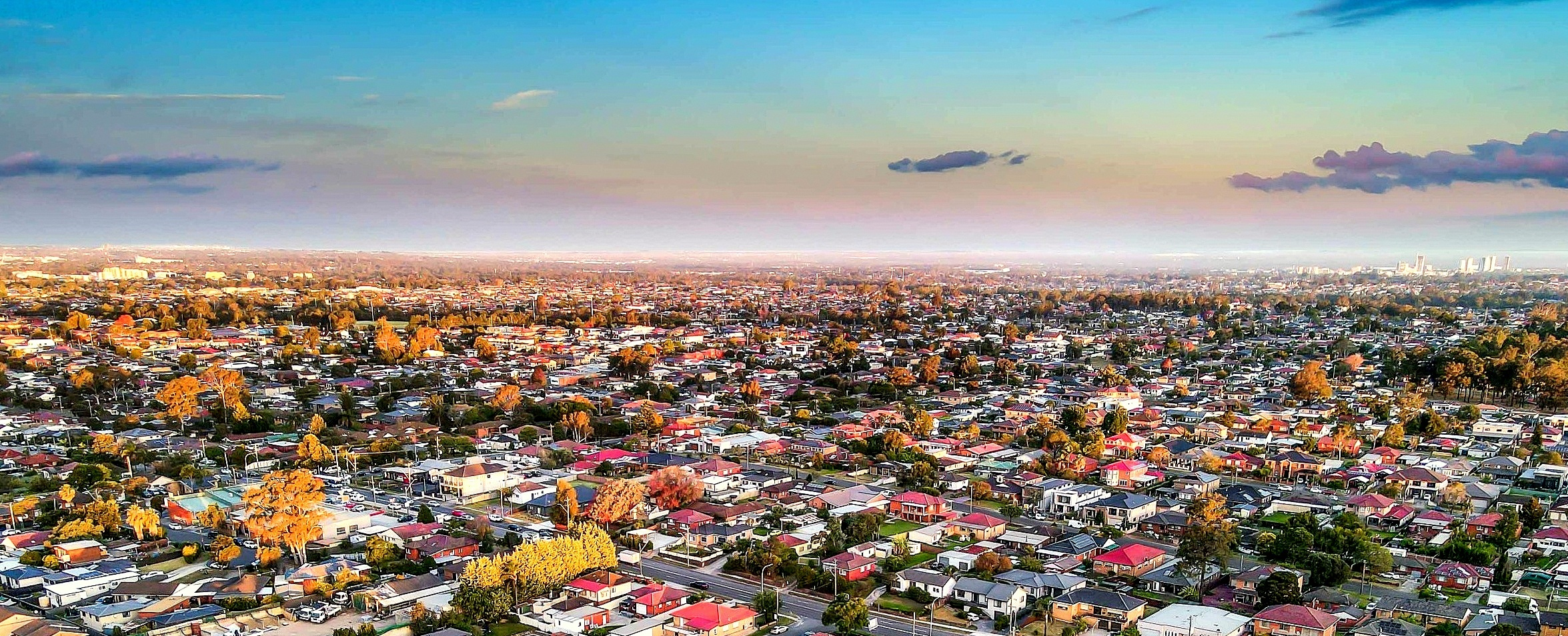
Southeast view of Smithfield, with the Liverpool skyline on the far right

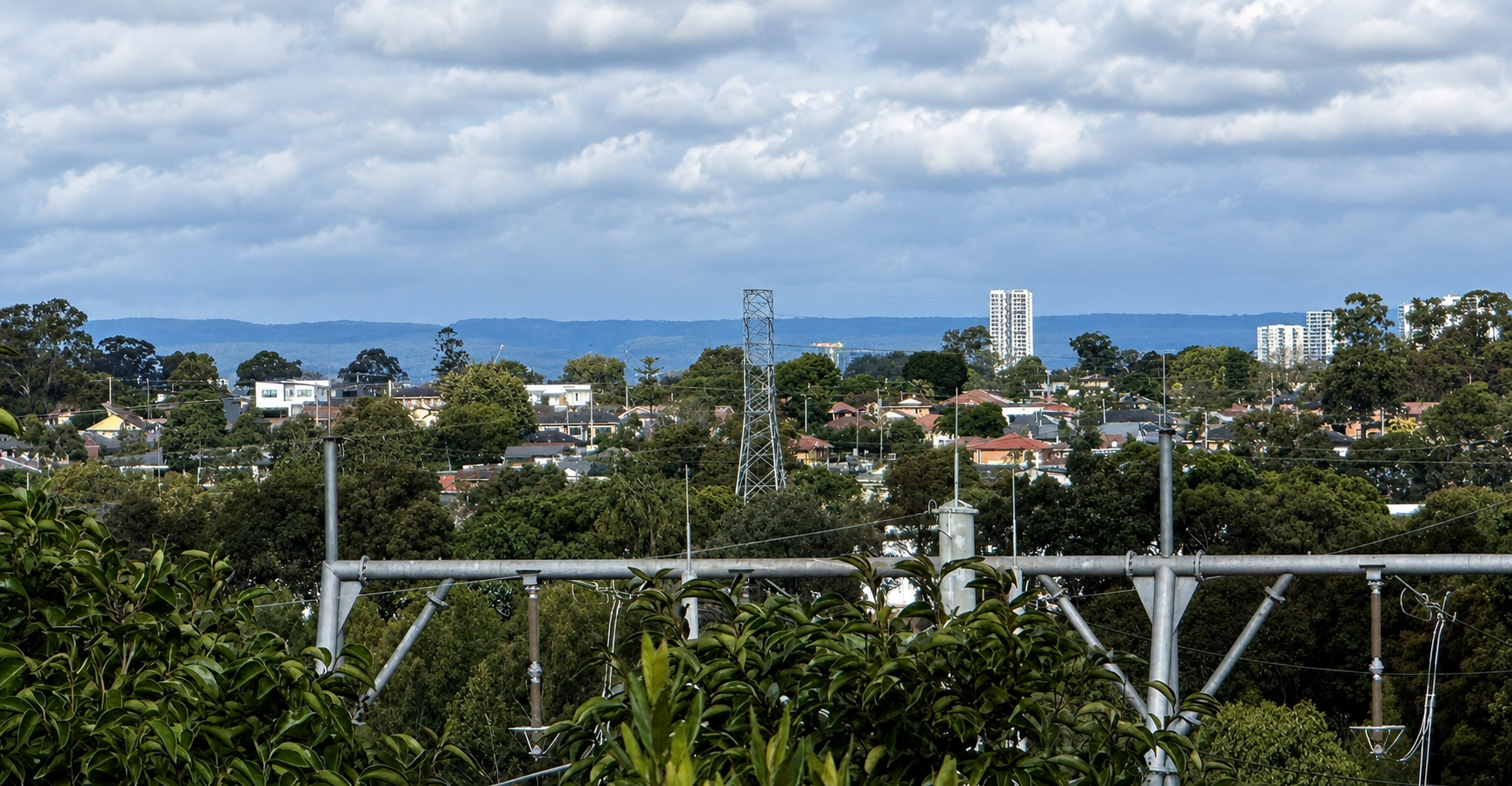
View of suburban Smithfield from Pemulwuy, showing predominantly low density housing, with the Liverpool skyline in the background.

The northern part of Smithfield, comprising the industrial precinct north of Prospect Creek, lies within the Cumberland City Council local government area, with the creek forming the local government boundary between Cumberland City Council and the City of Fairfield. This portion of the suburb is entirely industrial in character and contains no residential development, with all residential neighbourhoods located south of the creek within the City of Fairfield. The suburb incorporates Smithfield West, which is mostly a residential locality in the western portion of Smithfield, in addition to being an unofficial designation for the region westwards from Dublin Street to the boundary of Wetherill Park.

Smithfield is within the plant community called the Cumberland Plain Woodland and contains a small patch of the threatened Cooks River/Castlereagh Ironbark Forest (within Smithfield Cemetery), which feature Eucalyptus fibrosa, Melaleuca decora and Eucalyptus moluccana as the dominant canopy species. Somewhat hilly, Smithfield's altitude ranges from 20 to 55 m (66 to 180 ft) above sea level, with its highest elevations around Brenan Park, along its western boundary with Wetherill Park at Wetherill Street, and along its northeastern boundary with Woodpark and Greystanes. The lowest-lying areas are in the central and southeastern parts of the suburb.

The suburb is situated on the Cumberland Plain biogeographic region and it predominantly lies on the Middle Triassic Bringelly Shale (with the areas near Prospect Creek being on Cenozoic alluvial deposits). The Smithfield section of Cumberland Highway, known as Smithfield Road, has the highest recorded street-tree canopy cover in Smithfield, with approximately 12,898 m² of canopy. A geological database search undertaken for a site at 6 Herbert Place found no mapped faults, shear zones or schist-zone boundaries within a 1 km (0.62 mi) radius. The assessment, which used the New South Wales Government's Statewide Seamless Geology dataset, did however identify two mapped lineaments within the search area, approximately 389 m (1,276 ft) and 648 m (2,126 ft) from the site, respectively. Geologically, Smithfield lies within the Fairfield Basin, a broad synclinal structure forming part of the Cumberland Basin within the larger Sydney Basin. The area is predominantly underlain by rocks of the Wianamatta Group, whose weathering has produced the clay-rich soils and gently undulating terrain characteristic of the Cumberland Plain.

=== Climate ===
Smithfield has a humid subtropical climate (Köppen climate classification: Cfa) with warm to hot summers and mild to cool winters with sporadic rainfall throughout the year. It is usually a few degrees warmer than Sydney CBD on summer days and a few degrees cooler on winter nights. There could be a temperature differential of 5–10 °C (9–18 °F) in summer due to sea breezes in the coast that do not generally penetrate inland. The suburb receives less annual rain than Sydney CBD by about 300 mm (11.81 in). Late winter and early spring receive the least rainfall, whilst late summer and autumn receive more rain.

Climate data for Prospect Reservoir
Month	Jan	Feb	Mar	Apr	May	Jun	Jul	Aug	Sep	Oct	Nov	Dec	Year
Record high °C (°F)	47.0 (116.6)	46.4 (115.5)	39.5 (103.1)	37.1 (98.8)	29.4 (84.9)	25.6 (78.1)	26.5 (79.7)	29.4 (84.9)	35.0 (95.0)	39.0 (102.2)	42.0 (107.6)	44.4 (111.9)	47.0 (116.6)
Mean daily maximum °C (°F)	29.3 (84.7)	28.6 (83.5)	26.8 (80.2)	24.1 (75.4)	20.7 (69.3)	17.7 (63.9)	17.2 (63.0)	19.3 (66.7)	22.4 (72.3)	24.8 (76.6)	26.1 (79.0)	28.0 (82.4)	23.8 (74.8)
Daily mean °C (°F)	23.6 (74.5)	23.3 (73.9)	21.5 (70.7)	18.5 (65.3)	15.2 (59.4)	11.9 (53.4)	11.9 (53.4)	12.9 (55.2)	15.9 (60.6)	15.9 (60.6)	20.3 (68.5)	22.2 (72.0)	17.8 (64.0)
Mean daily minimum °C (°F)	18.0 (64.4)	18.0 (64.4)	16.2 (61.2)	12.9 (55.2)	9.7 (49.5)	6.1 (43.0)	6.6 (43.9)	6.6 (43.9)	9.5 (49.1)	12.1 (53.8)	14.5 (58.1)	16.4 (61.5)	12.3 (54.1)
Record low °C (°F)	10.0 (50.0)	10.8 (51.4)	7.9 (46.2)	3.6 (38.5)	1.2 (34.2)	−0.8 (30.6)	−0.6 (30.9)	−0.5 (31.1)	1.7 (35.1)	4.5 (40.1)	6.8 (44.2)	7.8 (46.0)	−0.8 (30.6)
Average precipitation mm (inches)	83.3 (3.28)	145.9 (5.74)	132.3 (5.21)	72.9 (2.87)	43.0 (1.69)	79.3 (3.12)	36.9 (1.45)	37.7 (1.48)	39.4 (1.55)	62.5 (2.46)	75.6 (2.98)	73.7 (2.90)	863.5 (34.00)
Average precipitation days (≥ 1mm)	8.3	8.7	9.2	6.5	5.3	7.0	5.6	4.2	5.1	6.6	8.2	8.2	82.9
Average afternoon relative humidity (%)	52	54	55	50	57	54	52	43	45	44	51	51	51
Source 1: Prospect Reservoir (1991–2018 averages)
Source 2: Prospect Reservoir (1965–2018 extremes) Horsley Park (1997–present extremes) Greystanes (monthly rainfall)

=== Recreational areas ===
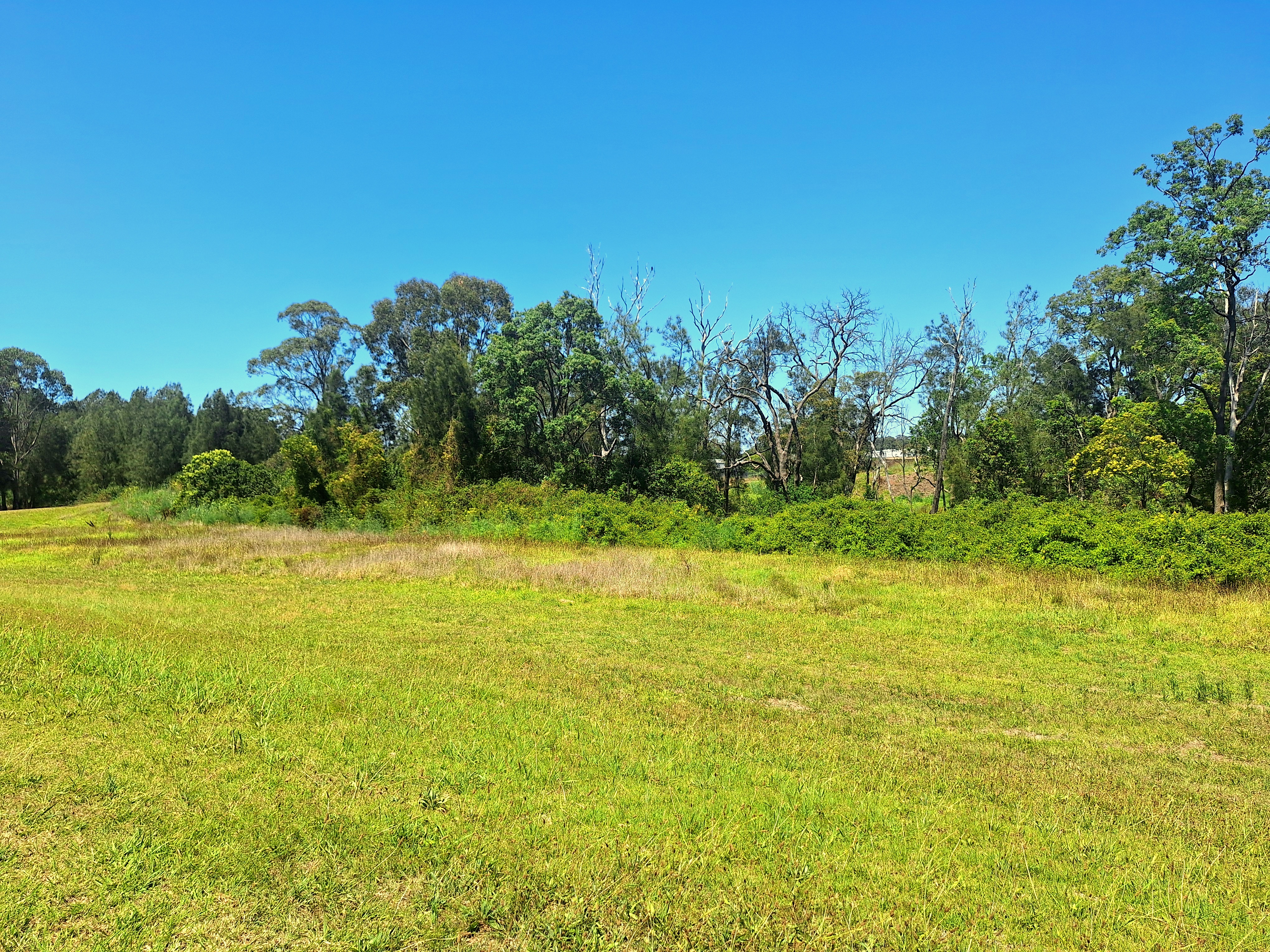
The riparian Swamp Oak Floodplain Forest along Prospect Creek, growing on alluvial soils, at Gipps Road Park

Brenan Park is a large recreational area, and one of the most prominent in Fairfield City, which features sports grounds, children's playgrounds and picnic areas. Rosford Street Reserve is a park in the northern part of the suburb featuring a large sports ground and an urban forest within the Prospect Creek riparian corridor. The reserve adjoins Long Street Park to the east, in the Cumberland City Council section of Smithfield, and Gipps Road Park to the northwest, in Greystanes.

Other large parks in the suburb include Smithfield Park on The Horsley Drive (which is the oldest park in Smithfield and features a large soccer field) and Prospect View Park, which also features a large sports field. Minor parks include Shamrock Park and Clarrie Atkins Park within the residential areas, while Mirkwood Reserve, Beersheba Reserve, Galilee Park, Tarrawarra Reserve and Arbela Park are located along the Prospect Creek riparian corridor, extending west to east towards Smithfield's eastern boundary. Tsyion Reserve and Judea Reserve, located along the Cumberland Highway, are passive bushland reserves comprising dense remnant eucalypt woodland and native understorey vegetation, remaining largely undeveloped as natural bushland corridors.

=== Hydrology ===
As urban development advanced in the area, many of the gullies and waterways that formerly drained runoff into Prospect Creek were replaced by stormwater pipes (one being the "Rosford Channel", that starts from Victoria Street). The Smithfield Overland Flow Catchment covers approximately 292 hectares (720 acres) in the north-eastern part of the City of Fairfield, encompassing parts of Smithfield, Fairfield Heights and Fairfield West. The highly urbanised catchment drains north-east via a network of stormwater pipes and overland flow paths into Prospect Creek, with the main drainage corridor running alongside the Cumberland Highway before discharging into the creek. The main stormwater drainage line runs beneath Cartela Crescent, Canara Place, Dublin Street and The Horsley Drive before discharging into Prospect Creek. A flood model representing 259 stormwater pits and 278 pipes identified several major overland flow paths and areas of significant flood risk, particularly near the Cumberland Highway and low-lying residential areas. Approximately 1,365 properties lie within the probable maximum flood (PMF) extent.

Several major overland flow paths originate in the upper catchment and convey stormwater towards the Cumberland Highway. Principal flow corridors follow Maud Street, Reserve Street and Rosemount Avenue in the south, Oxford Street and Brenan Street in the east, and O'Connell Street in the west before converging near the highway. Flood modelling found that the deepest overland flooding occurs in low-lying open space adjacent to the Cumberland Highway, particularly between Brenan Street and The Boulevard, where water depths typically range from 0.6 to 1.0 metres. Flood depths exceeding 1 metre occur between Rosemount Avenue and the Cumberland Highway, while isolated properties north of The Horsley Drive may experience depths of up to 1.2 metres during the 100-year annual recurrence interval (ARI) flood event. Blind Creek (also known as Blind Gully) forms part of the Smithfield catchment, flowing along the eastern side of the Cumberland Highway before joining Prospect Creek. Despite proposals to retain a green corridor, most of Blind Creek was piped underground in the late 1980s and became known as the Smithfield Main Drain.

== Transport ==
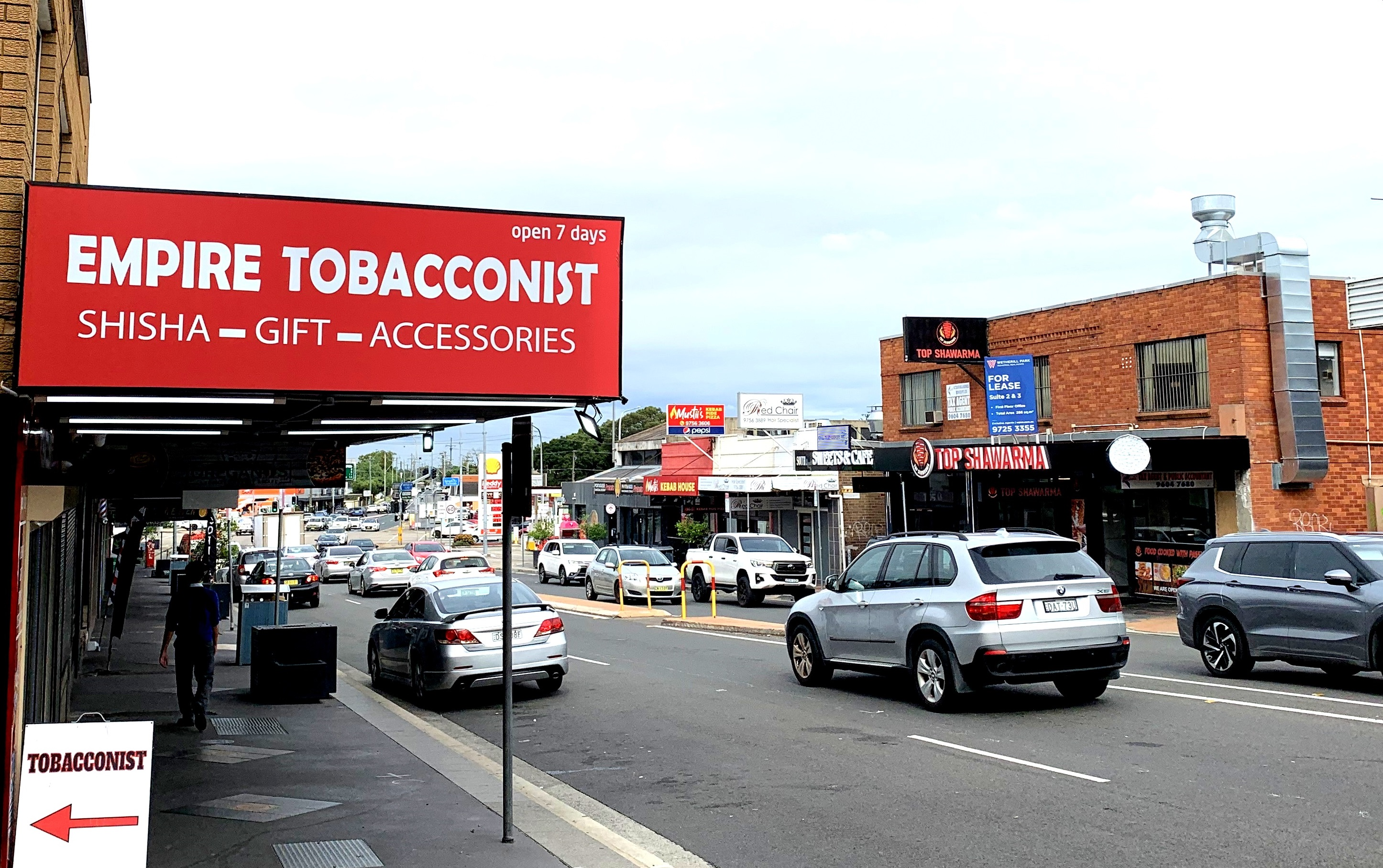
The Horsley Drive, Smithfield's main street

The Horsley Drive and Cumberland Highway (Smithfield Road) are the major road that run through Smithfield, forming the suburb's principal transport corridor and contributing to its predominantly car-oriented character. As a local centre, The Horsley Drive serves as Smithfield's principal retail, commercial and service precinct, while also functioning as the suburb's main arterial route linking it with neighbouring centres. However, the high volume of through traffic contributes to congestion along the corridor. Other major roads include Polding Street, Brennan Street and Victoria Street, with the latter featuring factories. Bus services are operated by Transit Systems. The closest railway stations are Fairfield and Yennora, on the Inner West & Leppington Line and Cumberland Line. Transit Systems buses 806, 808, 812, 813, 814 and 817, which go through the suburb, link to Fairfield railway station, with 806 also linking to Parramatta railway station and Liverpool railway station.

Justin Street and Oxford Street provide lower-traffic north-south corridors linking the town centre with nearby recreational and community facilities. Justin Street connects Brenan Park with the Prospect Creek corridor and the industrial area beyond, while Oxford Street links Smithfield Library and the Youth Centre with the Fairfield City Museum & Gallery and the Prospect Creek corridor. By contrast, the Cumberland Highway corridor, particularly around its intersection with The Horsley Drive, is dominated by vehicle-oriented development, including drive-through businesses, resulting in limited pedestrian amenity and an uninviting streetscape. There is a cycle way called Prospect Creek cycleway that runs through the suburb, which is part of the Western Sydney Regional Park recreational route. The town centre provides time-limited parking, reflecting a strong reliance on private vehicles. Although the Prospect Creek cycleway connects Smithfield with neighbouring suburbs as far as Blacktown, it has limited links to the town centre and is used primarily for recreation rather than everyday commuting. The residential areas are moderately walkable, while the town centre is pedestrian-friendly but has limited pedestrian connections to surrounding parts of the suburb.

Smithfield is characterised by a contrast between the natural landscapes of its parks and Prospect Creek corridor and the heavy vehicle traffic associated with Cumberland Highway (Smithfield Road), the suburb's principal arterial route. The suburb's grid street pattern reflects its origins as the first major settlement in the City of Fairfield. In the absence of a railway station, the town centre is centred on Smithfield Road, a major arterial route, and is characterised by a predominantly car-oriented urban form with limited pedestrian and cycling connectivity. Development is generally coarse-grained, with many commercial and industrial uses set back from the street behind parking areas. Smithfield Road functions as both a major arterial route and a commercial main street, carrying heavy traffic while serving a busy retail precinct. The pedestrian environment is characterised by high traffic volumes, noise and limited shade. By contrast, The Horsley Drive offers a more landscaped streetscape, featuring a planted median, community-designed mosaic planter boxes and roadside greenery, although sections of the footpaths are in need of improvement.

Polding Street provides a direct connection between Fairfield Heights, the Cumberland Highway, Smithfield town centre and Brenan Park. The Horsley Drive links Smithfield with Fairfield City Centre, while west of the Cumberland Highway it provides access to the Wetherill Park industrial precinct and the entrance to Lizard Log in Western Sydney Regional Park. The Boulevarde connects the Fairfield Heights and Smithfield town centres via a pedestrian overpass across the Cumberland Highway, passing St Gertrude's Catholic Primary School.

== Culture ==
The Fairfield City Museum & Gallery was established in 1983 following the acquisition of a 1913 Edwardian-style building that had originally served as the council chambers of the former Smithfield and Fairfield Municipality until 1920. After being occupied as a private residence for several decades, the property was purchased by Fairfield City Council in 1980 following advocacy by the Fairfield Historical Society. The museum has since expanded to include the Stein Gallery and the heritage-themed Vintage Village.

The suburb is also home to the Smithfield RSL Club, which was founded in the early 1950s by Norman McCarthy, who donated the land and provided financial assistance for its construction. McCarthy served as the foundation treasurer of both the Smithfield RSL Sub-Branch and the club, later becoming a trustee and life member in recognition of his contributions. The club was named in honour of his brother, Leo McCarthy, an Australian soldier who served in both World Wars and died as a prisoner of war at Sandakan in 1945. Smithfield was the location for the 7mate show Housos, being one of the many locations for that TV show.

Smithfield Cemetery, established in the 19th century, is situated in the western parts of the suburb, and is currently managed by the Syriac Orthodox Church. The cemetery is a well-preserved historic burial ground containing memorials to migrants, prominent local families and other early residents who contributed to the development of the district. Its grave markers also demonstrate the craftsmanship of monumental masons in suburban Sydney.

=== Places of worship ===
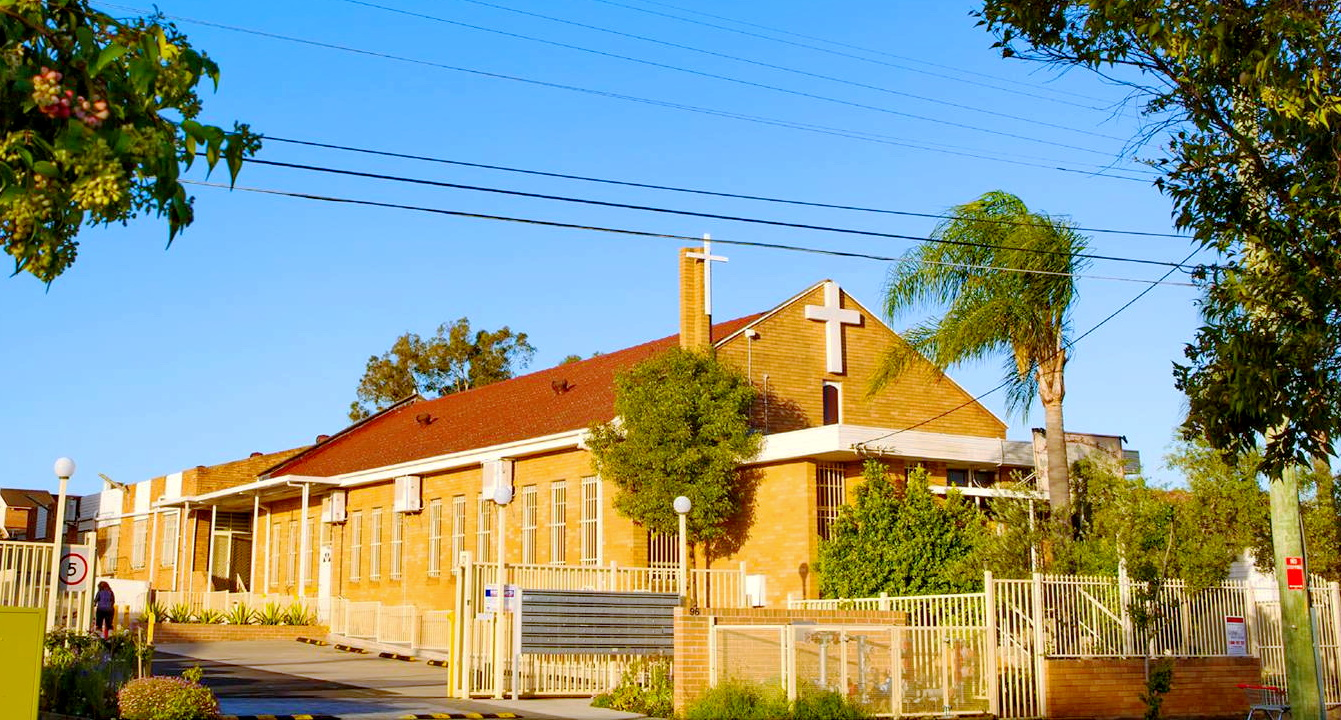
St Mary's Church, an Assyrian place of worship

In the 1880s, the suburb constructed the first Church of England building, the St James Church (1867), a Methodist church (1886) and St Gertrude’s Catholic Church (1884). During the 1880s, with four major churches constructed, Smithfield was the leading religious area in the district. Today, these places of worship are found in the suburb:

- Smithfield Baptist Church is on the corner of The Horsley Drive and O’Connel Street
- St James Anglican church is on the corner of The Horsley Drive and Justin Street
- St Benedicts Catholic Church is located in Justin Street
- Smithfield Uniting Church is on The Horsley Drive
- Minh Giac Temple, a Vietnamese Buddhist temple on the Horsley Drive
- St Mary's Church, an Assyrian church is located in Polding Street
- Smithfield Mosque, (known as the Australian Bosnian Islamic Society Gazi Husrevbeg) is located in Bourke Street.

== Commercial area ==
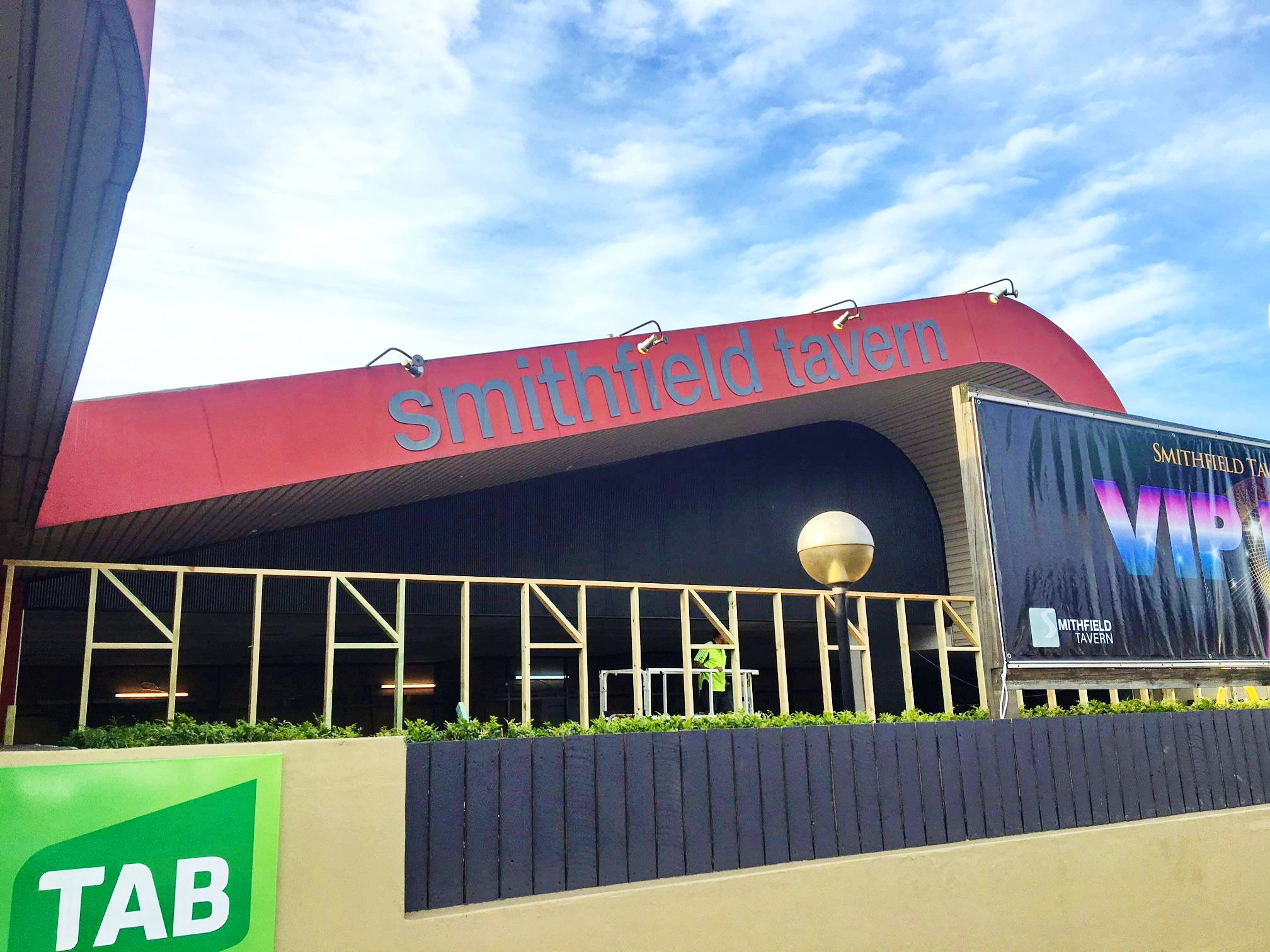
Smithfield Tavern

The commercial area is centred on The Horsley Drive, which is the main street in Smithfield, the most significant east-west road in the region that runs from Carramar and Wetherill Park. The roadway is ornamented by several curtain figs. The suburb's mains street features health services, a gymnasium, beauty and specialty shops, commercial services, multicultural restaurants such as Italian, Middle Eastern and Chinese among others. A prominent pub on The Horsley Drive and Cumberland Highway, with an entryway from Victoria Street as well, called the Smithfield Tavern features a restaurant, a TAB, adult entertainment sessions and concert parties. Also on the road is Smithfield Commercial Centre, an arcade-like building that features businesses and commercial services therein. There is also a small commercial strip in Dublin Street, between Brenan and Jane Streets. The Lebanese restaurant El Jannah is located on Cumberland Highway.

The main road features Smithfield Square, which has been in major redevelopment as of 2025 and occupies the largest land holding in Smithfield CBD. Upon completion, the square will have a net lettable area of 5,500 square metres (59,000 square feet), converting the two-level retail centre into a shopping mall for recreation and services. Lying on the west side of Cumberland Highway and featuring another entry point from Victoria Street, the square will feature a childcare centre, swim school, gym and a medical centre, supported by a range of specialty retail stores. Its 200+ parking space is shared with Smithfield Tavern. The square contained a Coles supermarket in the second level, before it closed in late 2022 as part of the ongoing refurbishment.

Dublin Street, located southwest of the town centre, contains a diverse range of restaurants and food outlets that complement the dining and commercial offerings of the main retail precinct. There is a large industrial area in Smithfield with a number of factories and warehouses. The industrial estate in suburb is the largest in the southern hemisphere and is one of the primary centres for manufacturing and distribution in Greater Western Sydney. The suburb also contains a Bunnings store on its eastern periphery, within the industrial estate.

In 2025, Fairfield City Council approved the Chisholm Place master plan for the Smithfield RSL Club site, bounded by Smithfield Road, Brenan Street and Neville Street. Named after Chisholm's Bush, the former name of Smithfield, the proposed mixed-use redevelopment includes a 168-room hotel, up to 436 apartments in buildings ranging from four to 14 storeys, a medical centre, convenience retail, outdoor event space and recreational parkland, while retaining most existing club facilities and upgrading the club's main entrance and Neville Street frontage. The hotel component remains subject to approval by the NSW Government.

== Education ==
There are local primary schools including Smithfield Public School and Smithfield West Public School. Although there are no local high schools, residents living in the western vicinity of Smithfield are in the area for Westfields Sports High School, and Fairfield High School for those living in the southeastern outskirts of the suburb.

== Politics ==
Smithfield is governed at the local government level by Fairfield City Council, with Frank Carbone (Independent) serving as Mayor. At the state level, the suburb lies within the electoral district of Prospect, represented by Hugh McDermott (Labor). At the federal level, it is divided between the divisions of McMahon and Blaxland, represented by Chris Bowen and Jason Clare (both Labor), respectively. The former electoral district of Smithfield, established in 1988, was represented by the Labor Party until 2011, when it was won by the Liberal Party during Labor's statewide defeat. Following an electoral redistribution, the district was abolished in 2015 and largely replaced by Prospect, which Labor regained at the 2015 election. Prospect has since remained a safe Labor seat, historically recording Labor vote margins around 10 percentage points above the statewide average.

The inaugural member for Smithfield was Janice Crosio, who had previously represented Fairfield and became the first woman to serve in the New South Wales Cabinet. She resigned in 1990 to enter federal politics and was succeeded by Carl Scully, who represented the electorate until 2007 and served as a senior minister in the Carr and Iemma governments. Ninos Khoshaba succeeded Scully in 2007 but lost the seat to Liberal candidate Andrew Rohan at the 2011 election. Following the electorate's abolition and replacement by Prospect in 2015, Rohan was defeated by Labor's Hugh McDermott.

== Demographics ==
According to the 2021 Australian Bureau of Statistics Census of Population, there were 13,160 persons usually resident in Smithfield. The median age of people in Smithfield was 38 years. Smithfield had an unemployment rate of 8.9%.

Ethnic diversity

The most common ancestries in Smithfield were Australian (12.7%), Assyrian (11.4%), English (10.0%), Vietnamese (9.2%) and Iraqi (9.0%). 31.2% of people only spoke English at home. Other languages spoken at home included Arabic (15.3%), Assyrian Neo-Aramaic (10.5%), Vietnamese (9.6%), Chaldean Neo-Aramaic (5.7%) and Spanish (3.2%). Combining the Assyrian and Chaldean Aramaic varieties, Neo-Aramaic will be the most common language other than English, at 16.2%.

Country of birth

Of the people in Smithfield, 42.4% of them were born in Australia. 13.7% of people had both parents born in Australia and 72.9% of people had both parents born overseas. The other common countries of birth were Iraq (18.1%), Vietnam (6.9%), Syria (4.8%), Italy (2.3%) and Lebanon (2.2%).

Religion

Almost three in four residents (68.4%) practice Christianity. The most common responses for religion were Catholic (38.4%), No Religion (10.6%), Islam (9.4%), Buddhism (8.0%) and Assyrian Apostolic (6.8%).

Housing

Separate housing dominates the area, comprising 77.3% of total occupied private dwellings, 10.7% were semi-detached, row or terrace houses, townhouses etc., 10.2% were flat or apartments and 1.5% were other dwellings. 27.3% of the dwellings were owned and 26.4% were owned with a mortgage, and 43.0% were rented. 7.1% had 1 bedroom, 15.2% had 2 bedrooms, 43.7% had 3 bedrooms and 32.0% had 4 or more bedrooms. The average number of bedrooms per occupied private dwelling was 3.1. 51.2% were couple families with children, 24.1% were couple families without children and 22.4% were one parent families, 15.9% of single parents were male and 84.8% were female.

By 2018, Smithfield had experienced substantial increases in house prices and rental costs, reflecting broader housing market trends across Sydney. The suburb's rising property values were associated with increasing gentrification and declining housing affordability, contributing to changes in its traditionally working-class demographic.

== Notable people ==
- Harry Kewell, socceroos footballer
- Chris Bowen, politician

== Gallery ==
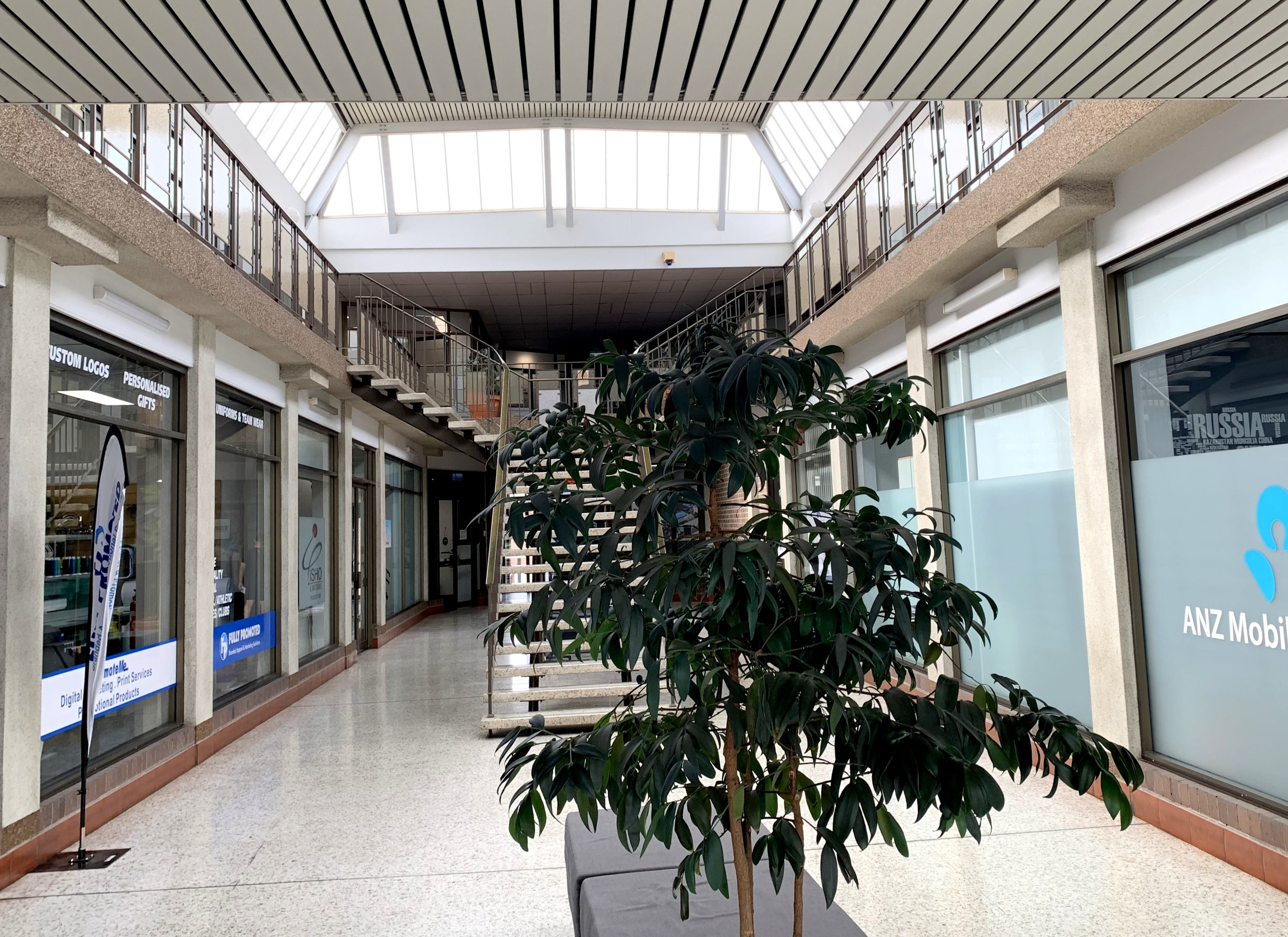
Smithfield Commercial Centre, a galleria-like business hub

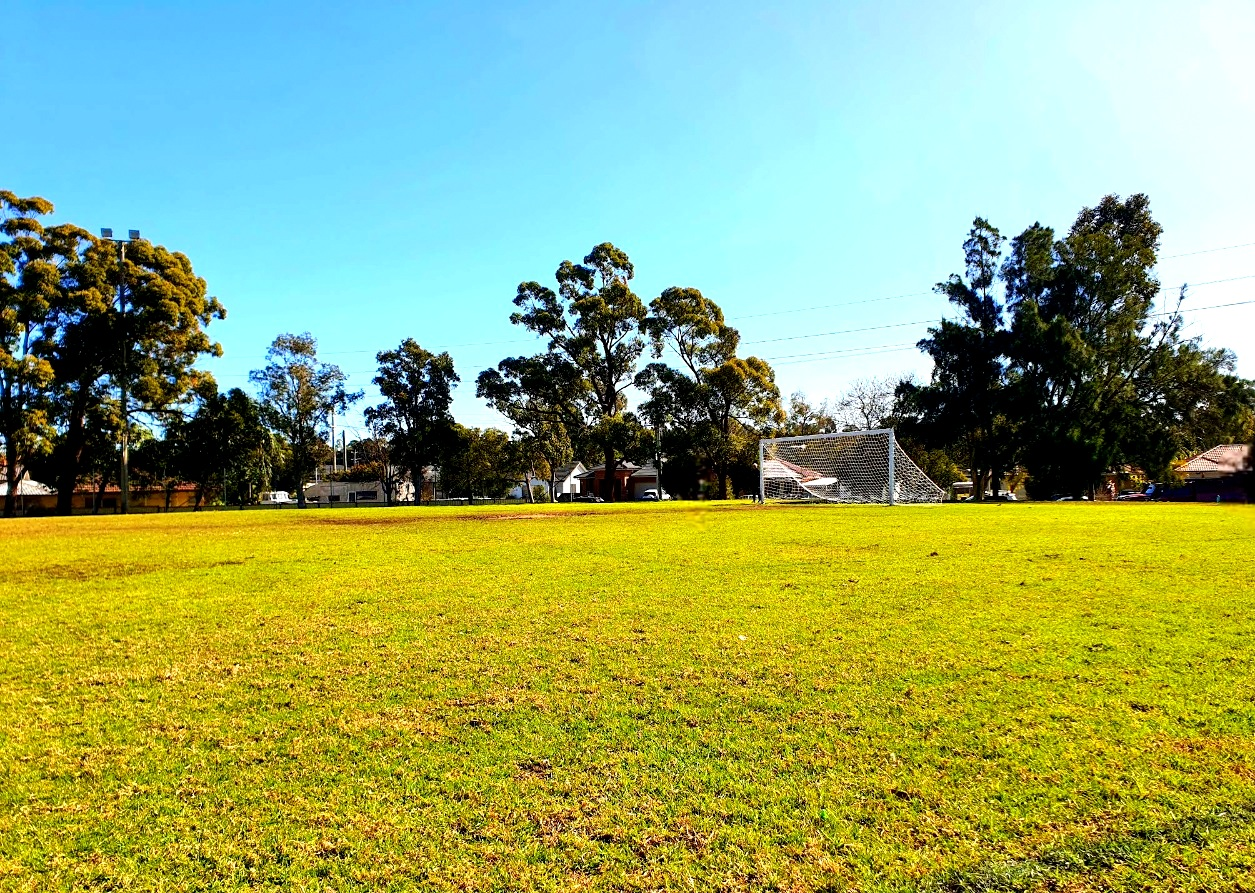
Prospect View Park

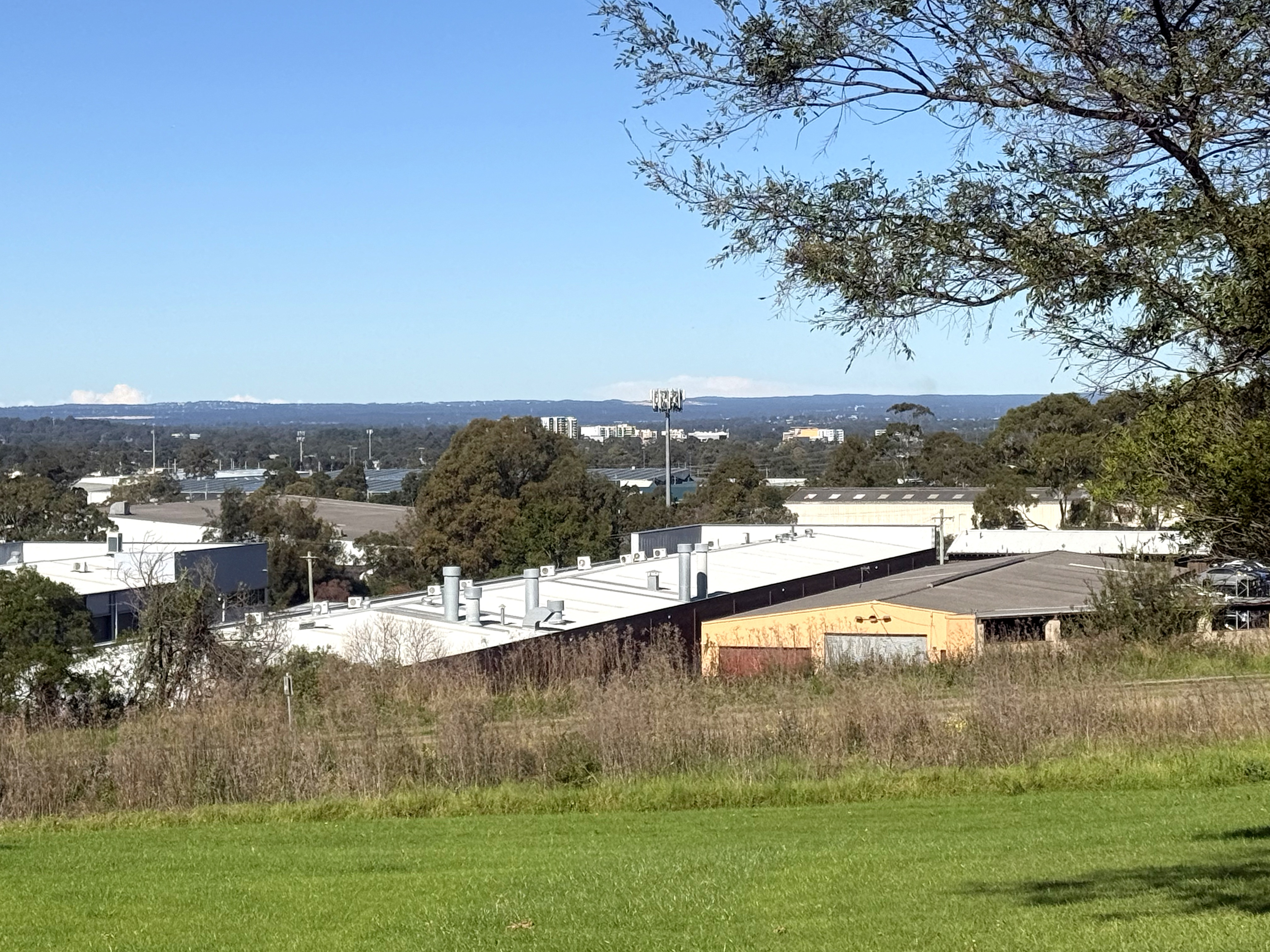
Smithfield's industrial area, viewed from Greystanes, with the Fairfield CBD in the background.

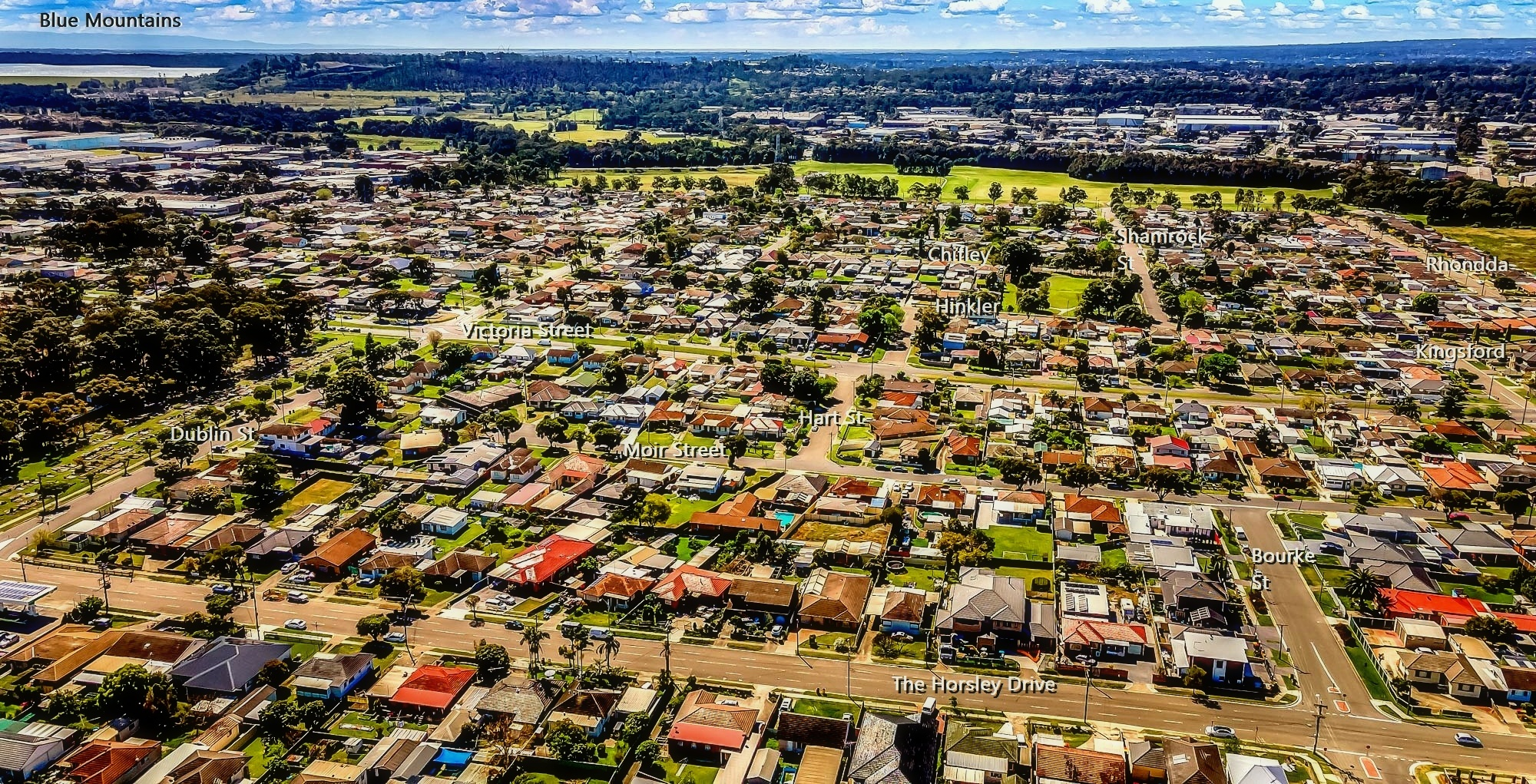
The Smithfield West suburban area, with Rosford Park at the top, The Horsley Drive at the bottom, and Smithfield Cemetery on the left.
