= Smithfield West =

- Suburb
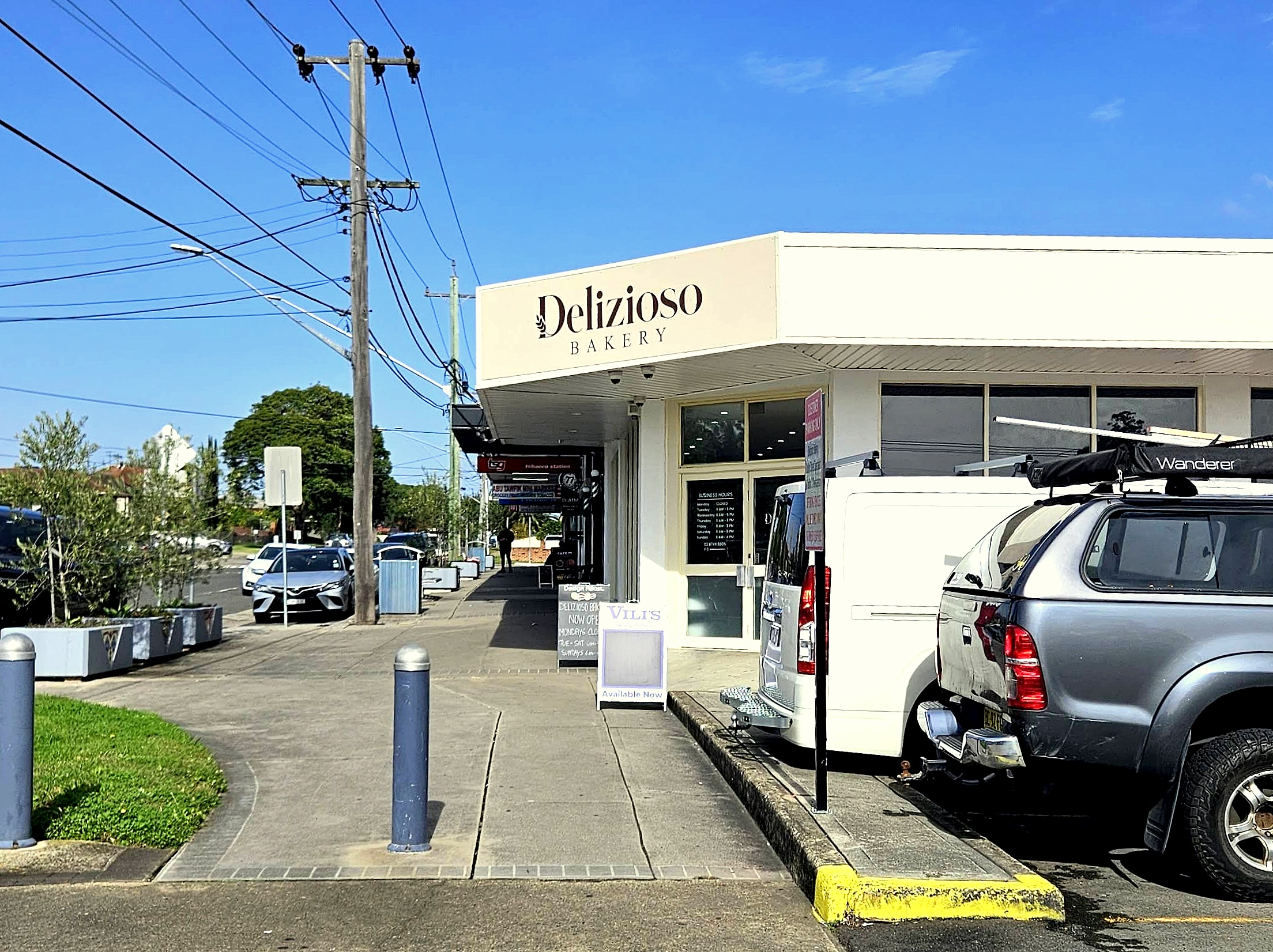
- Dublin Street storefronts

- Coordinates: 33°51′06″S 150°55′27″E
- Country: Australia
- State: New South Wales
- City: Smithfield
- LGA: City of Fairfield
- Location: 32 km (20 mi) west of Sydney CBD
- Elevation: 26–45 m (85–148 ft)

Population
  - Total: 19,510 (est.) (2021)
Suburbs around Smithfield West
Wetherill Park	Smithfield	Smithfield
Wetherill Park	Smithfield West	Smithfield
Prairiewood	Fairfield West	Fairfield West

Smithfield West is a locality situated in the local government area of the City of Fairfield in Greater Western Sydney, New South Wales, Australia. Part of Smithfield, Smithfield West is an unofficial designation for the neighbourhood area that generally lies west of Brenan Park, (Note: Bourke Street runs along the park's western side, marking the boundary. Market Street may also be considered Smithfield West's eastern boundary at its broadest extent.) extending to Wetherill Street on the boundary with Wetherill Park. The locality is predominantly a residential area containing both public and private housing. The area shares Smithfield's postcode, 2164.

Smithfield West is an established geographical and postal designation within Smithfield, although it is not a separately gazetted suburb or locality of New South Wales. The name has been used in postal and government administrative records for decades, including by Australia Post, the NSW Government and the Australian Electoral Commission. Fairfield City Council also uses Smithfield West as the name of a defined flood-study and planning area. The locality lies in the Electoral district of Prospect and the Division of McMahon, as with Smithfield.

== History ==
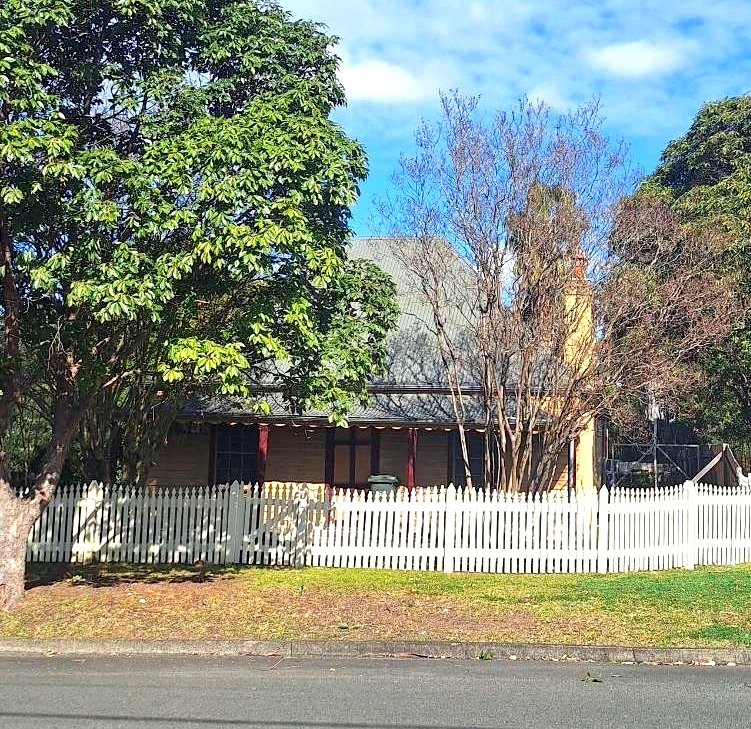
Coleman house, a slab hut, built c. 1880

The Smithfield West area was originally inhabited by the Cabrogal people for more than 30,000 years. European settlement began in the early 19th century, with the area being subdivided during the 1830s. In 1867, Smithfield was a semi-rural settlement populated by vine growers, gardeners, wood timber cutters, orchards and tanneries. Some of the best farming land at that time was in the district to the west and southwest of the Smithfield area, which includes the locality of Smithfield West. Now a heritage item, the Coleman Home was built in 1880 on the corner of Chifley and Shamrock streets and is the oldest surviving slab hut in the City of Fairfield.

The name 'Smithfield' reflects its association with the major cattle markets of London and Dublin. The locality's principal north–south road, Dublin Street, was named after the Dublin cattle market. In 1924, the Sydney and Suburban Blue Metal Quarries constructed the Widemere Quarry Line to connect the Booth mine at Prospect Hill with Fairfield railway station. The railway passed through what is now The Horsley Drive (then Smithfield Street) and Dublin Street, before closing in 1945. A post office known as Smithfield West was established in 1959 at 50 Dublin Street, opening on 2 March with money order facilities. It remained in operation for several decades before closing. The Fairfield Motor Cycle Club formed in 1935 and it was provided a circuit track in Dublin Street, before closing down in the 1960s.

The former Dublin Street Bridge over Prospect Creek was located at the northern end of Dublin Street, where the road formerly continued as Gipps Road. The bridge provided an important connection between the Fairfield City Council and Holroyd City Council areas and linked Smithfield with the Great Western Highway. In 1957, following earlier damage caused by fire, the bridge was almost completely destroyed when a lorry carrying metal crashed through it, resulting in the closure of the crossing. The modern crossing remains in use as the Gipps Road Bridge over Prospect Creek, although the surrounding road layout has changed substantially since 1957 following the establishment of Rosford Park. There was also George Street, which ran east–west through what is now Rosford Park and intersected with Dublin Street, which formerly extended north through the area now occupied by the park. Both streets were removed following the establishment of the park in the early 1980s. Eyre Street was formerly known as John Street until the mid-20th century.

In 2010, a proposal to establish a new locality named Brenan Heights, encompassing Brenan Park and the entirety of Smithfield West, was put to residents and property owners in a ballot. The proposal failed to receive sufficient community support.

== Geography ==
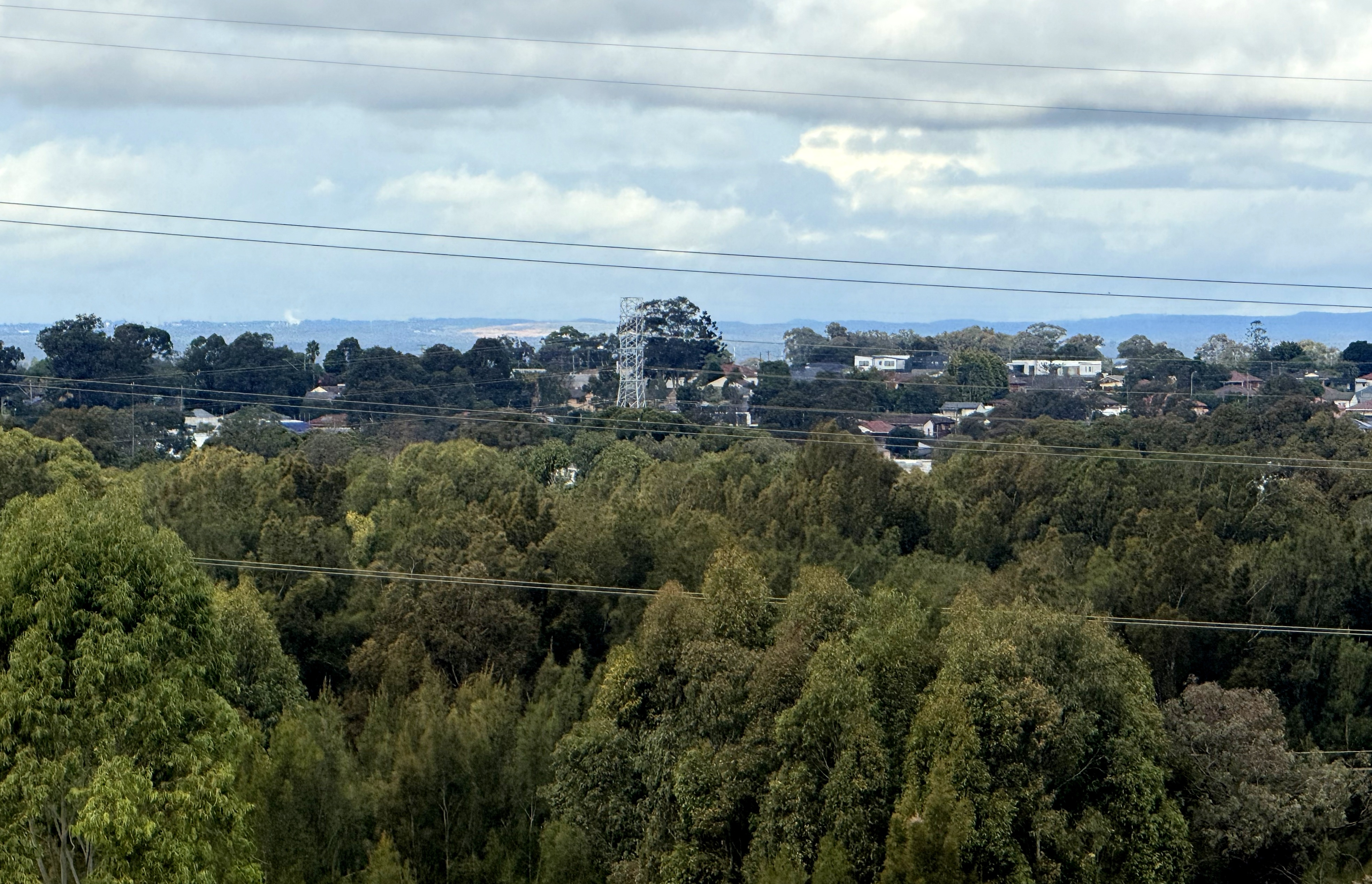
View of the locality from Pemulwuy

The Horsley Drive is the major road which runs through the locality. Other major roads include Polding Street, Hassall Street and Victoria Street, with the latter featuring factories. In the southwest, just south of The Horsley Drive, Wetherill Street forms the main boundary between Smithfield West and Wetherill Park. The distinction between the two areas is also reflected in the age of their housing, with properties on the Wetherill Park side generally dating from the 1980s onwards, while much of the housing in Smithfield West to the east generally predates the 1980s. In the north-west, Hassall Street forms part of the western boundary of Smithfield West with Wetherill Park. Market Street runs roughly north–south and generally forms the eastern boundary of Smithfield West, separating the area from the remainder of Smithfield to the east. In the strictest interpretation, however, Bourke Street forms the eastern boundary, while Rhondda Street, opposite the industrial area and riparian zone, forms the boundary in the northeast.

Rosford Park is a parkland in the northern skirts of the locality which features a large sports grounds and an urban forest. Other parks and reserves include, Kilkenny Avenue Reserve, Shamrock Park, Clarrie Atkins Park, Beaumont Park and Mirkwood Reserve, which lies within the Prospect Creek riparian corridor. There is a cycle way called Prospect Creek cycleway that runs through the northern periphery of the locality. The Horsley Drive links the area with Fairfield City Centre. Dublin Street has the highest recorded street-tree canopy cover in the locality, with approximately 5,276.5 m² of canopy.

=== Flooding and drainage ===
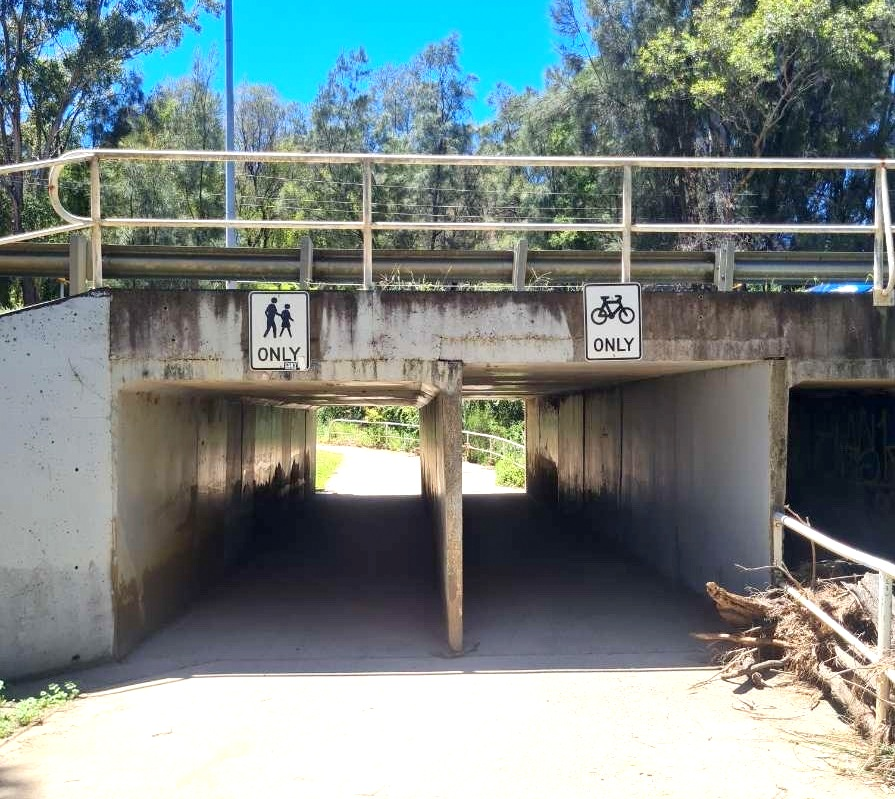
Gipps Road Bridge underpass, an area prone to flooding, forming part of the boundary between the locality and Greystanes to the north and the boundary between the Fairfield and Cumberland LGA.

Smithfield West forms a subcatchment of the wider Prospect Creek catchment, with Prospect Creek forming the downstream boundary of the area. Flooding in Prospect Creek can therefore cause inundation along the downstream edge of the Smithfield West catchment. Concurrent flooding in Prospect Creek and the Smithfield West subcatchment may also reduce the capacity of the local drainage system to discharge runoff, making flooding from Prospect Creek an important consideration in the catchment. The Smithfield West catchment covers approximately 152 hectares within the City of Fairfield and includes most of Smithfield, as well as parts of Prairiewood and Fairfield West.

The catchment is highly urbanised, consisting predominantly of low-density residential development, with some industrial properties around Market Street. Stormwater is conveyed through a drainage network in a north-easterly direction towards Prospect Creek. Flooding in the Smithfield West catchment is generally associated with short-duration, intense rainfall events that provide little warning. Consequently, there is limited opportunity for residents and businesses to take measures to reduce damage, and no adjustment was made to account for differences between potential and actual flood damages. During periods of heavy rainfall, the capacity of the stormwater system can be exceeded, resulting in overland flows and potential inundation of properties. Flooding has occurred in the catchment on several occasions, including in 1990 and 2012.

As urban development advanced in the area, many of the gullies and waterways that formerly conveyed runoff into Prospect Creek were replaced by stormwater pipes. One such system is the "Rosford Channel", which originates from Victoria Street on the locality's western outskirts in Wetherill Park and runs northeast towards the northeastern edge of Rosford Park, via Gipps Road, before discharging into Prospect Creek. The main stormwater drainage line runs beneath Cartela Crescent, Canara Place, Dublin Street and The Horsley Drive before discharging into Prospect Creek. Rosford Park also functions as a flood detention basin, which is designed to temporarily store stormwater during major rainfall events, thereby reducing the risk of flooding in downstream streets and properties.

During the February 2012 flood, peak water levels in Smithfield West were broadly comparable to those recorded during the 1990 flood around Hart Street, Moir Street and downstream of Victoria Street. However, near Hinkler Street, the 2012 flood reached peak levels approximately 0.4 metres lower than those recorded in 1990. For the 1% AEP flood event, storm durations of 1.5 and 2 hours produce the highest flood levels across most of the catchment. The 1.5-hour duration generally dominates areas of shallow flow, while the 2-hour duration produces the highest levels along the main diagonal overland flow path.

== Facilities ==
Smithfield West Public School, which includes a preschool, is located on Wetherill Street, bordering Wetherill Park. Rosford Park is an important sporting venue for the area and is home to several community sporting clubs, including Smithfield Athletics. The park also has a longstanding rugby connection, including The Smithfield Warthogs Rugby Club and the CH Dragons RLFC. Smithfield Fire Station is also situated in the locality, on The Horsley Drive.

The area also has convenient access to essential services, with 46 schools within a 5 km radius, an average ICSEA (Index of Community Socio-Educational Advantage) score of 959, and a hospital located approximately 1.4 km away. Opened in 2000, the Australia Post Smithfield West LPO serves the Smithfield West area despite being physically located in Wetherill Park. The name reflects its role in serving the Smithfield West area, rather than its location within the locality. Bus services are operated by Transit Systems. Bus route 808, which goes through the locality links to Fairfield railway station, Abbotsbury and Liverpool railway station.

=== Commercial area ===
The locality of Smithfield West has small clusters of restaurants and local businesses along Dublin Street near Brenan Street and along Hassall Street. These have included Chinese restaurants, a prominent Italian restaurant, a fish and chips shop, a delicatessen, a pharmacy, a doctor's office, a bakery, a newsagent's shop and several convenience stores. Dublin Street contains a diverse range of restaurants and food outlets that complement the dining and commercial offerings of the main retail precinct. There is also a Telstra payphone on Dublin Street, proximate to the storefronts. There is a large industrial area nearby with a number of factories and warehouses. The industrial estate in the locality is the largest in the Southern Hemisphere and is one of the primary centres for manufacturing and distribution in Greater Western Sydney. The local economy is relatively diverse, with no single employer or industry dominating the area.

In April 2026, Prime Minister Anthony Albanese made a surprise visit to Delizioso Bakery in the area, where he stopped for coffee, spoke with staff and customers. The visit took place shortly before Easter and was reported as a notable local event for the business and community.

=== Culture ===
Smithfield Cemetery is situated in this locality, on Dublin Street, corner of Victoria Road. Established in the 19th century, the cemetery is currently managed by the Syriac Orthodox Church and is a well-preserved historic burial ground containing memorials to migrants, prominent local families and other early residents who contributed to the development of the district. Its grave markers also demonstrate the craftsmanship of monumental masons in suburban Sydney. The Smithfield Mosque, also known as the Gazi Husrev-beg Mosque, is the only place of worship currently located within Smithfield West. It serves the local Bosnian Muslim community and provides regular Islamic prayer services, with religious services conducted in Bosnian and English.

== Demographics ==
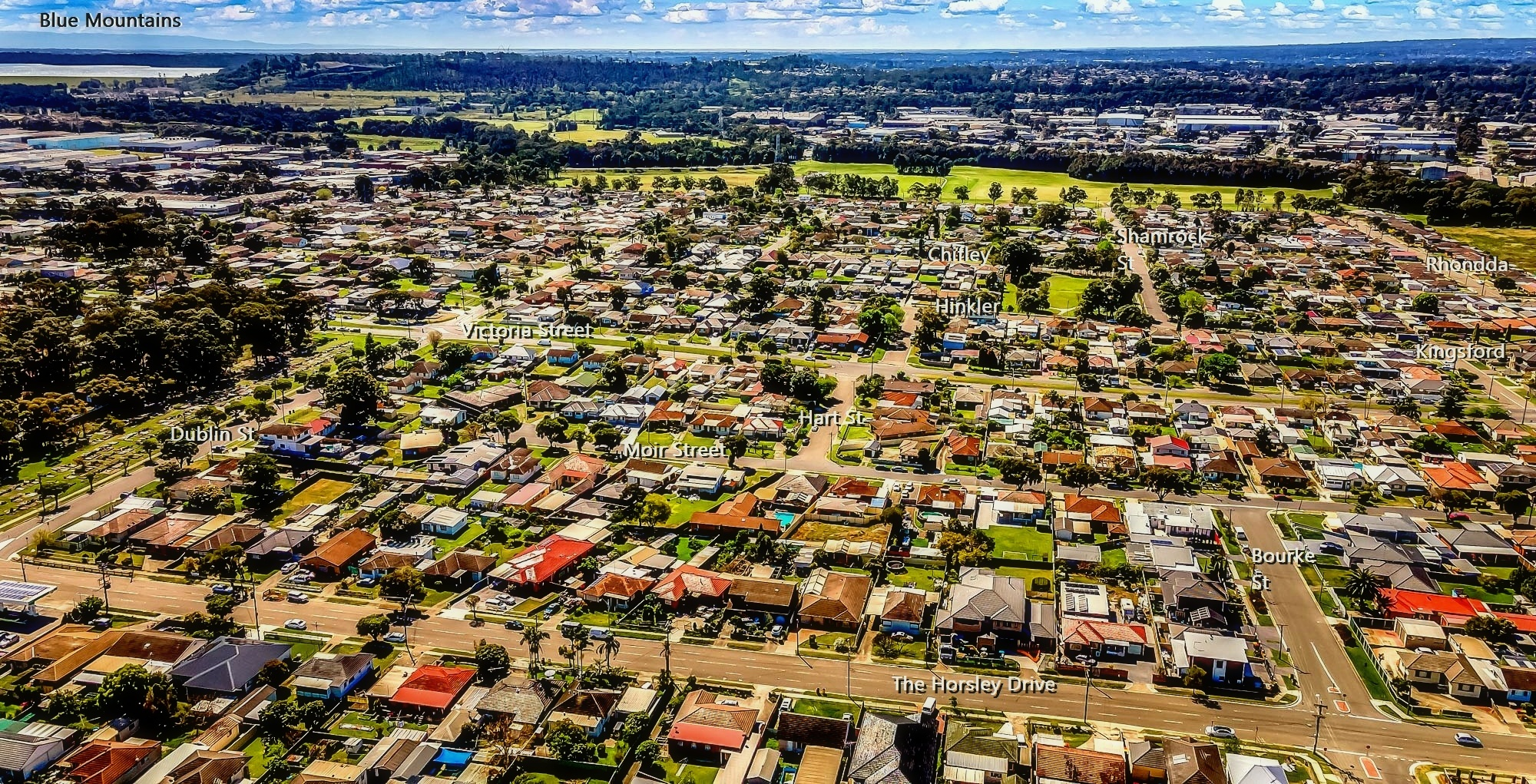
The Smithfield West suburban area

In 2021, Smithfield West had 19,510 residents, with 36.3% aged 35–64, 25.9% aged 15–34, 19.2% under 15 and 18.5% aged 65 or over. The area had a predominantly separate-house dwelling pattern, with 91.5% of dwellings being detached houses, while semi-detached dwellings and apartments accounted for 6.9% and 1.4%, respectively. The area's largest employment industries included health care and social assistance, retail trade, manufacturing and construction. Moreover, the professional workforce in Smithfield West has grown in line with broader state trends. While specific figures for the suburb are not provided, the proportion of professionals among employed workers across the state increased by 9.5% between 2016 and 2021, reaching 25.8% in 2021. This broader shift towards professional employment may also be reflected in the locality's workforce.

Despite its name, Fairfield West Caravan Park is located within the locality of Smithfield West, on Polding Street. The long-term residential caravan park occupies a relatively concealed site accessed by a narrow driveway beside 7-Eleven. It primarily accommodates permanent residents, with the park reported in 2021 to have around 120 residents and 98 caravans. The park has provided a relatively affordable form of long-term housing in Western Sydney, including accommodation for pensioners, workers and people who have experienced difficulty securing conventional rental housing. The caravan park is notable for its long-term residential character, rather than functioning primarily as a short-stay holiday park. Its current operator advertises minimum stays of two months and no overnight stays, while describing the park as providing permanent accommodation.

Chris Bowen, Minister for Climate Change and Energy and Federal Member for McMahon, grew up in Smithfield West and has continued to live in the area.
