= Wetherill Park =

- Suburb
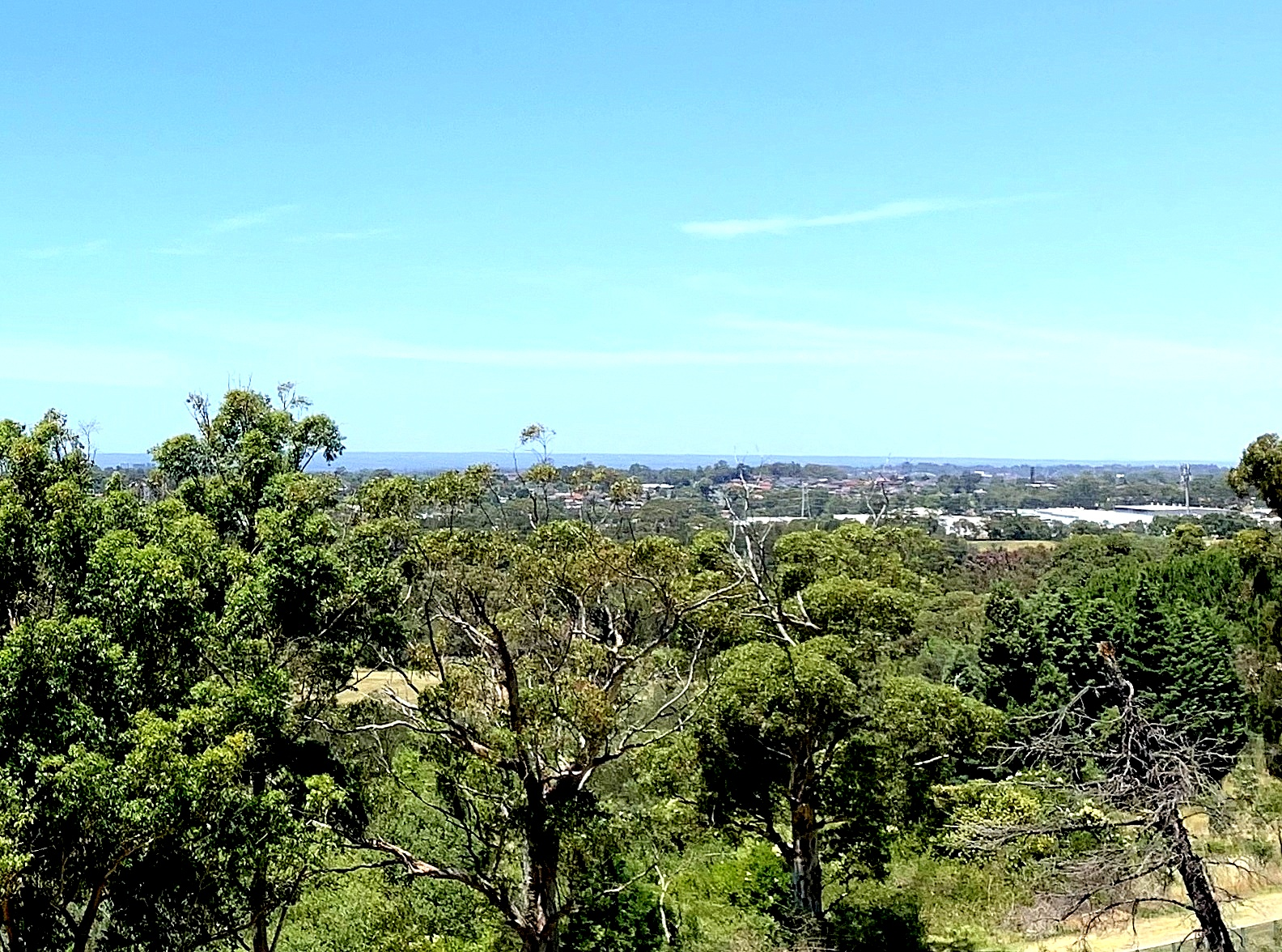
- The residential and industrial zone of Wetherill Park, as viewed from Pemulwuy

- Interactive map of Wetherill Park
- Coordinates: 33°50′59″S 150°54′40″E
- Country: Australia
- State: New South Wales
- City: Greater Western Sydney
- LGA: City of Fairfield
- Location: 34 km (21 mi) west of Sydney CBD

Government
  - State electorate: Prospect
  - Federal divisions: McMahon; Fowler

Area
  - Total: 11.2 km^{2} (4.3 sq mi)
- Elevation: 44 m (144 ft)

Population
  - Total: 6,412 (2021 census)
  - Density: 572.5/km^{2} (1,483/sq mi)
- Postcode: 2164
Suburbs around Wetherill Park
Prospect	Pemulwuy	Greystanes
Horsley Park	Wetherill Park	Smithfield West/Smithfield
Abbotsbury	Bossley Park	Prairiewood

Wetherill Park is a suburb in Greater Western Sydney, in the state of New South Wales, Australia. Wetherill Park is located 34 kilometres west of the Sydney central business district, in the local government area of the City of Fairfield. The area is 11.2 km^{2}. Most residents live in the south-east corner, the larger portion of the suburb being an industrial area.

Wetherill Park sits on the southern border of Prospect Reservoir. Located partially in the suburb, the Smithfield-Wetherill Park Industrial Estate is the largest industrial estate in the southern hemisphere and is the centre of manufacturing and distribution in Greater Western Sydney. Despite its large industry area, Wetherill Park is listed as one of the five most leafiest suburbs in Sydney by the Domain Group (the only suburb in Western Sydney to be listed).

== History ==
=== Aboriginal culture ===
Aboriginal people from the Cabrogal clan of the Gandangara tribe, have allegedly lived in the area for more than 30,000 years.

=== European settlement ===
Wetherill Park was named after a businessman who offered 21 acres (85,000 m^{2}) of his property to the State government as a park. The offer was accepted and the park was named after the donor. The first settlers in set up their homes north of the present school site at Wetherill Park. One hundred years ago, there were not enough homes in this suburb to need a school.

With the commencement of the Prospect Reservoir Waterworks, a local storekeeper, Samuel Booth, made available a section of his land for a school, free of charge. The school, called 'Macquarie Park', was located on the corner of Victoria and Daniel Streets being 365 Victoria Street, Wetheril Park. It opened in May 1882 with eight children but the name was changed in June 1882 to 'Boothtown' in recognition of Samuel Booth's involvement in the establishment of the school. In 1884 it became Reservoir Public School and in 1896, it became the Wetherill Park Public School. In 1986 the school made way for the Phuoc Hue Temple, and was relocated down the road to Lily Street and renamed William Stimson Public School, in honour of the first mayor of the City of Fairfield.

== Street names ==
A characteristic of Wetherill Park is that all the streets are named after famous writers. Some examples include: Vidal Street (for Gore Vidal), Shakespeare Street (for William Shakespeare), Stevenson Street (for Robert Louis Stevenson), Locke Street (for John Locke), Gogol Place (for Nikolai Gogol), Swinburne Crescent (for Richard Swinburne), Homer Place (for Homer), Emerson Street (for Ralph Waldo Emerson), Wordsworth Street (for William Wordsworth), Dickens Road (for Charles Dickens), Longfellow Street (for Henry Wadsworth Longfellow), Chaucer Street (for Geoffrey Chaucer), Ainsworth Crescent (for William Harrison Ainsworth), Coleridge Road (for Samuel Taylor Coleridge), Frost Close (for Robert Frost), Gissing Street (for George Gissing), Maugham Crescent (for Somerset Maugham) and Langland Street (for William Langland).

== Commercial areas ==
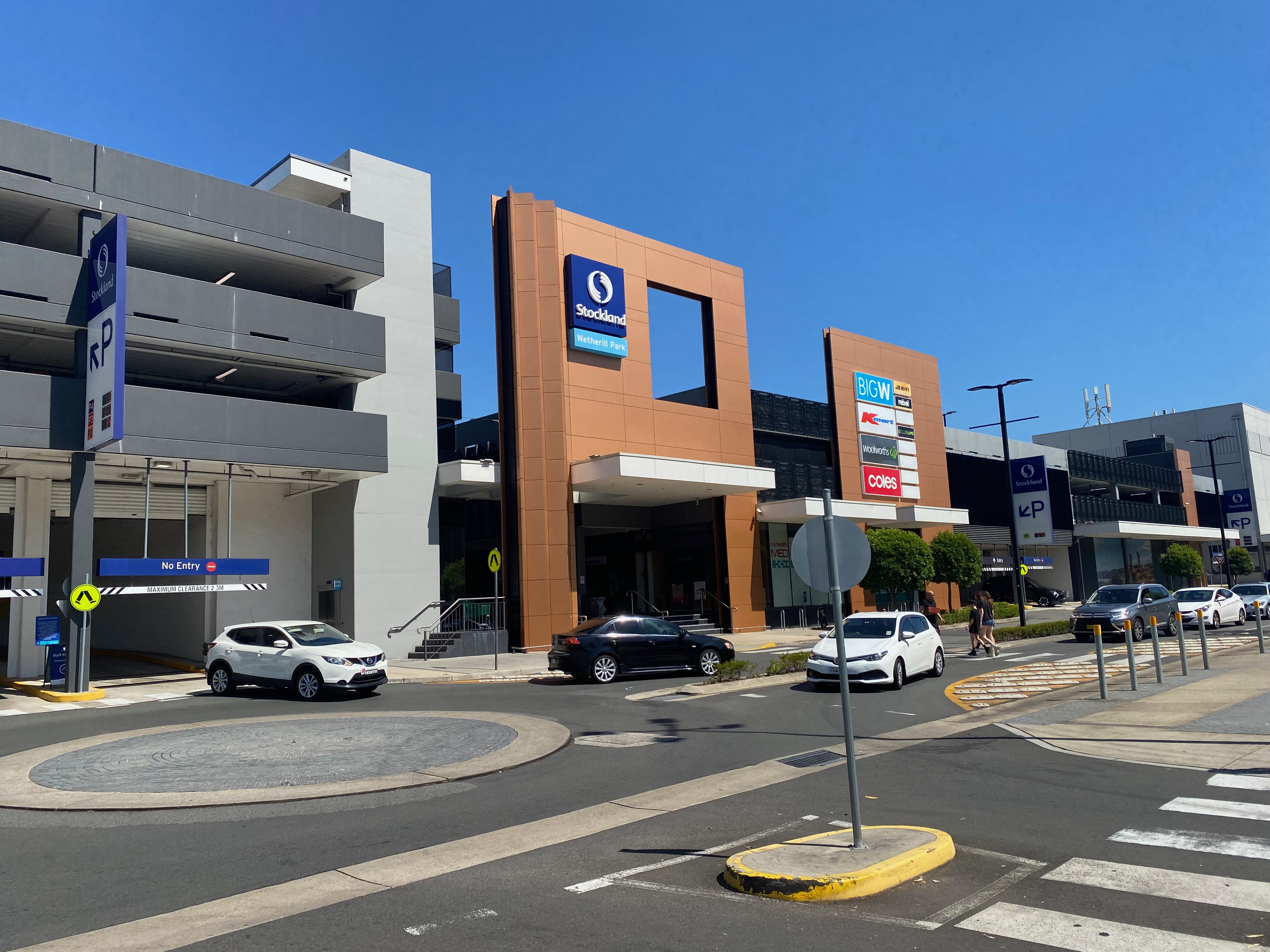
Stockland Shopping Centre

- Stockland Wetherill Park is a major shopping centre in the area and features one of Australia's largest cinema complexes owned by Hoyts. The shopping centre opened in 1983, the first major expansion took place in 2003.

In 2013, a second expansion saw the building complex expand to fill the entire lot, with parking moved underground and multi-storey rooftop parking. The 2013 expansion cost over $200 million AUD and was complete in 2016. A large stand-alone Chinese restaurant existed on the lot until the early 2000s. It hosted Chinese diplomats and VIPs as well as lavish Chinese New Year functions until the location was purchased by the Local Government and turned into the Wetherill Park Library.

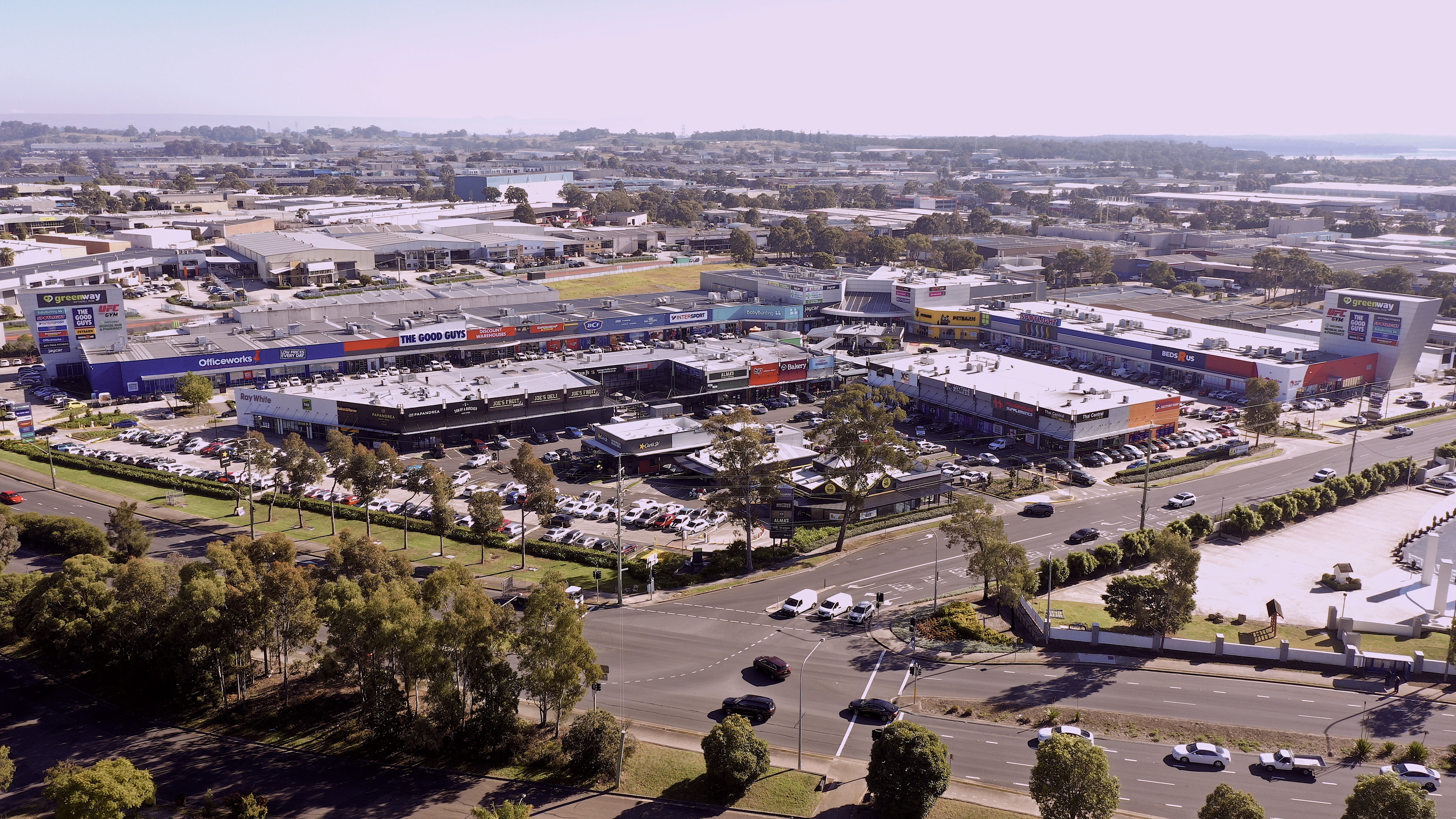
Greenway Wetherill Park

- Greenway Wetherill Park (formerly Greenway Plaza and Homemaker Greenway) is an open-air shopping centre in Wetherill Park, New South Wales. The centre features a combination of large-format retailers, specialty stores, food outlets and service providers, serving both the local residential population and the broader Western Sydney region. Located on The Horsley Drive, the centre forms part of one of Sydney's largest industrial and commercial precincts.
- Wetherill Park Shopping Centre (now known as Market Town) opened in the early 1980s on the corner of The Horsley Drive and Rossetti Street, adjacent to Emerson Street Reserve tennis courts. It originally featured approximately 25 specialty shops. In recent years, the shopping centre underwent renovations which saw the shopping complex completely reformed and the rear parking lot expanded. Today, the complex also features a bowling centre and supermarkets.

=== Industrial area ===
Wetherill Park is home to the largest industrial estate in the Southern Hemisphere, with companies such as Jaguar, BMW, Subaru and Mercedes-Benz situated in the area. Despite the heavy industrial presence, the suburb maintains a coppice environment dominated by eucalyptus trees. Within the industrial estate, there are furniture stores, home depot stores, car mechanic services and clothing factories, among others.

The headquarters of the Australian paper manufacturer ABC Tissue Products (which operates tissue paper brands such as, Quilton, Naturale and Symphony, among others) is situated in Redfern Street.

== Transport ==
T-way bus route T80 operated by Transit Systems, opened in 2003 and runs partly through Wetherill Park. It is also located close to the Westlink M7 Sydney Orbital motorway. The Horsley Drive is the major road which runs through Wetherill Park. Other major roads include Polding Street and Victoria Street.

== Climate ==
Wetherill Park has a humid subtropical climate (Cfa) with warm to hot summers and cool, drier winters. Frost is not unheard of in winter. Afternoon thunderstorms can occur in the warm months.

The hottest streets in the Fairfield City area were all located in the suburb. Metters Place recorded the highest average temperature at 11.16°C (52.09°F), followed by Walker Place and Hexham Place, which each recorded an average of 10.34°C (50.61°F). This can be attributed to the prevalence of modified land surfaces within the area, particularly in higher-density residential areas and the Smithfield–Wetherill Park industrial area.

Climate data for Prospect Reservoir 1991–2020 averages, 1887–present extremes^{[note a]}
Month	Jan	Feb	Mar	Apr	May	Jun	Jul	Aug	Sep	Oct	Nov	Dec	Year
Record high °C (°F)	47.0 (116.6)	46.4 (115.5)	39.5 (103.1)	37.1 (98.8)	29.4 (84.9)	25.6 (78.1)	26.5 (79.7)	29.4 (84.9)	35.0 (95.0)	39.0 (102.2)	42.0 (107.6)	44.4 (111.9)	47.0 (116.6)
Mean daily maximum °C (°F)	29.3 (84.7)	28.6 (83.5)	26.8 (80.2)	24.1 (75.4)	20.7 (69.3)	17.7 (63.9)	17.2 (63.0)	19.3 (66.7)	22.4 (72.3)	24.8 (76.6)	26.1 (79.0)	28.0 (82.4)	23.8 (74.8)
Mean daily minimum °C (°F)	18.0 (64.4)	18.0 (64.4)	16.2 (61.2)	12.9 (55.2)	9.7 (49.5)	6.1 (43.0)	6.6 (43.9)	6.6 (43.9)	9.5 (49.1)	12.1 (53.8)	14.5 (58.1)	16.4 (61.5)	12.3 (54.1)
Record low °C (°F)	10.0 (50.0)	10.8 (51.4)	7.9 (46.2)	3.6 (38.5)	1.2 (34.2)	−0.8 (30.6)	−0.6 (30.9)	−0.5 (31.1)	1.7 (35.1)	4.5 (40.1)	6.8 (44.2)	7.8 (46.0)	−0.8 (30.6)
Average precipitation mm (inches)	96.4 (3.80)	126.9 (5.00)	97.4 (3.83)	67.4 (2.65)	49.5 (1.95)	76.1 (3.00)	40.7 (1.60)	39.7 (1.56)	42.2 (1.66)	55.3 (2.18)	77.1 (3.04)	75.5 (2.97)	845.0 (33.27)
Average precipitation days (≥ 1mm)	8.3	8.7	9.2	6.5	5.3	7.0	5.6	4.2	5.1	6.6	8.2	8.2	82.9
Average afternoon relative humidity (%)	52	54	55	50	57	54	52	43	45	44	51	51	51
Source 1: Prospect Reservoir (1991–2020 averages)
Source 2: Prospect Reservoir (1965–2018 extremes) Horsley Park (1997–present extremes)

^[note a]: The closest weather station is located within Prospect Reservoir on the Prospect–Wetherill Park border (in the northern outskirts of the suburb).

== Demographics ==
According to the 2021 Census, the most common ancestries in Wetherill Park were Australian 11.0%, Assyrian 10.7%, Italian 9.4%, English 8.7%, and Iraqi 7.4%.

43.2% of people were born in Australia. The most common countries of birth were Iraq 18.0%, Vietnam 3.2%, Italy 3.0%, Syria 2.4% and Croatia 1.6%.

The most common responses for religion were Catholic 46.4%, No Religion 10.1%, Not stated 6.2%, Assyrian Church of the East 6.1%, Islam 7.0% and Eastern Orthodox 6.1%. Overall, Christianity was the largest religious group reported (74.0%).

32.8% of people only spoke English at home. Other languages spoken at home included Arabic 12.4%, Assyrian Neo-Aramaic 9.5%, Chaldean Neo-Aramaic 6.3%, Spanish 5.0% and Vietnamese 3.9%. Combining the varieties of Assyrian and Chaldean, Neo-Aramaic will be the most common language at 15.8%.

== Schools ==
- William Stimson Public School

== Parks and recreation ==
The suburb features a large recreational park and an urban forest, Wetherill Park Nature Reserve. Adjacent to that Reserve is the Emerson Street Reserve, which is a 6-hectare, rectangular-shaped sports ground which features a walking track, a tennis facility, a skate park, a basketball court, cricket practice nets and a soccer field. Nineveh Reserve is a passive recreation park situated between the Liverpool–Parramatta T-way and Cobbet Street. Although not in the suburb, Rosford Street Reserve is adjacent to the eastern outskirts of Wetherill Park.

As part of Fairfield City Council's Parks Improvement Program, Shakespeare Park was upgraded in 2006.

== Places of worship ==
Wetherill Park is home to a large Vietnamese Buddhist temple, Phuoc Hue Temple, which was visited by Prince Charles in 1994.

== Notable residents ==
Wetherill Park was once home to Italian footballer, Christian Vieri.
