= Brenan Park =

Urban park in Sydney, Australia

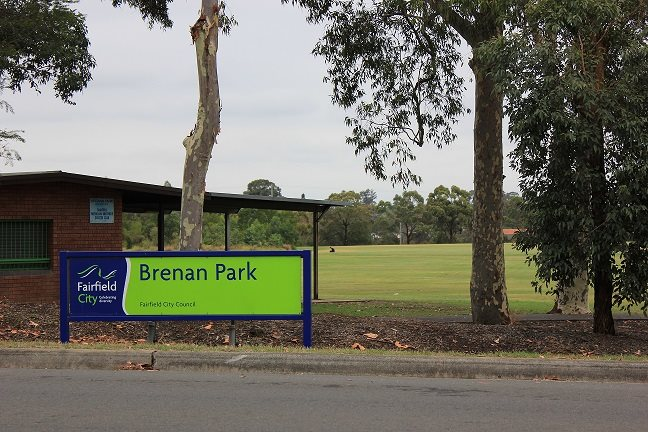
- Brenan Park entrance sign
- Interactive map of Brenan Park
- Type: Urban park, sports ground, nature reserve
- Location: Smithfield, Western suburbs of Sydney, New South Wales, Australia
- Coordinates: 33°51′29″S 150°55′48″E
- Area: 20 hectares (49 acres)
- Opened: 1981
- Etymology: John Ryan Brenan
- Operator: Fairfield City Council
- Open: 24 hours
- Status: Open all year

Brenan Park is a 20-hectare (49-acre) urban park situated in the western suburbs of Sydney, New South Wales, Australia. Primarily categorised as a sports field, the reserve contains an open grassland, bushland and recreational areas within the vicinity of native plants, such as eucalyptus trees. It is named after John Ryan Brenan, who founded the suburb of Smithfield in 1836.

Artificially terraced, Brenan Park was established in the early 1980s and it is one of the largest reserves in the City of Fairfield, and one of the largest non-golf course green spaces in the Western Sydney region.

== History ==
The shape of Brenan Park appears on the first survey design, in 1838, of the market town sketched for John Ryan Brenan. Brenan Park was planned to be a housing subdivision and a market area in 1938, with its triangular shape fashioned to take advantage of the topography and views of the surrounding district. The housing subdivision was never constructed.

In 1968 the Smithfield Rugby Club ('Warthogs') successfully lobbied to have a rugby field laid out in the park, using it as the club's home ground until 1982.

The site was used as a sewage disposal depot and landfill until 1980, where it was proclaimed as unhealthy building land in 1981. Following its closure, it was capped with a layer of impervious clay, declared unsuitable for building development in 1981, and subsequently converted into a public reserve. The landfill has resulted in the park's surface being elevated above the surrounding landscape.

In 2010, a proposal to establish a new suburb named Brenan Heights encompassing the area surrounding Brenan Park was put to a community ballot, but did not receive sufficient support.

== Geography ==
The reserve is located in the suburb of Smithfield, and is bordered by Cumberland Highway, Brenan and Bourke Streets, which all give good passive surveillance opportunities from close residences and contiguous roads. The park's surrounds are mainly single-story houses.

Brenan Park is in an elevated and weather-exposed location, with the highest areas being 44 metres (144 ft) AHD and those near the Cumberland Highway at 32 metres (105 ft). The elevated regions in the park are situated alongside Bourke Street, where they would provide a panoramic view of the greater western Sydney area and even the Sydney central business district.

The park is divided into three sporting precincts known as Upper, Middle and Lower Brenan Park. Each precinct contains its own sports fields, amenities building, car park and associated facilities, and is managed separately by Fairfield City Council for sports field hire and bookings.

== Ecology ==
Indigenous trees and shrubs are abundant in the park, with dominant vegetation species being Melaleuca quinquenervia (near the tennis courts), Eucalyptus moluccana (near the car park in Brenan Street), Casuarina glauca, Callistemon viminalis, Paperbark, Acacia, Lomandra and Eucalyptus bosistoana, most of which have large canopies that provide shade.

The boundary along the top part of Bourke Street and near Cumberland Highway is thickly planted with an avenue of trees and shrubs, which provide a sense of entry to the park. The park is predominantly made up of sod and it lies on residual soils that are 1,000-millimetre (39 in) deep. Its trees represent a link to the Cumberland Plain Woodland that covered most of Fairfield local government area before European settlement. There is a shrubby, dry sclerophyll bushland area to the south of the park, near Cumberland Highway.

The corner of Brenan Street and Cumberland Highway provides good viewing site for birdwatching as dozens of bird species flock to the area to feed. Pigeons, ravens, magpies, galahs and crested pigeons are common sightings in the park, and can be seen in flocks feeding off ground food, most especially pigeons and ravens. Bird feeding is not encouraged in the park.

== Facilities ==
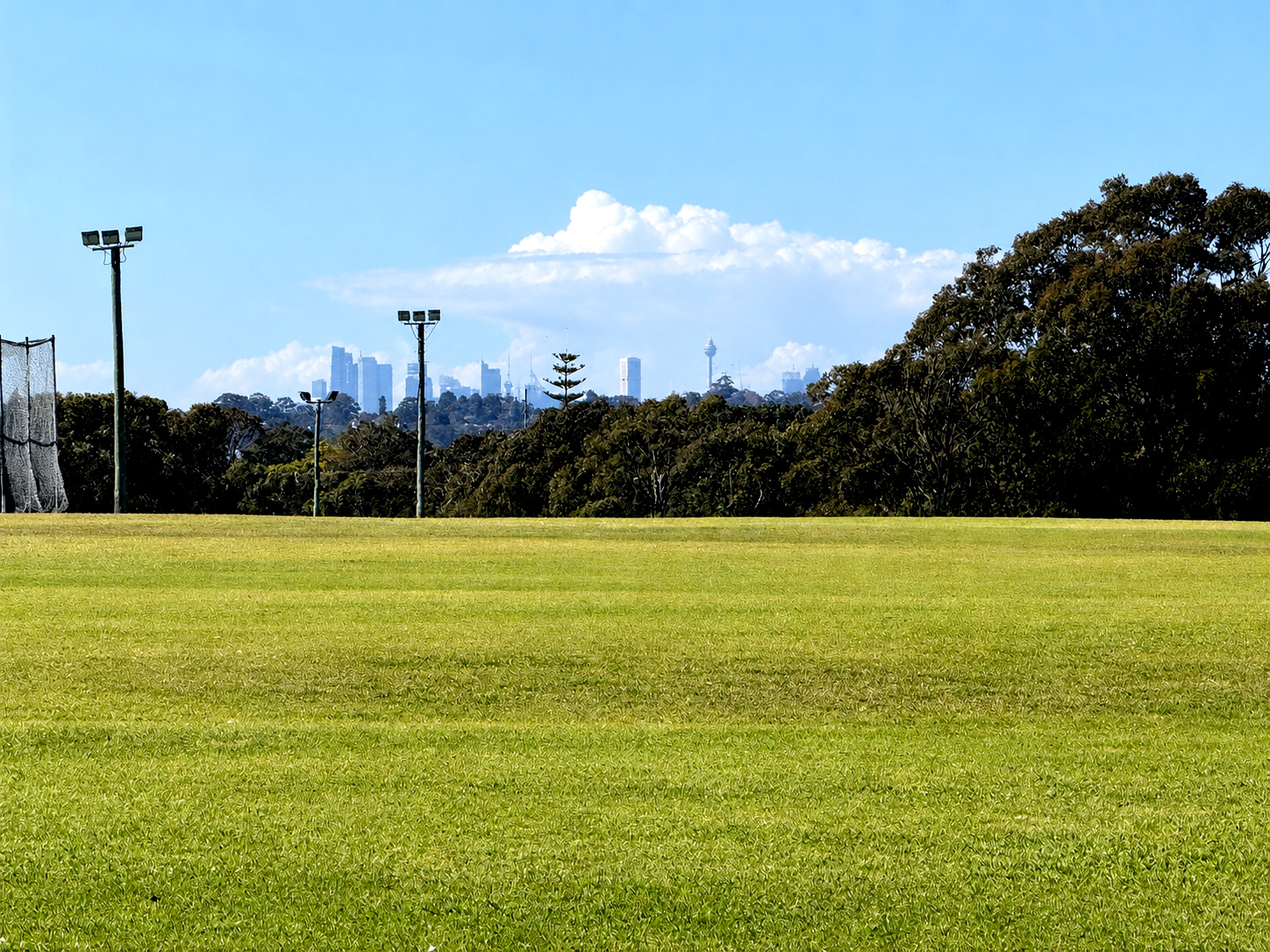
The park's playing field with the Sydney skyline in the background.

The park features six tennis courts, nine soccer fields (six which are full-sized), three cricket pitches, baseball and softball diamonds, three children's playgrounds, picnic areas (with barbeque), an outdoor gym and a 2 km-long (1.2 mi) walking track (shared with cycling) that circuits the park. The park has open space which can be used for kiting and other activities when they are not being used for sport.

The park is floodlit and can be used at nights. Amenity blocks include a community hall, toilet facilities, kiosks and change rooms. The sports fields and the community hall are hired to a number of community groups, schools and clubs. The community hall was used for COVID-19 testing in 2020.

=== Clubs ===
The sports fields are hired by these sporting groups:

- Smithfield RSL Cricket Club
- Smithfield RSL Soccer Club
- Fairfield Patrician Brothers Soccer Club
- Smithfield RSL Baseball Club

== Redevelopment ==
In 2023, Fairfield City Council announced the redevelopment of Brenan Park into a district-level "super park". Community consultation on the concept design was undertaken in June 2023, followed by concept design in July 2024 and detailed design development between February 2025 and June 2026. Construction is scheduled to commence in January 2027. The project will feature an inclusive adventure playground with a climbing tower and slide, a zip line, water play area, in-ground trampolines, accessible carousel (spinner) and swings, outdoor fitness equipment, picnic shelters, footpaths, shade structures, landscaping, CCTV, new signage, toilets and approximately 20 additional parking spaces, with the aim of providing modern, inclusive recreational facilities for all ages and abilities. The redevelopment is funded by a A$5.06 million grant from the NSW Government under the Western Sydney Infrastructure Grants Program, with Fairfield City Council contributing a further A$372,720, for a total project cost of approximately A$5.43 million.

== Gallery ==
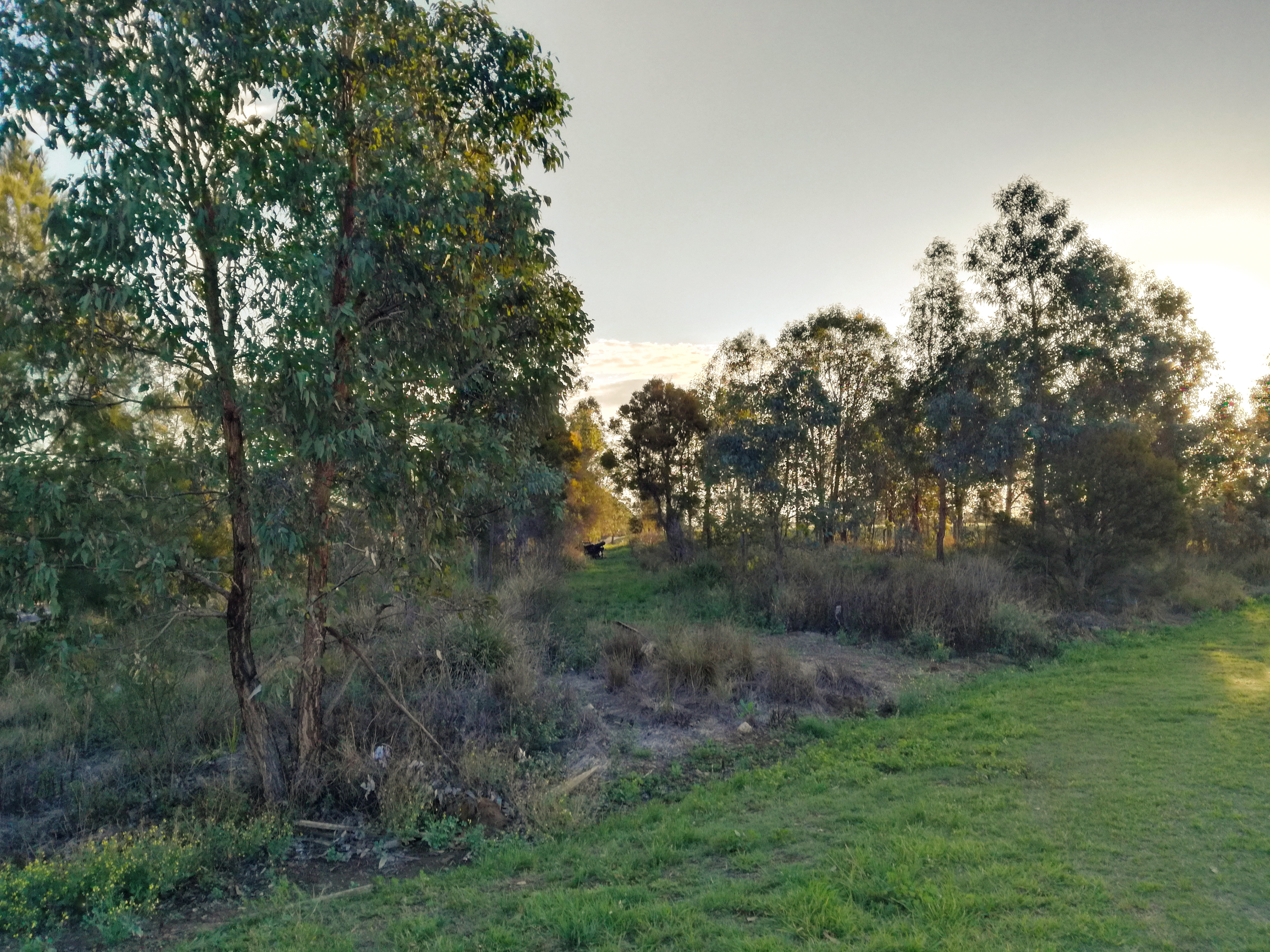
A bushland in the park's southern vicinity.

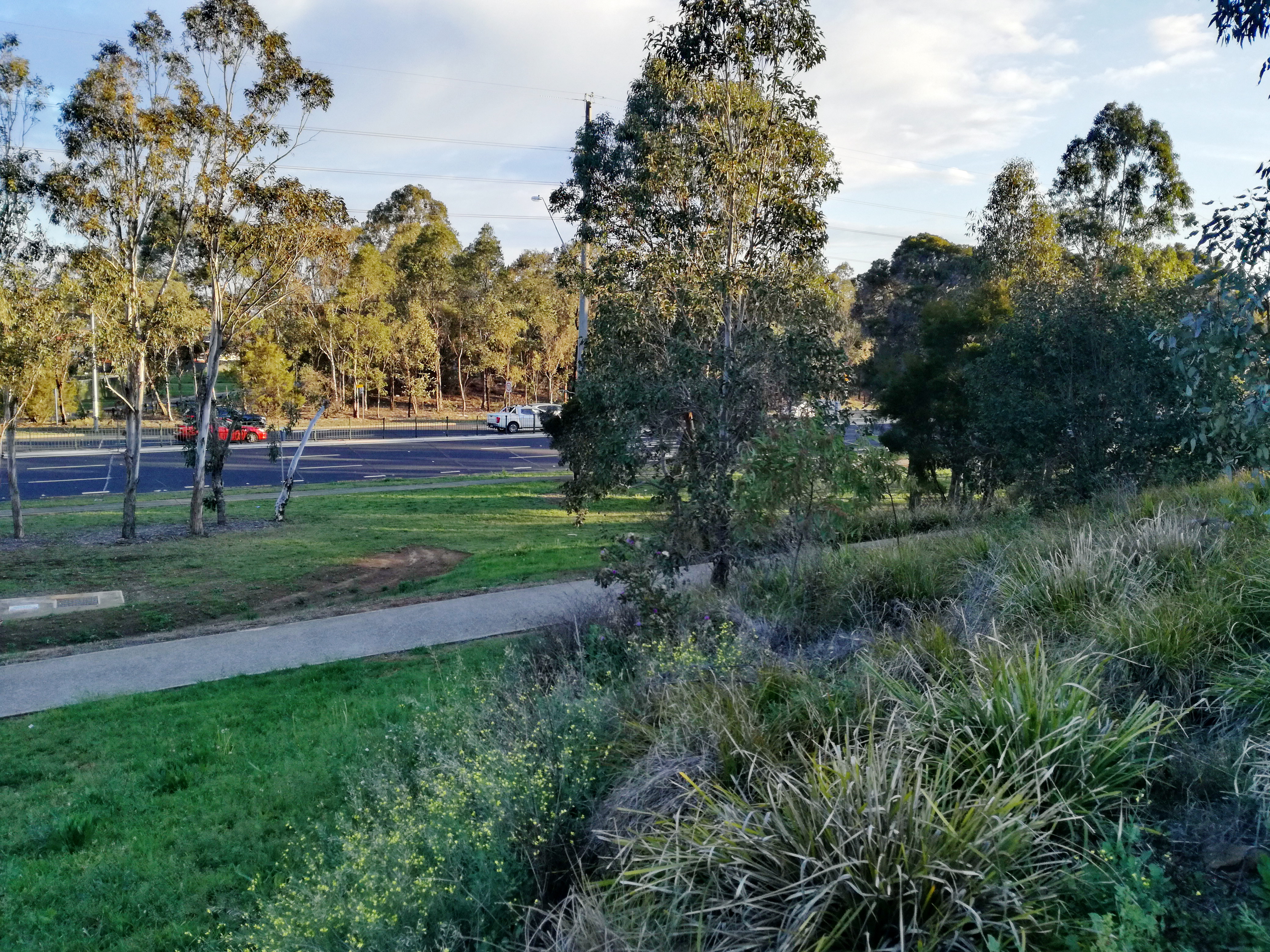
Cumberland Highway as seen from the Brenan Park walking track.

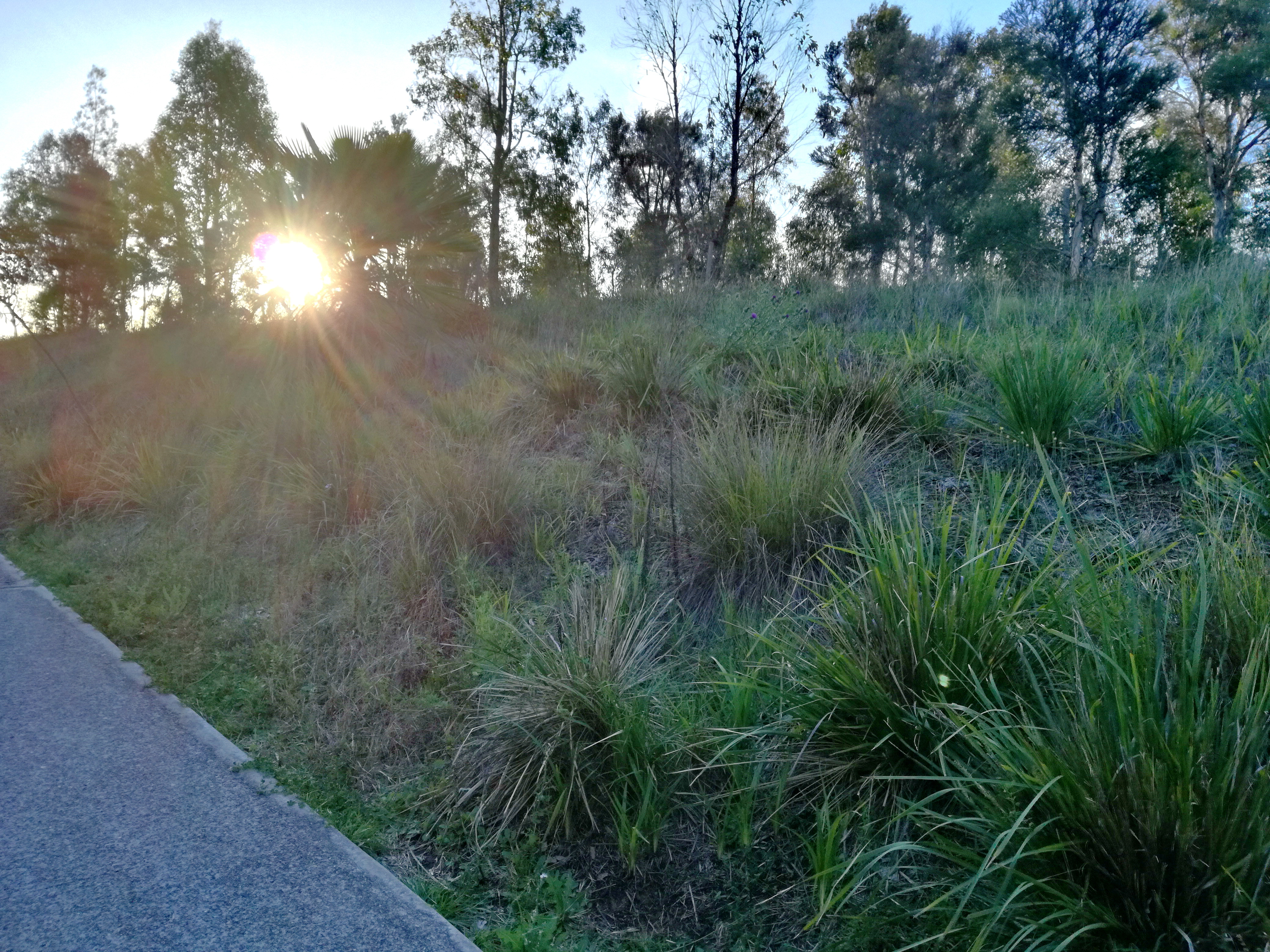
A sloped shrubby area near the walking track to the south of the park.

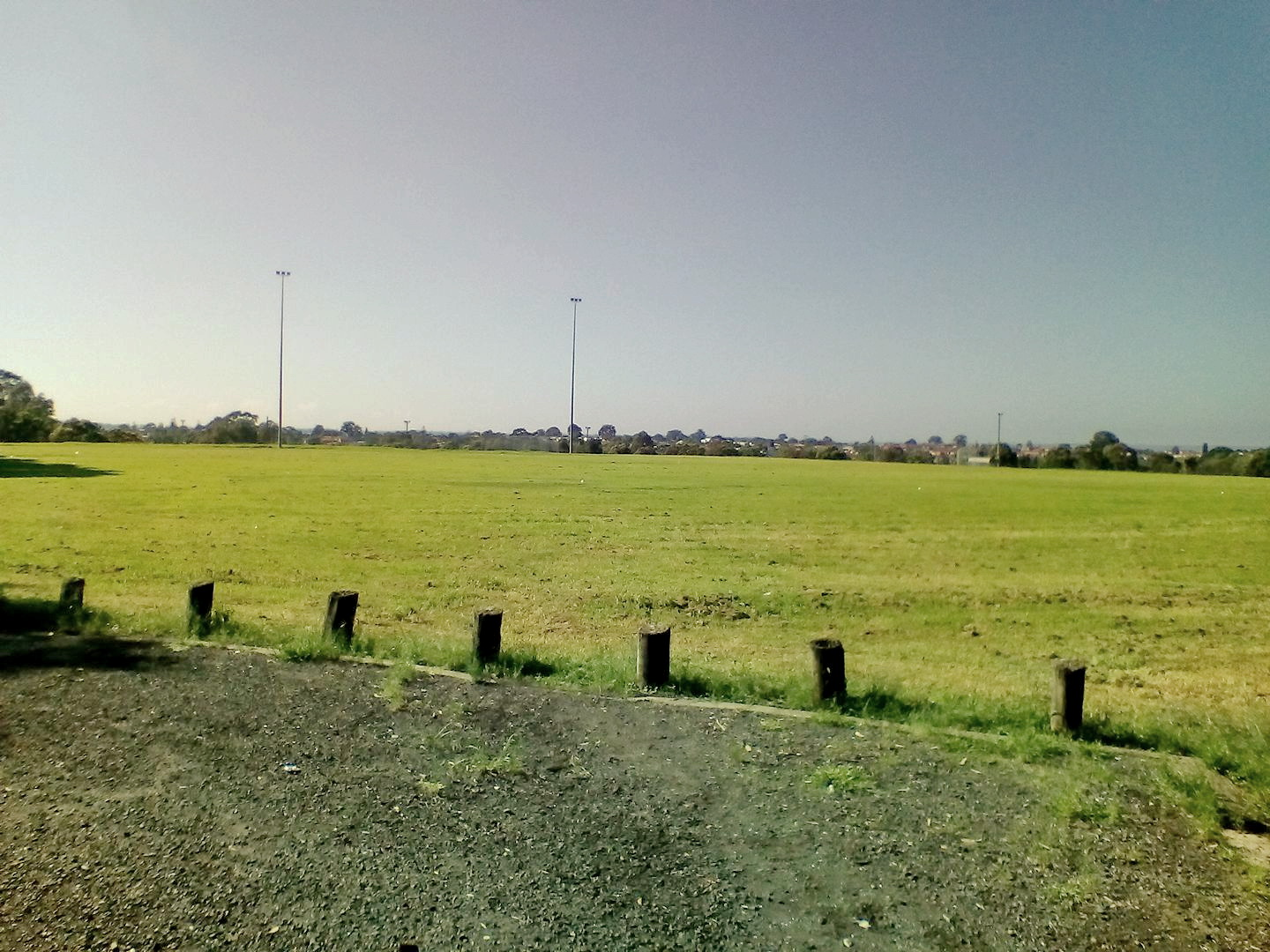
The open fields of Brenan Park.

== See also ==
- Wetherill Park Nature Reserve
- Fairfield Park Precinct
- Western Sydney Parklands
- Central Gardens Nature Reserve
- Rosford Street Reserve
