= Prospect Creek =

Prospect Creek is the name of the following:

== Communities ==
In the United States

- Prospect Creek, Alaska, site of the coldest US temperature observation (-80 °F)

== Watercourses ==
In the United States

- Prospect Creek, Montana
- Prospect Creek, Washington

In Australia

- Prospect Creek (New South Wales)
- Prospect Creek (Victoria)
- Prospect Creek (Western Australia)
