= Western Sydney Parklands–Canal Reserve cycleway =

Shared use path in Sydney, New South Wales, Australia

Western Sydney Parklands-Canal Reserve cycleway
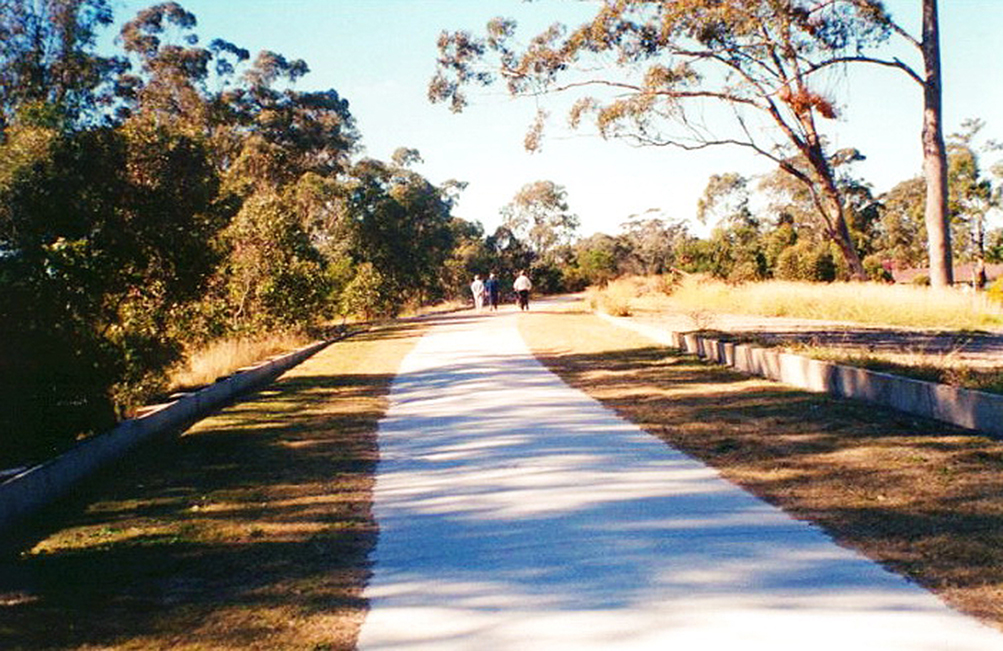
- The shared cycleway at the Lower Prospect Canal Reserve
- Length: 16.4 kilometres (10.2 mi)
- Location: Western Sydney, New South Wales, Australia
- Trailheads: Calmsley Hill Farm in Western Sydney Regional Park, Abbotsbury (southwest), Prospect Nature Reserve in the (north); to Fowler Road in Merrylands (southeast)
- Use: Cycling; pedestrians
- Elevation change: 52 metres (171 ft)
- Highest point: 90 metres (300 ft) AHD
- Lowest point: 38 metres (125 ft) AHD
- Difficulty: Easy
- Season: All seasons
- Sights: Boothtown Aqueduct, Prospect Reservoir
- Hazards: Flooding, snakes, falling trees

The Western Sydney Parklands-Canal Reserve cycleway is a 16.4-kilometre-long (10.2 mi), semi-crescent shaped, shared-use path for cyclists and pedestrians that is generally aligned with Prospect Nature Reserve, Western Sydney Regional Park and the Lower Prospect Canal Reserve in Sydney, New South Wales, Australia.

Mostly off-road, the long cycleway features two divisions, Prospect Dam to Abbotsbury Cyclepath in the west and the Prospect–Canal Reserve Cycleway in the east, where it begins at Calmsley Hill Farm in Western Sydney Parklands and ends at Merrylands to the far east. It passes through the local government areas of Fairfield and Cumberland City Council.

== Route ==
=== Abbotsbury to Prospect Dam ===
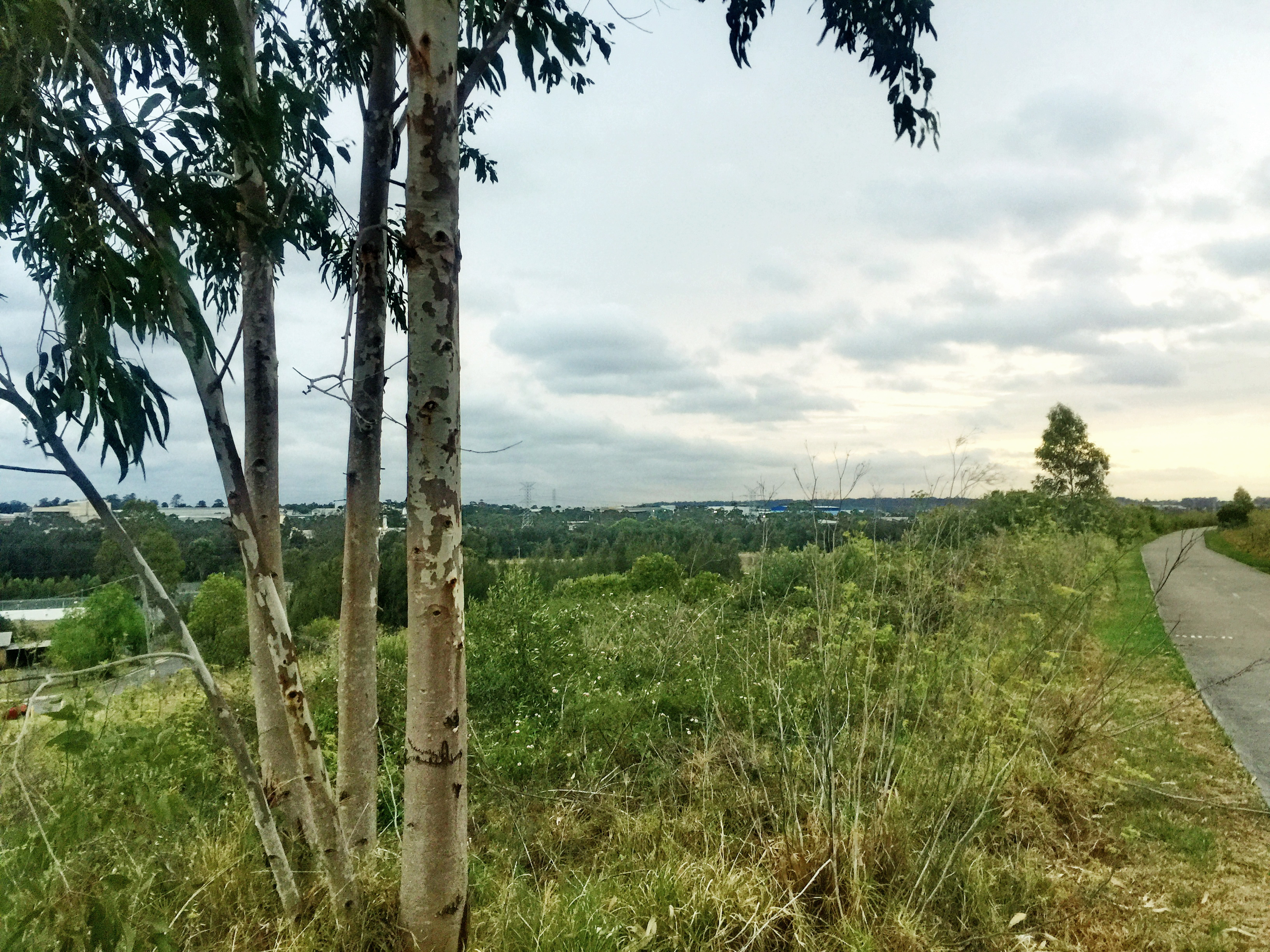
The shared path passing through Marrong Reserve South

The fully paved, off-road section of the cycleway begins at Calmsley Hill City Farm in Abbotsbury, within Western Sydney Parklands, and extends for 8-kilometre (5.0 mi) to the Prospect Dam wall picnic area. The route crosses The Horsley Drive at a signalised intersection, while the smaller Chandos Road is crossed at grade. An off-road path alongside The Horsley Drive provides a connection to the Westlink M7 cycleway. The route provides access to Western Sydney Parklands and numerous mountain biking trails of varying difficulty. A rest area known as The Dairy provides toilet facilities and potable water.

The route passes through largely undeveloped parkland, with little adjacent vehicle traffic or pedestrian activity. The section between The Horsley Drive and The Dairy is particularly scenic, featuring gentle undulations and sweeping bends. A steep descent and climb occur near Calmsley Hill City Farm. A short detour leads up a steep hill to Moonrise Lookout, which provides views across the Sydney Basin and Western Sydney Parklands. The cycleway also provides access to the Prospect Dam from Chandos Road and connects with trails leading towards Walder Park in Prospect Nature Reserve.

=== Prospect Dam to Canal Reserve ===
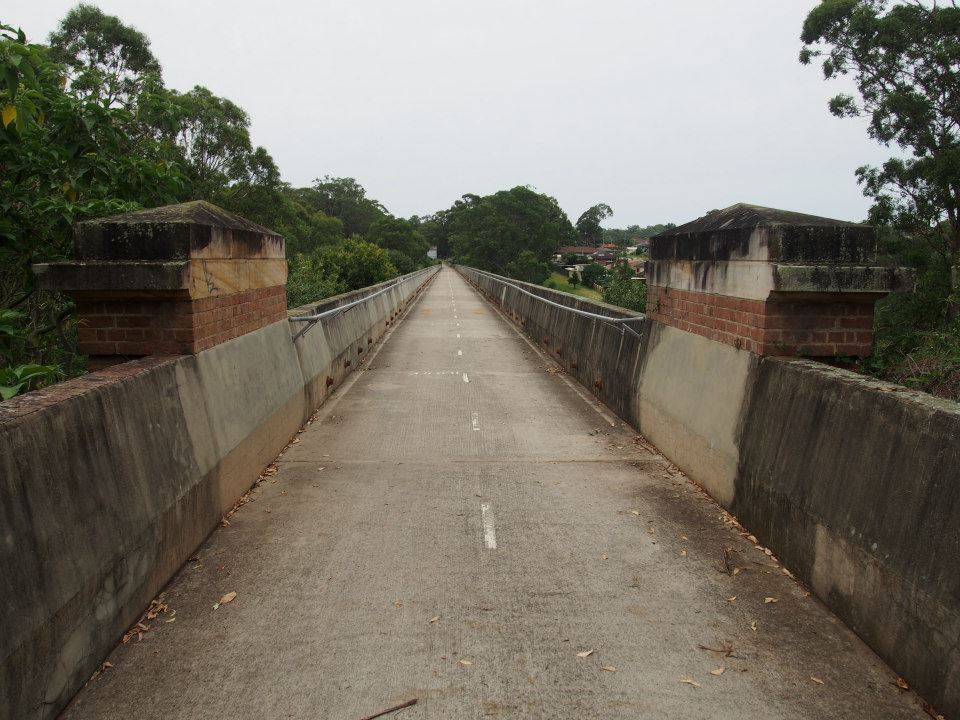
The cycleway on the Boothtown Aqueduct

South of Prospect Dam, the cycleway continues through Prospect Nature Reserve, passing south of Walder Park before crossing Prospect Highway and continuing through Prospect Hill. It passes the southern side of Marrong Reserve and provides access to the Prospect Creek cycleway via Hyland Road. The route then crosses the Boothtown Aqueduct before continuing east to the Pipehead at Guildford West and terminating at Fowler Road in Merrylands.

Access points are located at Frank Street, Albert Street at the corner of Tennyson Parade, Sherwood Road, Cumberland Highway, Cumberland Road, Macquarie Road, Taylor Street, Gipps Road, Bayfield Road and Hyland Road in Greystanes, as well as Reconciliation Road in Wetherill Park and Prospect Reservoir.

The cycleway has no road crossings along a 6.5-kilometre (4.0 mi) section, where the original canal bridges have been retained and incorporated into the route. This makes the section suitable for family cycling. At its western end, the cycleway connects with paths leading to Pemulwuy and Wetherill Park, while its eastern end connects with the Parramatta–Liverpool Rail Trail. A connection to the Liverpool–Parramatta T-way cycleway is provided near the Cumberland Highway. A water bubbler is located near the Taylor Street access point, approximately 2-kilometre (1.2 mi) west of the Cumberland Highway.

The path was closed at Prospect Dam in 2010 due to works carried out by Boral, resulting in community outcry. The path was restored to working order in September 2010 and is currently usable at the western end to the Prospect Dam area boundary with an at grade traffic light crossing of Reconciliation Road. The path was closed at Prospect Dam from September 2013 to March 2015 due to maintenance work on the dam wall and a major underground electricity cable was laid through the reserve alongside the path and many of the entry/exit paths were then replaced. Community groups continue to fight for a bridge over Reconciliation Road with some funding provided by the previous Labour State government but funding remains uncompleted ever since March 2014.

== See also ==
- Bike paths in Sydney
