= Western Sydney Regional Park =

Regional park in Sydney, Australia

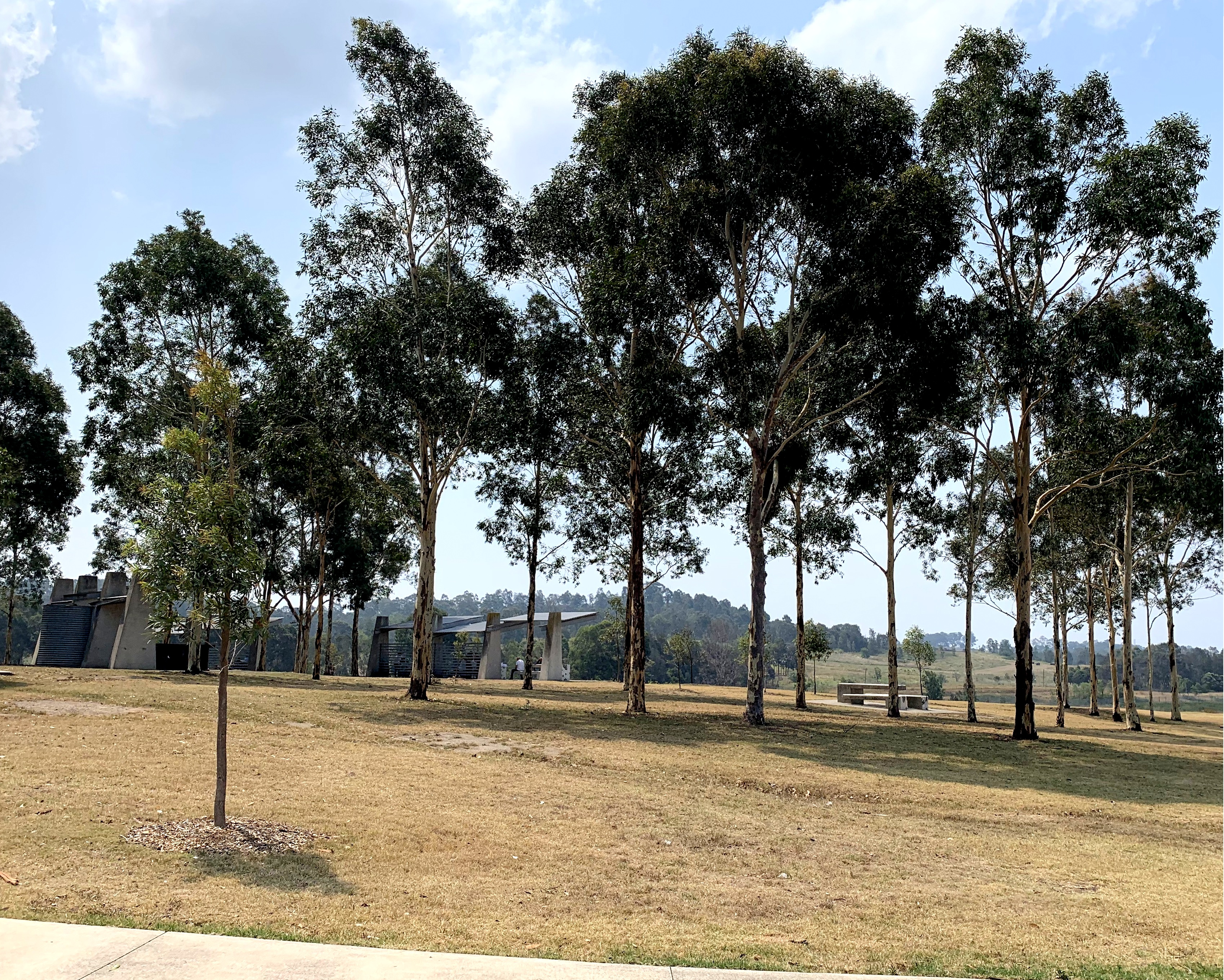
- Picnic benches
- Interactive map of Western Sydney Regional Park
- Type: Urban park, wildlife park, nature reserve
- Location: Abbotsbury and Horsley Park
- Coordinates: 33°52′08″S 150°51′34″E
- Area: 583 ha (1,440 acres)
- Elevation: 60–100 metres (197–328 ft)
- Opened: 1997
- Owner: NSW National Parks and Wildlife Service
- Operator: Fairfield City Council
- Status: Open all year

Western Sydney Regional Park is a large urban park and a nature reserve situated in Western Sydney, Australia within the suburbs of Horsley Park and Abbotsbury. A precinct of Western Sydney Parklands, and situated within the heart of the Cumberland Plain Woodland, the regional park features several picnic areas, recreational facilities, equestrian trails, and walking paths within the Australian bush.

The park is governed by the NSW National Parks and Wildlife Service and is listed under the National Parks and Wildlife Act 1974. In a 2009–10 survey, the park had attracted approximately 430,000 visitors per annum.

== History ==
The Parkland was an area of specialty for the Darug people and it is still deemed as important by the Aboriginal Land Council. The Parkland has been visited by some early settlers, such as Edward Abbott and George Johnson. The Park was originally used for agricultural purposes which included gardening, dairy farming and grazing.

Prominent early settlers such as Edward Abbott and George Johnson have been associated with the park. The original homestead of Abbotsbury is located within the park, and is leased by the Sydney International Equestrian Centre. In the late 1970s, the northern parts of the regional park had areas for rural residential lots (near Horsley Park), though by 1997 the area was designated as Western Sydney Regional Park, which is 583 hectares in size.

== Geography ==
The regional park is bounded by Westlink M7 to the west in Cecil Park, The Horsley Drive to the north in Horsley Park, Cowpasture Drive to the east in Bossley Park and Elizabeth Drive to the south near Cecil Hills. There exists market gardens in the north, residential piece of land to the east and south, and agricultural residential and rural industrial properties to the west. The regional park is situated within the Fairfield local government area, the Hawkesbury-Nepean and Georges Rivers catchment areas and the Deerubbin Local Aboriginal Land Council’s area. The park is mainly a savanna (i.e. grassy woodland), though it grades into a dry sclerophyll woodland in the southern portion.

Located in the Sydney Basin, the park features three types of soils; the main one being Luddenham soil landscape, which originates from Wianamatta Group Shales on wavy hills, in addition to a small area of Picton Soil landscape. A ridgeline streams from north to south of the park which provides significant regional views from the elevated areas, such as the Moonrise lookout picnic spot in the west of the park. This ridgeline is linked with Prospect Hill to the east near Prospect Reservoir. The regional park rises as one moves to the west of it, with the elevation reaching 140 metres (460 ft) at its highest point. Eastern Creek flows southwards at the park's northern end and Ropes Creek flows in the west. The park also features small ponds and wetlands which are a refuge for the native wildlife.

Furthermore, two radio telecommunication towers are situated in the regional park on Border Road. The regional park features a part of the Upper Canal System (by Sydney Water), which was constructed in the late 1800s. Bonnyrigg Reservoir is situated at the southern point of the park.

== Ecology ==
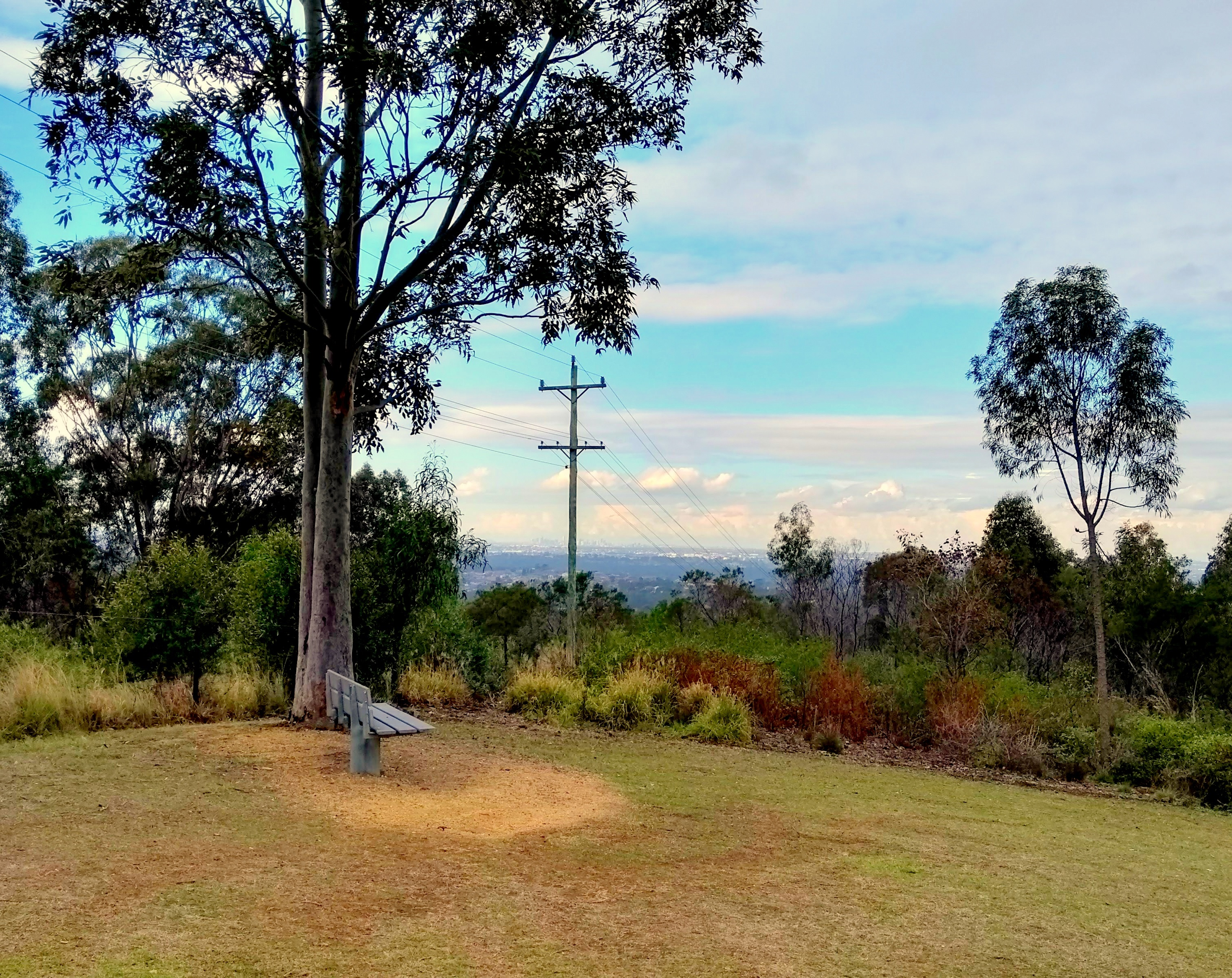
Moonrise Lookout with views of the Sydney skyline.

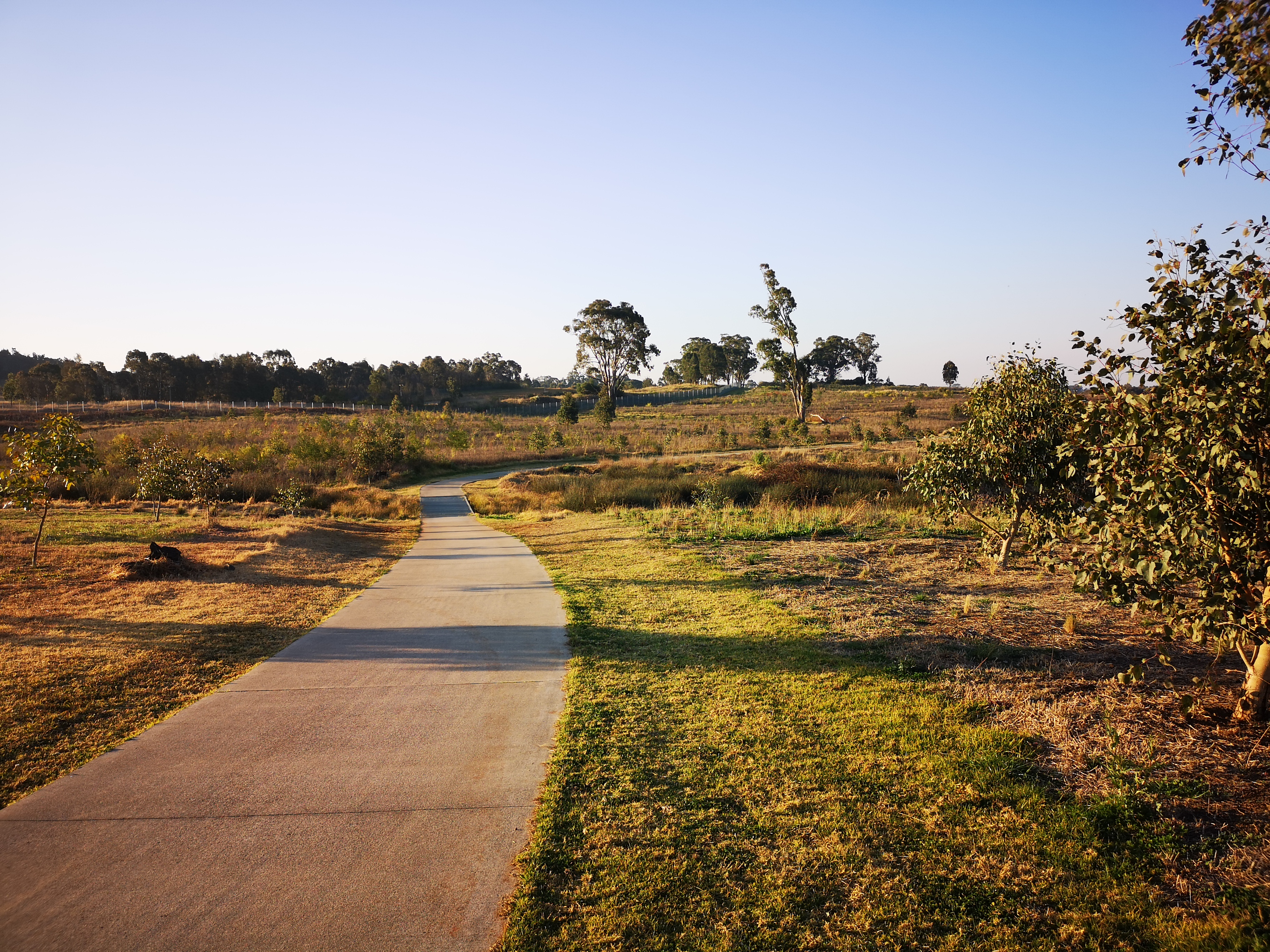
A walking path in the park's savannah-like environment

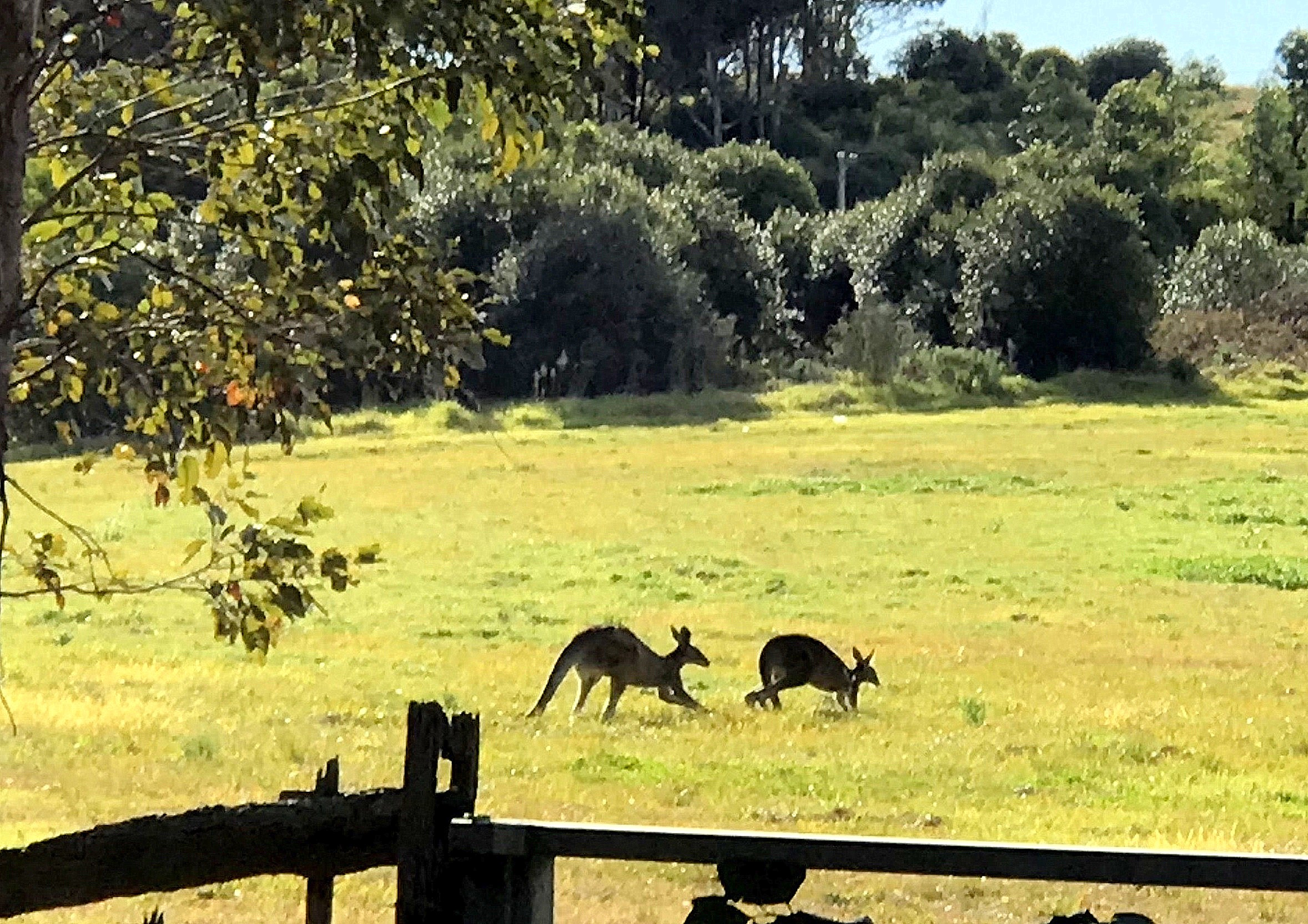
Wallabies spotted in The Dairy

Western Sydney Regional Park features around 135 hectares of developed natural woodland communities where the bulk of the regional park constitutes 427 hectares of planted revegetation and cleared grassland environments, thus providing multifarious habitat areas for wildlife and vegetation communities.

Four vegetation zones are known within the park, which are endangered ecological communities. They are:

- Cumberland Plain Woodland: Features the Shale Plains and Shale Hills Woodland, both of which are listed as a critically endangered ecological communities in the Cumberland Plain
- River-Flat Eucalypt Forest: Found on coastal floodplain with the subtype Alluvial Woodland
- Western Sydney Dry Rainforest: Found in a small pocked of the regional park, and is listed as an endangered ecological community
- Moist Shale Woodland: Also listed as an endangered ecological community

=== Vegetation ===
The main trees in the regional park's grassy woodlands include Eucalyptus moluccana, Eucalyptus tereticornis, Eucalyptus crebra, Corymbia maculata, with Eucalyptus eugenioides occurring more rarely. The shrub layer in the park is covered with Bursaria spinosa, with grasses such as Themeda australis and Microlaena stipoides var stipoides. The understorey plants usually rely on underground tubers or abundant annual seed production to survive untoward conditions. Cynanchum elegans, Pimelea spicata and Acacia pubescens are listed as endangered species.

The most widespread riparian and floodplain plants in the park include Eucalyptus tereticornis, Eucalyptus amplifolia, Angophora floribunda and Angophora subvelutina. Some smaller trees occur, such as, Melaleuca decora, Melaleuca styphelioides, Backhousia myrtifolia, Melia azedarach, Casuarina cunninghamiana and Casuarina glauca. Apportioned shrubs include Bursaria spinosa, Solanum prinophyllum, Rubus parvifolius, Breynia oblongifolia, Ozothamnus diosmifolius, Hymenanthera dentata, Acacia floribunda and Phyllanthus gunnii. The groundcover in the river flat areas mainly consist of forbs, scramblers and grasses including Microlaena stipoides, Dichondra repens, Glycine clandestina, Oplismenus aemulus, Desmodium gunnii, Pratia purpurascens, Entolasia marginata, Oxalis perennans and Veronica plebeia.

The Western Sydney Dry Rainforest, which is to the west of the park, features Melaleuca styphelioides, Acacia implexa and Alectryon subcinereus. Shrubs include Notelaea longifolia, Clerodendrum tomentosum and Pittosporum revolutum, including vines such as Aphanopetalum resinosum, Pandorea pandorana and Cayratia clematidea, whereby forming heavy thickets in sheltered areas.

The Moist Shale Woodland in the park features a shrubby understorey that has plants from moist habitats. They include Eucalyptus tereticornis, E. moluccana, E. crebra and Corymbia maculata. Smaller trees, such as Acacia implexa and Acacia parramattensis ssp parramattensis are also predominant. The shrub layer includes Breynia oblongifolia, Clerodendrum tomentosum and Sigesbeckia orientalis ssp orientalis. Invasive plant species include, Araujia sericifera, Cardiospermum grandiflorum, Asparagus asparagoides, Rubus ulmifolius, Cestrum parqui, Lantana camara, Olea europaea subsp. cuspidata, Ligustrum lucidum, Ligustrum sinense and Lycium ferocissimum.

=== Wildlife ===
A Wildlife Atlas survey has observed and identified 167 vertebrate fauna species in the regional park, with records since 1980. Animals in the river flats include cormorants and egrets, such as Pandion haliaetus, Egretta novaehollandiae, Haliastur sphenurus, Haliaeetus leucogaster, Phascogale tapoatafa, Petaurus australis, Petaurus norfolcensis, Petaurus breviceps and Pteropus poliocephalus. The Moist Shale Woodland area in the regional park provides a decent habitat for birds and insects, in addition to convenient nests for mammals and birds.

Threatened animal species such as Falsistrellus tasmaniensis, Daphoenositta chrysoptera, Hieraaetus morphnoides, Mormopterus norfolkensis, Neophema pulchella and Meridolum corneovirens, as well as two bat species Miniopterus schreibersii and Scoteanax rueppellii. Pest animals include Oryctolagus cuniculus, Vulpes vulpes, Lepus capensis and Rattus rattus.

== Recreation ==
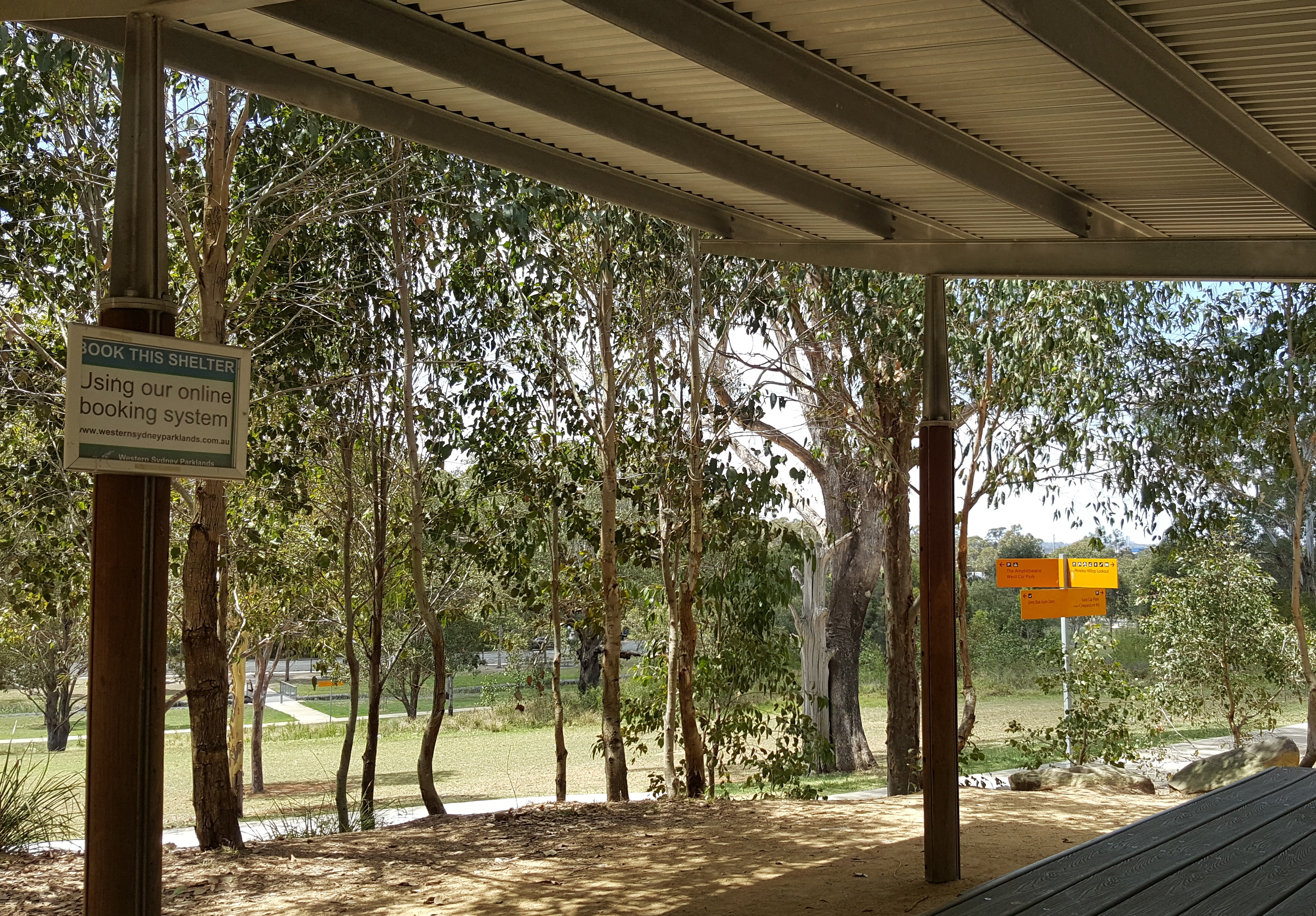
Picnic shelter in The Dairy

The park is particularly used for family picnics, walking, jogging, cycling, fitness and for its natural environment. Western Sydney Regional Park contains Calmsley Hill City Farm, which is protected under State Heritage listing. The park is visited by school students for cross-country, sports and for environmental education. Other visitors include disabled groups, childcare and mothers groups. The park features a broad system of walking and cycling opportunities on various tracks which link the several fundamental recreational areas. One of the main cycling networks within the park is the Western Sydney Parklands-Canal Reserve cycleway. The park also features the Sydney International Equestrian Centre, which was built for the 2000 Olympic Games.

The park's main recreational points include Pimelea, Sugarloaf Ridge, The Dairy and Plough and Harrow picnic areas, all of which have shelters, playgrounds and free barbeques, in addition to large parking spaces. There exists a walking track called the Spotted Gum Trail, which is 3 km in length, that loops around Plough and Harrow within the native bushland, thereby allowing walkers to encounter kangaroos and wallabies, in addition to birdwatching. Every entrance to the recreation spots contains prominent planting accompanied by a large signage to indicate access. Access to the park is through Cowpasture Road, Elizabeth Drive and The Horsley Drive.

Recreational areas and facilities include:

- Lizard Log – Features a nature themed playground for children, over 20 picnic shelters, scenic walks, a pavilion and an amphitheater.
- The Dairy – Features picnic shelters and electric barbeques on a hilltop location.
- Plough and Harrow – An area surrounded by native bushland that features a café, a playground, over 20 picnic areas, a high ropes course and an open space at the west end.
- Moonrise Lookout – A recreational lookout area that has an altitude ranging from 130 to 140 metres (430 to 460 ft) above sea level.
- Sugarloaf Ridge – Also a highly elevated lookout area, adjacent to the above place, which features two large picnic shelters.
- Calmsley Hill City Farm – An educational farm aimed for school children.
- Sydney International Equestrian Centre – A facility which was used to host equestrian events during the 2000 Summer Olympics and 2000 Summer Paralympics.
- TreeTops Adventure Park – An attraction that features high ropes on tree tops, and includes activities such as multiple zip lines and aerial challenges on the native trees.

The regional park features five walking loops, which all have trail grades:

- Moonrise Loop – A challenging, 6.2km walk which features lookouts, and animals such as kangaroos and wallabies being spotted.
- Pimelea Loop – An easy 1.6km walk that links Lizard Log and The Dairy with playgrounds, lookouts and waterways.
- Sugarloaf Loop – A challenging, 2km walk that offers views of Western Sydney and the Sydney CBD skyline.
- Spotted Gums Trail – A 3km long, demanding trail that goes through spotted gum trees.
- Plough and Harrow Loop – A gentle 1.6km loop that crosses the picnic areas of the parkland.

== Gallery ==
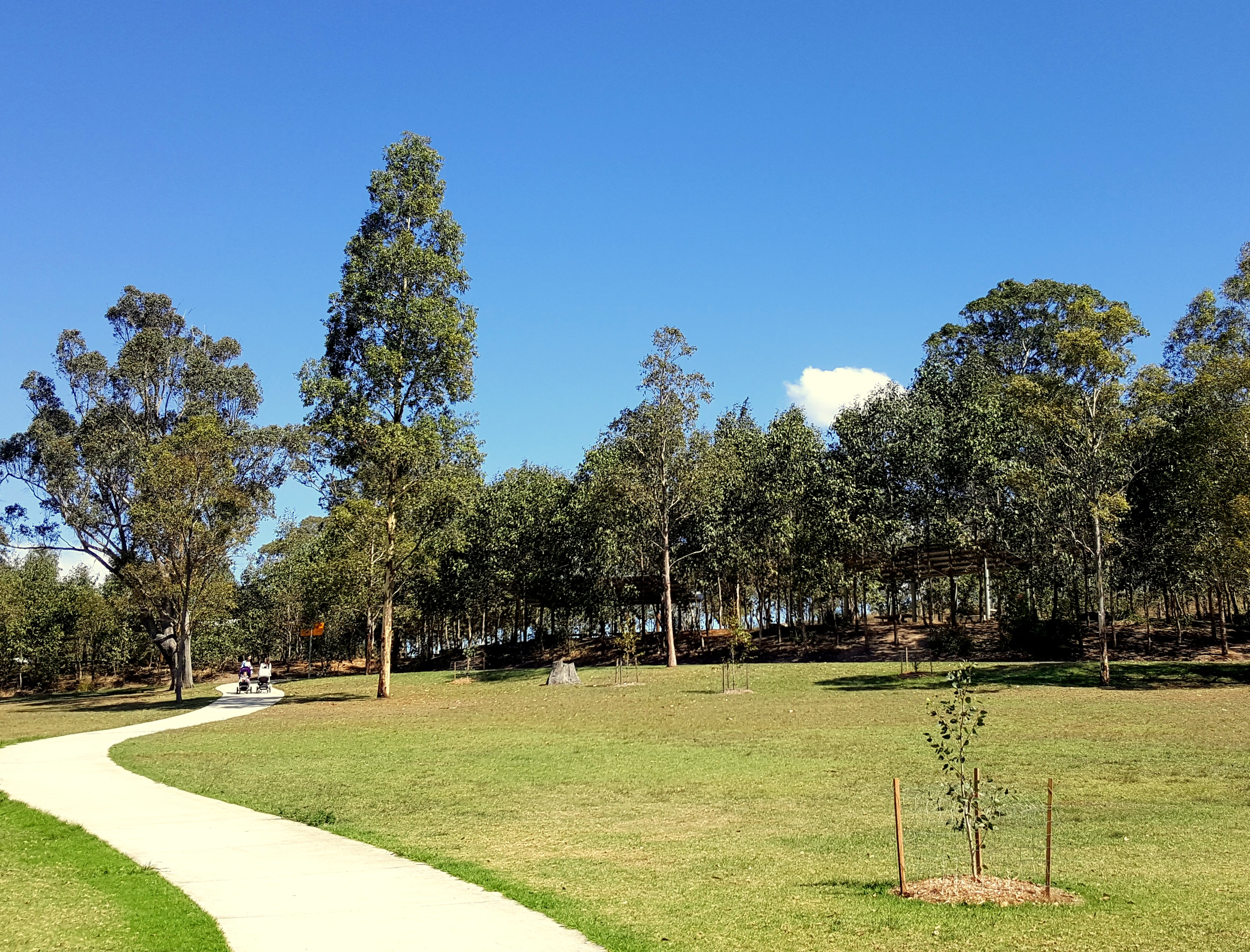
Walking path in The Dairy

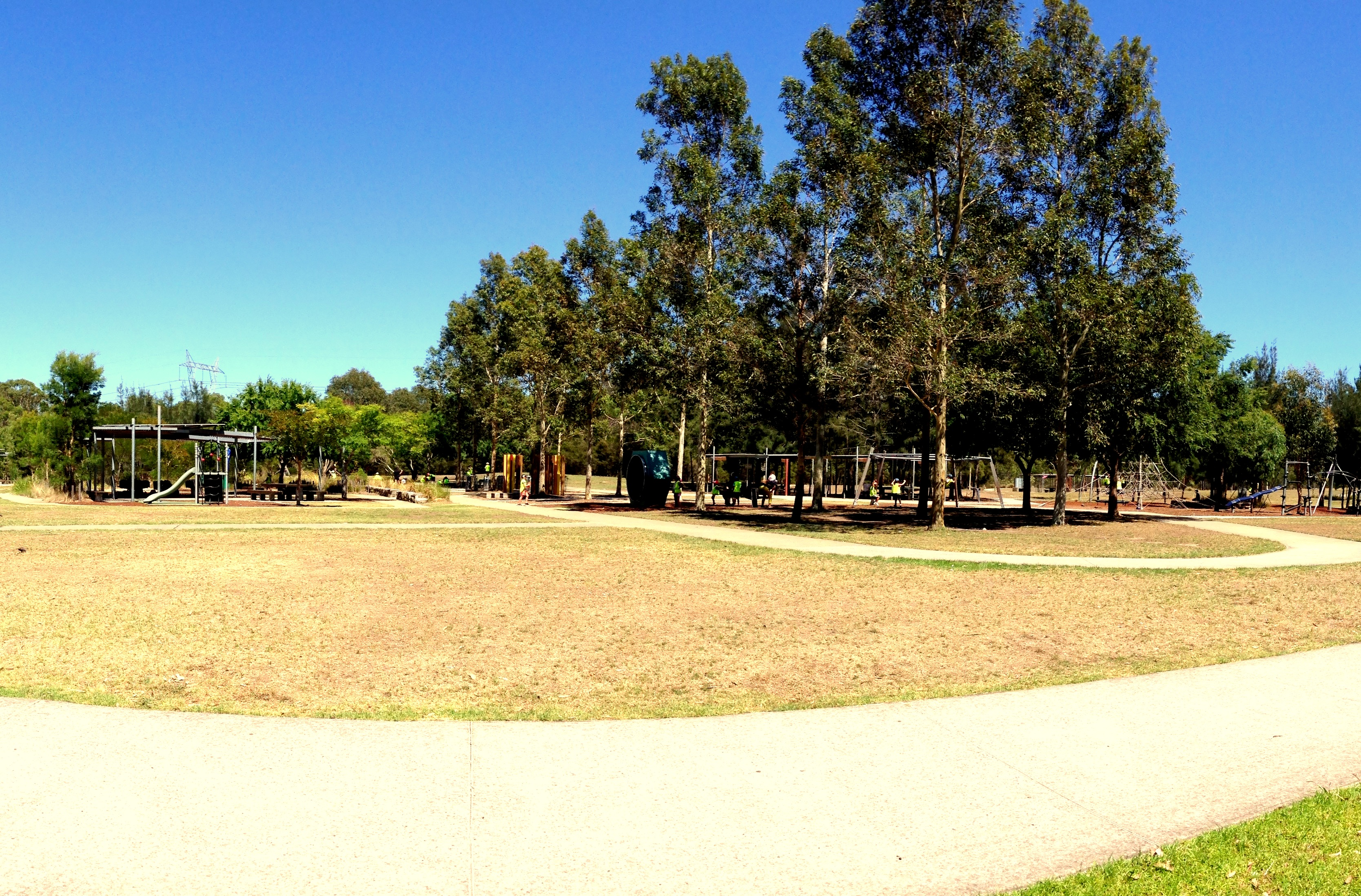
Walking path near Plough and Harrow picnic area

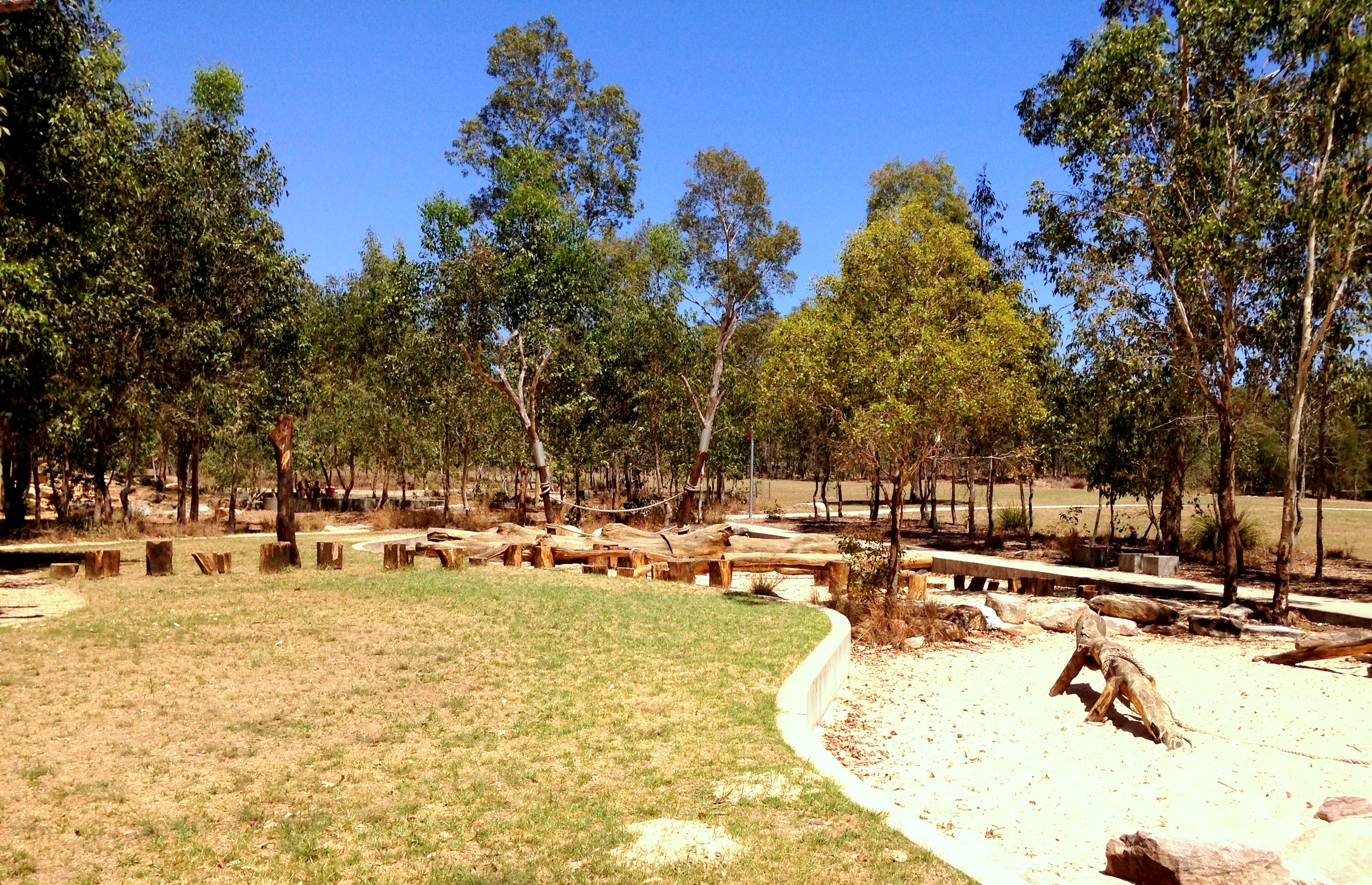
Lizard Log play area

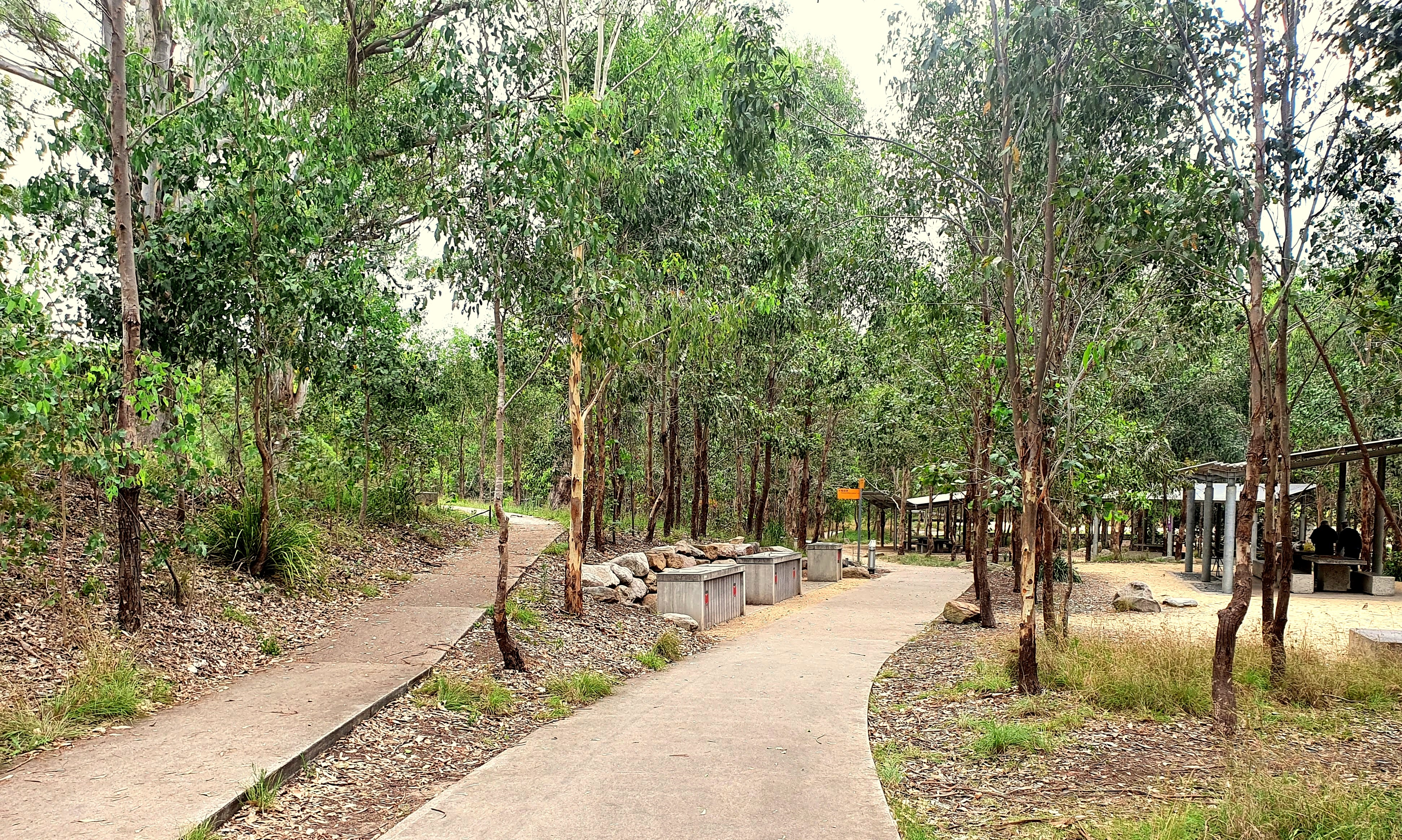
Picnic shelters

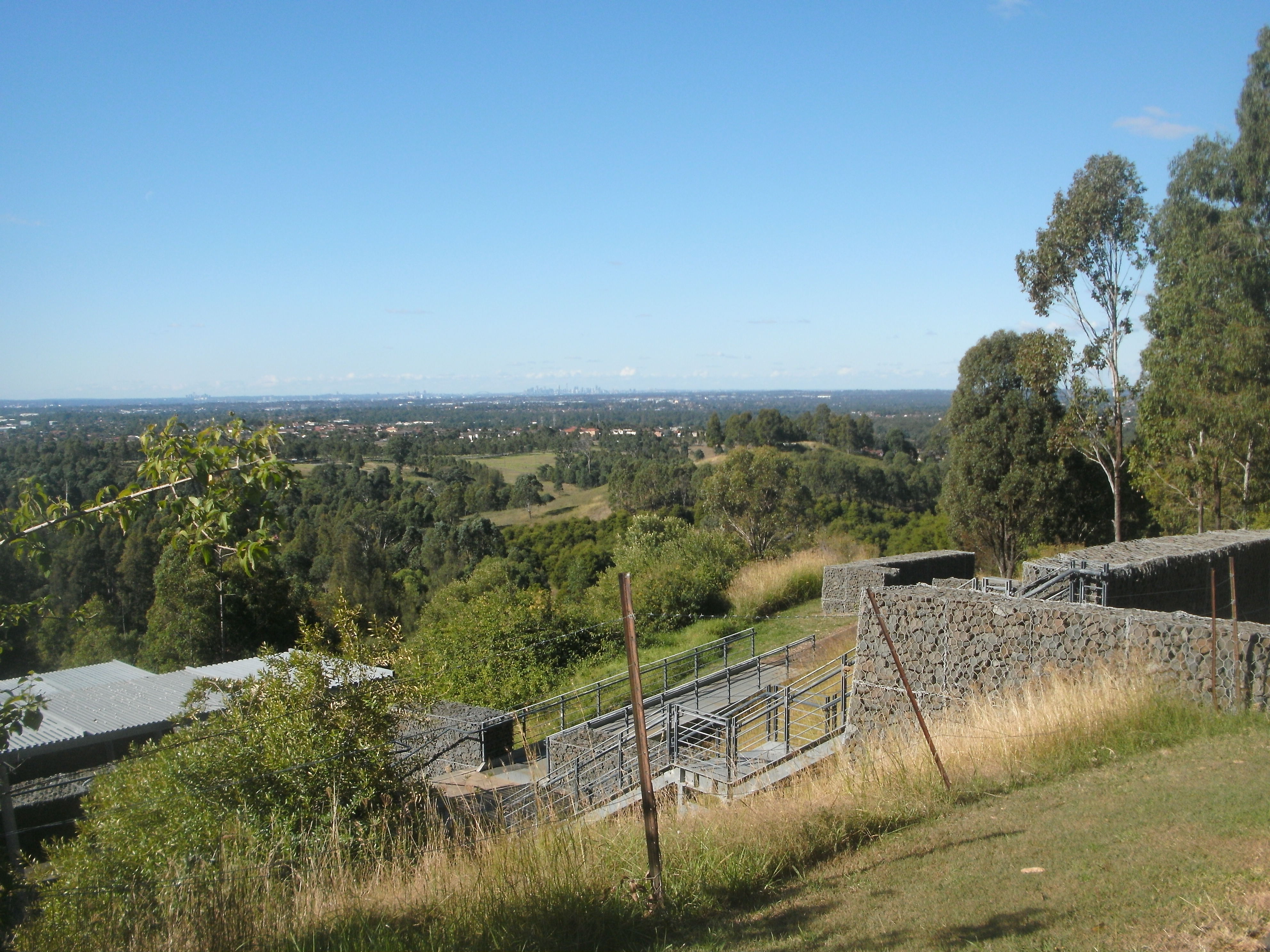
Sugarloaf Ridge picnic area

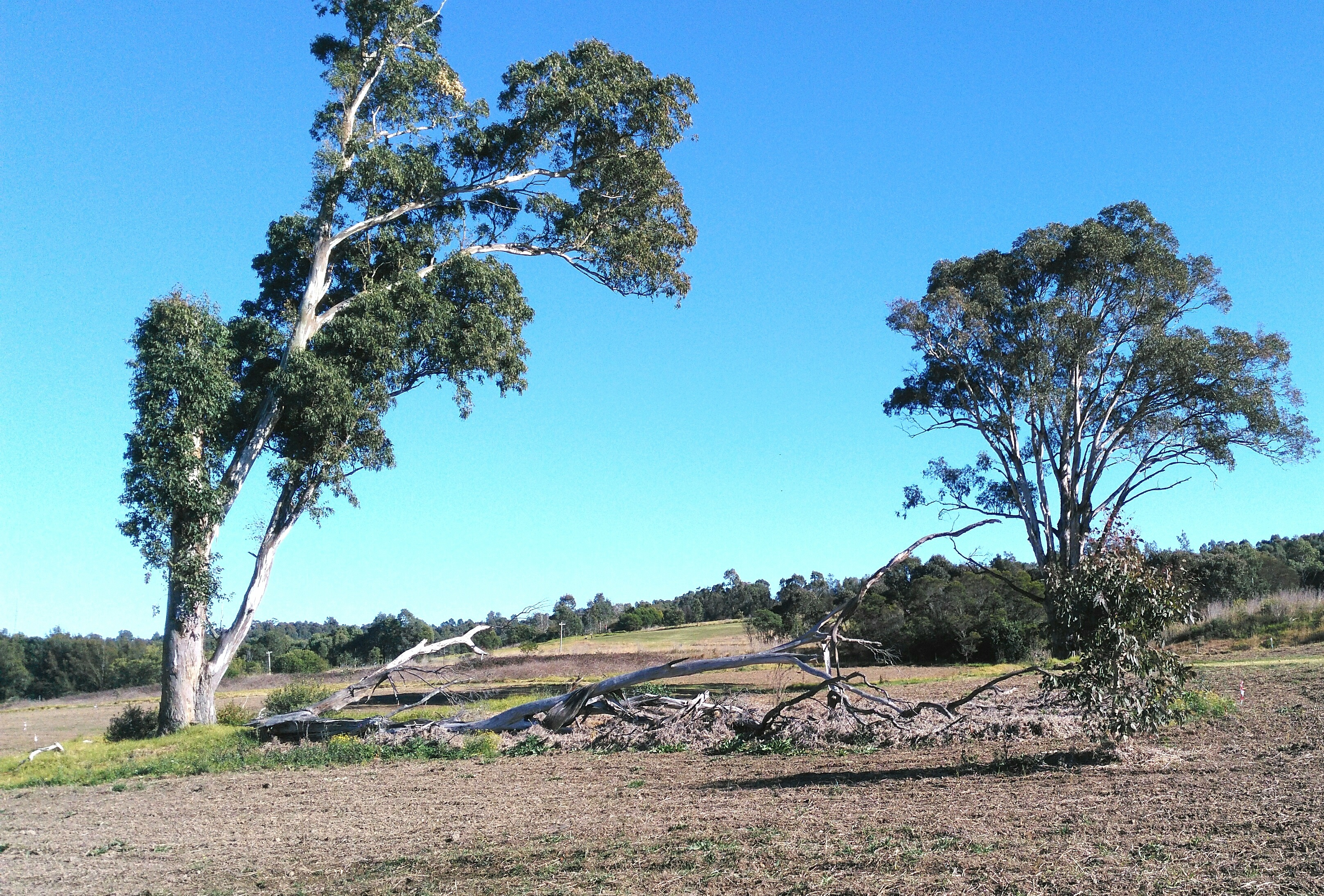
A small savanna (grassy woodland) near Lizard Log

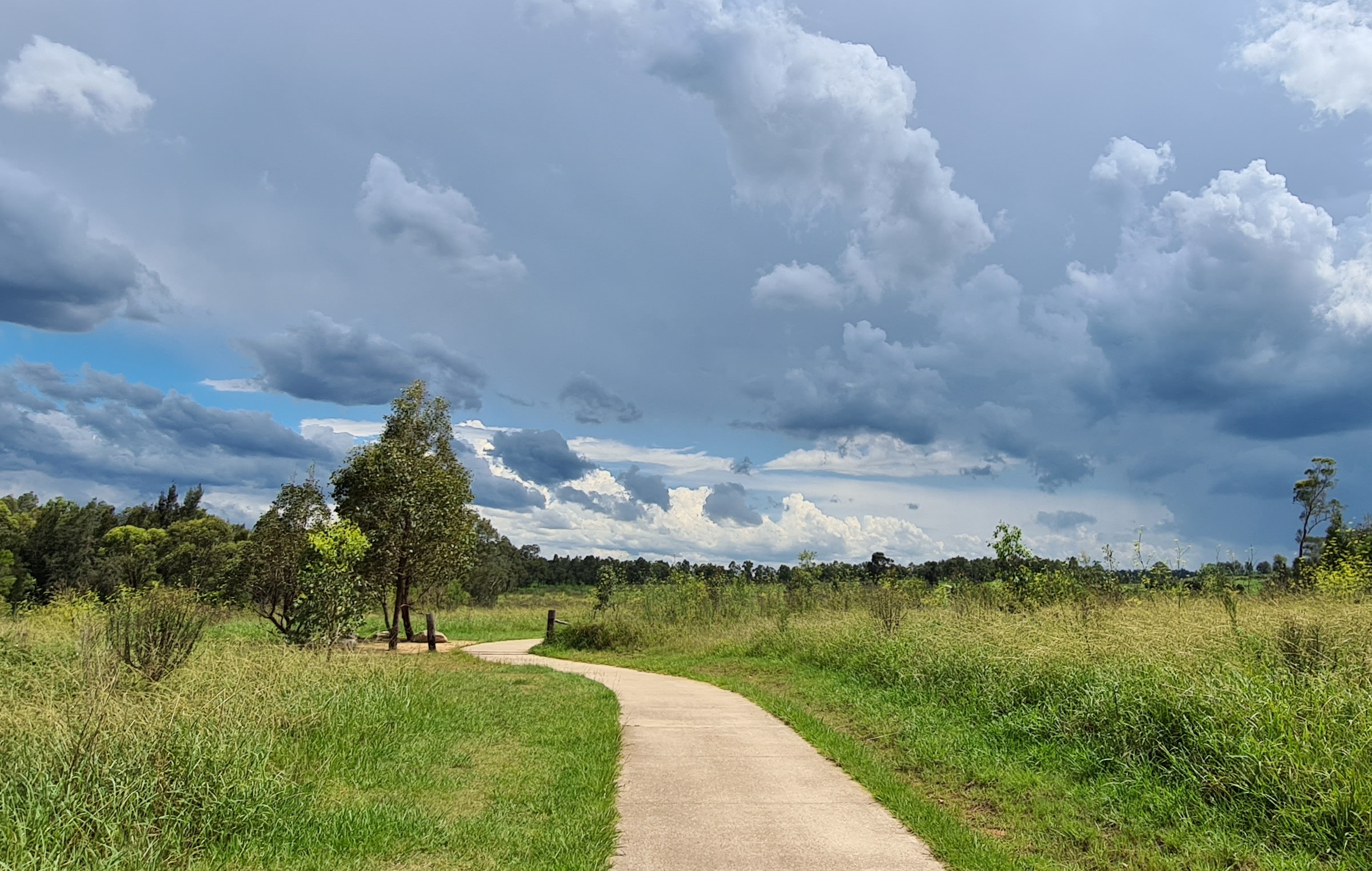
Walking path near Lizard Log

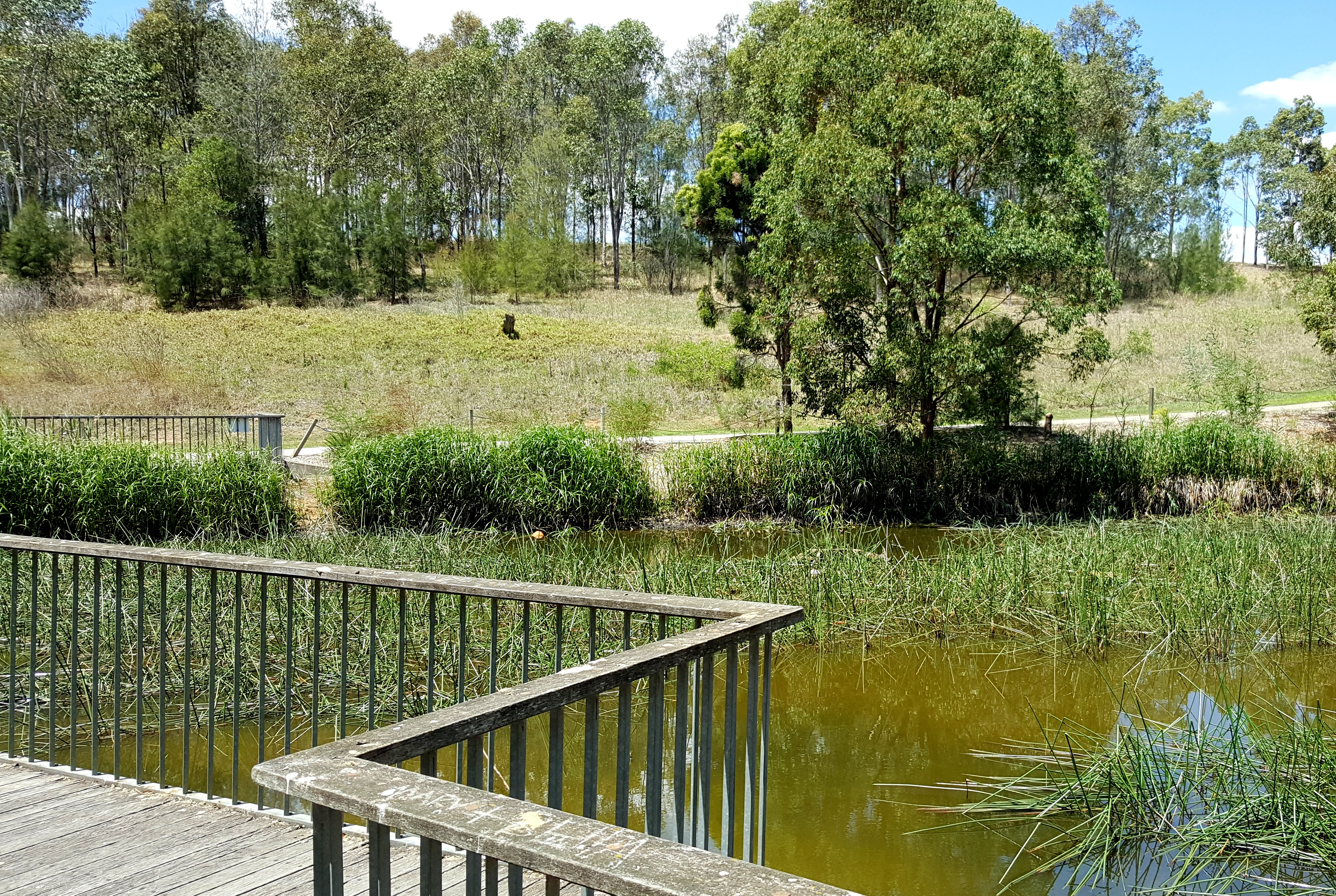
Looking over a swamp and woody grassland

== See also ==
- Western Sydney Parklands
- Prospect Nature Reserve
- Brenan Park
- Rosford Street Reserve
