= Prospect Nature Reserve =

Protected area in New South Wales, Australia

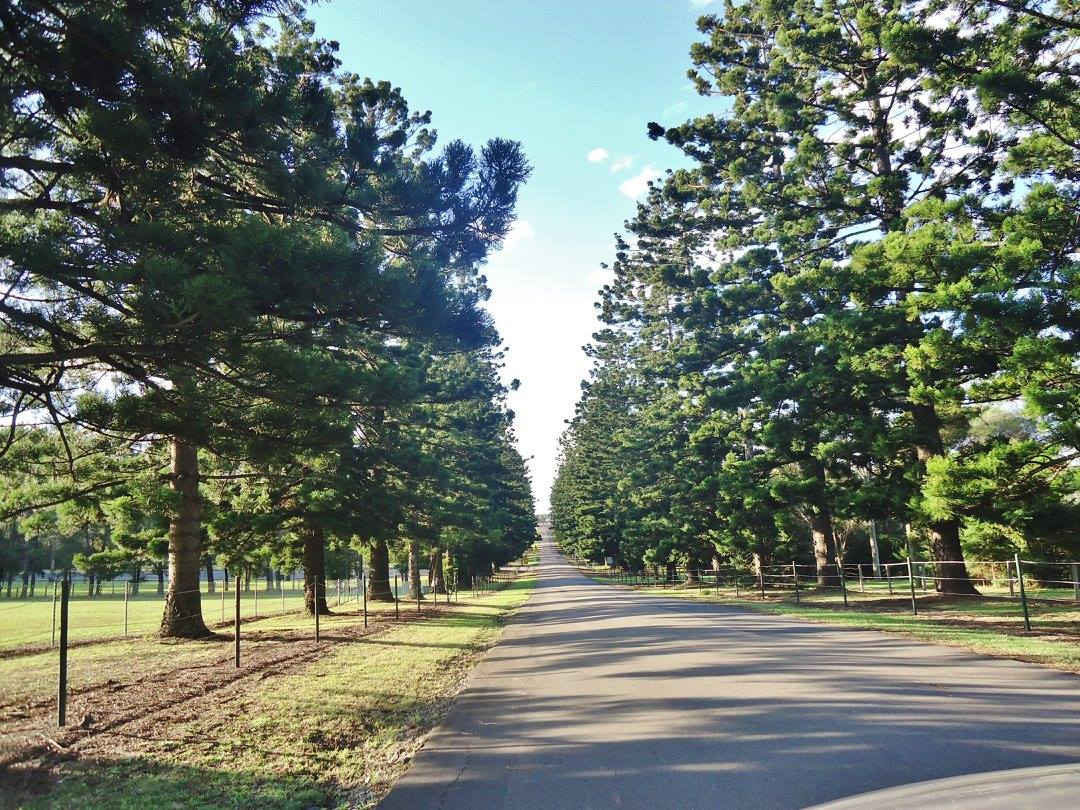
- Entrance to the reserve from William Lawson Drive
- Interactive map of Prospect Nature Reserve
- Type: Urban park, wildlife park, nature reserve
- Location: Prospect
- Coordinates: 33°48′40″S 150°53′11″E
- Area: 325.3 ha (804 acres)
- Elevation: 60–120 metres (197–394 ft)
- Owner: NSW National Parks and Wildlife Service
- Operator: Sydney Water
- Status: Open all year

Prospect Nature Reserve is a nature reserve and recreational area that is situated in the western suburbs of Sydney, New South Wales, Australia, which incorporates the Prospect Reservoir, and also features picnic spots, lookouts, walking tracks and BBQ areas within the Australian bush. It is located within the Blacktown City local government area, but is also close to the boundaries of Cumberland Council (to the east) and the City of Fairfield (to the south).

One of the largest reserves in Western Sydney, it was established on 28 February 2007, although the picnic areas have been open decades prior to that date. The reserve and its surroundings, including the Eastern Creek landscape, are of significant cultural worth to the Darug people, also having weighty scientific and educational values. From October 2013 to July 2015, the reserve was closed due to upgrades of the reservoir, which cost $13.7 million. Sydney Water owns and manages the picnic grounds at the reservoir.

== Ecology ==
=== Flora ===
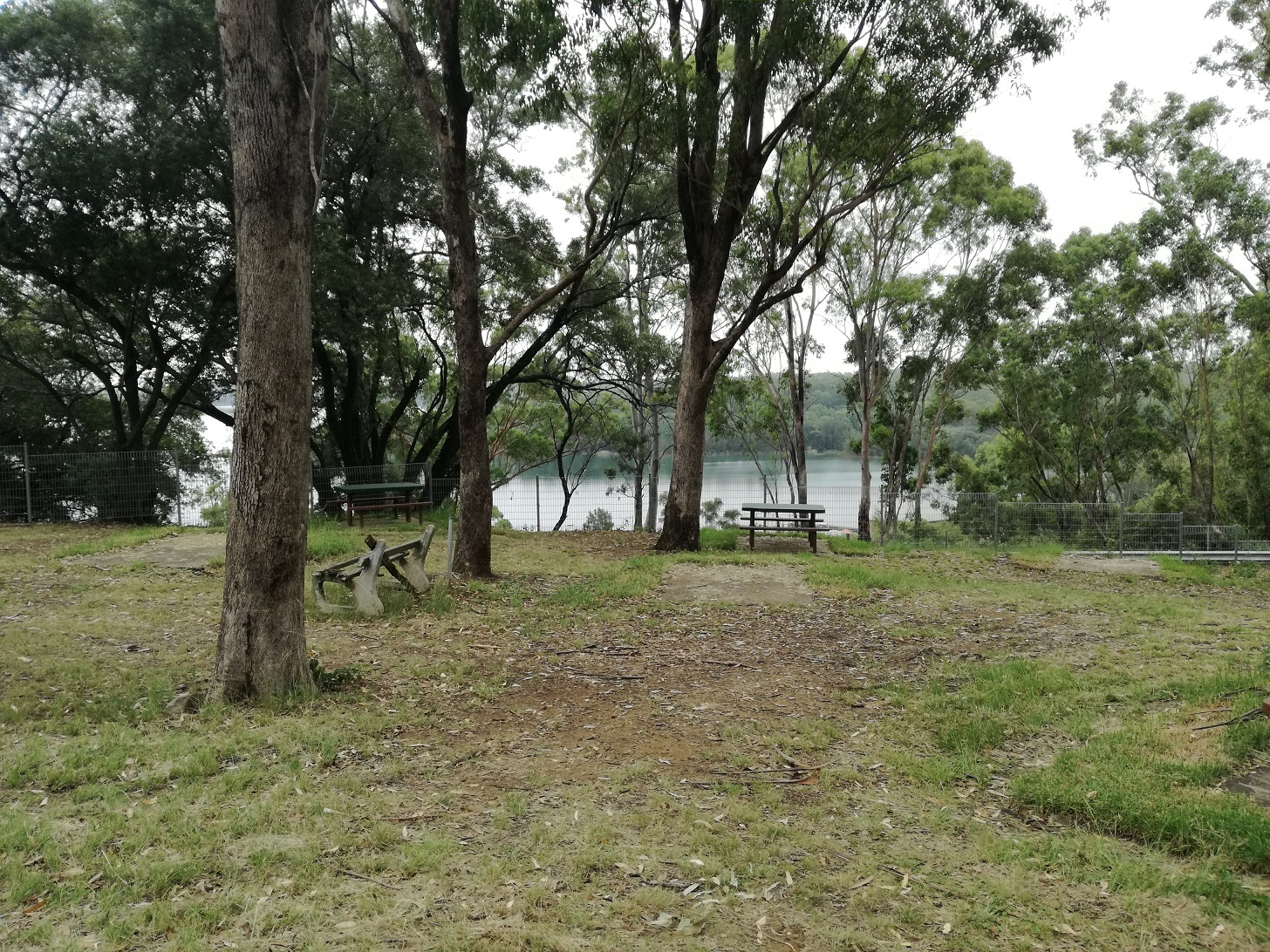
The bushland of the nature reserve

Situated within the eastern reaches of Western Sydney Parklands, the reserve contains remnants of Cumberland Plain Woodland that erstwhile occurred extensively in Western Sydney. It contains the largest area of grey box woodland within the Blacktown area, which comprises both the Shale Plains Woodland and Shale Hills Woodland elements of the Cumberland Plain. The vegetation condition varies from a young eucalypt canopy with a low diversity understorey to eucalypt regrowth in a largely exotic pasture. Other areas are exotic pastures with no native element present.

Other plant species in the area include, forest red gum (E. Tereticornis), spotted gum (Corymbia maculata), thin-leaf stringybark (E. eugenioides) narrow-leaved ironbark (E. Crebra), blackthorn (Bursaria spinosa), Pimelea spicata, Acacia pubescens, hickory (Acacia implexa), native indigo (Indigofera australis) and Dodonaea viscosa. Hoop pines are featured at the reserve's entrance.

Bushland condition is best in the northern section and decreases in the southern areas. A rapid flora survey of Prospect Reservoir (approximately 1 km North from spoil site) revealed over fifty native species. 7.6% to 11.5% of the original bushland of this community in 1750 still remains. Most vegetation of the Nature Reserve (about two thirds) is Shale Hills Woodland, reaching the northern limit on the Nature Reserve, with the remaining third being Shale Plains Woodland. Dominated by reed and rushes including Juncus spp, wetlands come about at the edge of the reservoir where they have formulated since inundation. The bushland near the filtration plant is less diverse and more degraded than in the immediately adjacent Sydney Catchment Authority land. A similar but much more restricted suite of native species can be found there. Exotic species including Chloris gayana (Rhodes grass), Setaria gracilis (pigeon grass) and Eragrostis curvula (African love grass) dominate. These species are indicators of significant soil disturbance.

Invasive species include African olive (Olea europaea subsp. Africana), moth plant (Araujia hortorum), large-leaved privet (Ligustrum lucidum), kikuyu (Pennisetum clandestinum), Rhodes grass (Chloris gayana) and African love grass (Eragrostis curvula), lantana (Lantana camara), blackberry (Rubus fruticosus), pampas grass (Cortaderia selloana), bridal creeper (Asparagus asparagoides), spiny rush (Juncus acutus) and arum lily (Zantedeschia aethiopica). Less than 13% of CPW remains and a high proportion of this figure is heavily degraded through weed invasion, rubbish dumping, illegal vehicle use and overgrazing. In the protected catchment these degrading influences are largely absent and this is reflected in the excellent bushland condition.

=== Fauna ===
Prospect Reservoir is an important refuge for many fauna species in Western Sydney. Mammals such as wombats, echidnas and eastern grey kangaroos are listed as recent sightings in the National Park species atlas. Importantly, over 12 species of bats (including threatened species) have been recorded within the vicinity of the reservoir.

Animals species in the reserve include a few bat, bird, and amphibians species, such as, Petaurus norfolcensis, Litoria aurea, Pteropus poliocephalus, Myotis macropus, Petaurus norfolcensis, Mormopterus norfolkensis, Falsistrellus tasmaniensis, Scoteanax rueppellii, Meridolum corneovirens, Lathamus discolor, Hieraaetus morphnoides, Tyto novaehollandiae and Daphoenositta chrysoptera. Introduced species include rabbits, foxes, deer, feral cat, horse, European hare, house mouse, feral goats and black rat.

== Geography ==
=== Precincts ===
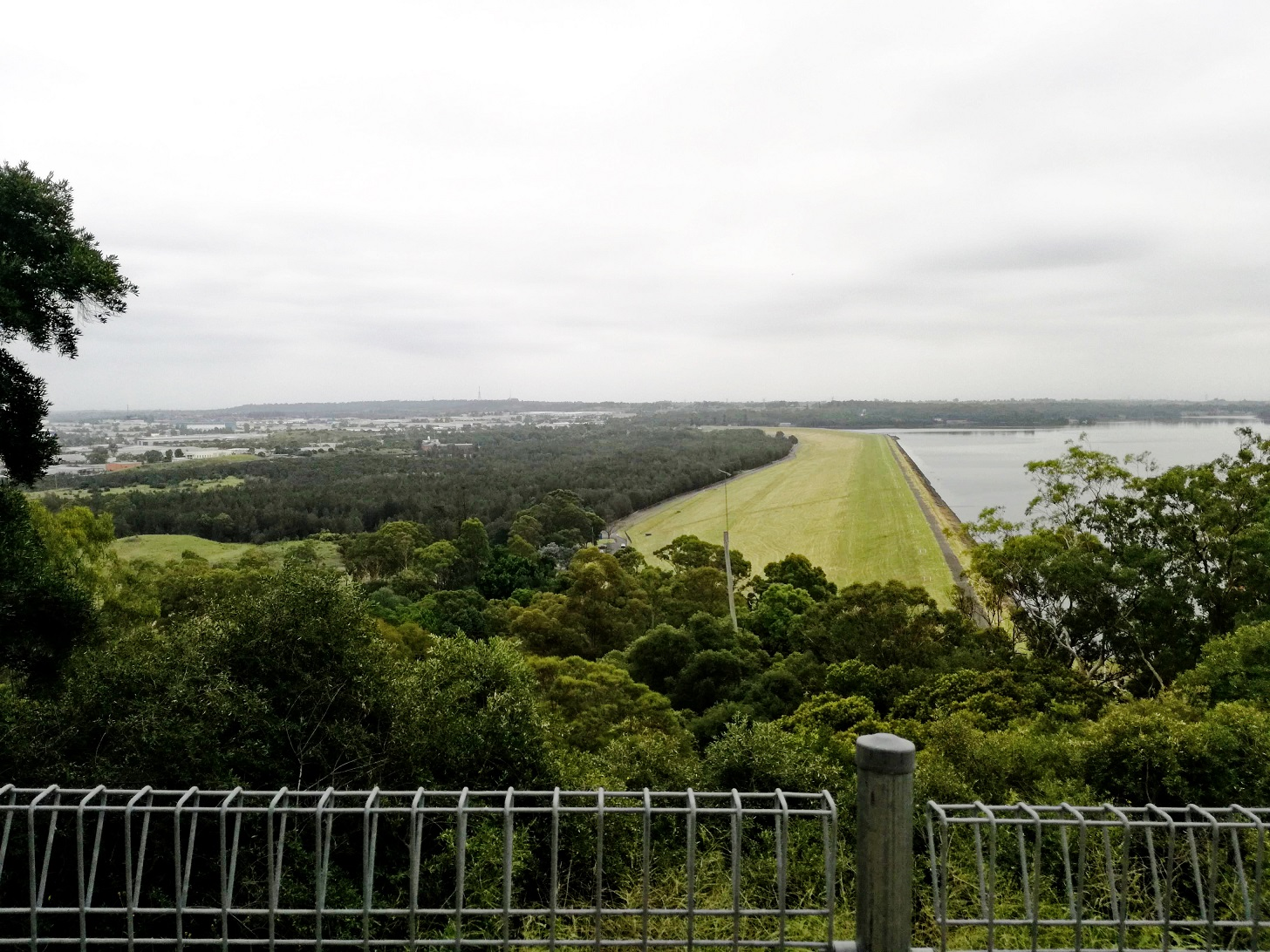
George Maunder lookout area (upper)

The reserve has a number of park precincts with picnic spots and BBQ, from north to south, on the eastern corridor of Prospect Reservoir:

- Andrew Campbell Reserve: Situated just at the entry area of the reservoir in the northern outskirts. Scattered with woods of scenic native trees and a dry sclerophyll forest to the west, this picnic spot features car parking and children's playground.
- George Maunder Park: Just adjacent to the reservoir, providing views of it, this section of the reserve features a long grassy field with some native eucalyptus trees and palm trees. The reservoir's valve house is situated here. To the west lies a steep mound, George Maunder Lookout area which has a lower and upper level lookout spots that provide unobstructed views of the reservoir and the Blue Mountains to the west. The lower lookout area is around 85 metres (279 ft) above sea level, and the upper area is 110 metres (360 ft). First opened for the public in the 1970s, both levels feature dozens of picnic tabletops, toilets and access to water. The upper lookout area was eventually closed for entry in the early 2000s due to construction of nearby factories in Prospect Highway, which included excavations on the hill. Consequently, the lower lookout area was also closed for vehicle access in 2009. After being abandoned for over a decade and left for decay, the George Maunder lookouts eventually reopened in 2019 after refurbishment, which included the replacement of damaged table seats, in addition to new barbecues, new signs, parking lines, and renovated toilet blocks.
- Walder Park: Situated at the southernmost region of the park, it sits close to the reservoir, but is recessed and thus would thereby block aesthetic views of the reservoir. It features picnic seats and a car park area that is proximate to the above precinct as well.

=== Geology ===
The land is made up of Wianamatta Shale, which heavily influences the soils and vegetation on reserve and is characterised by shallow to reasonably deep soils, including red and brown podzolic soils on the peaks, and yellow podzolic soils on lower slopes and in drainage lines. There is a small pocket of cleared land, that drains off-catchment within the north-eastern boundary of the Nature Reserve.

On the western slopes of George Maunder Lookout lies the Prospect dolerite intrusion, which is Sydney's largest body of igneous rock, that formed in the Early Jurassic after a volcanic activity where hot magmatic fluids moved through developing pegmatite and depositing prehnite, calcite and other secondary minerals found in the upper part of the intrusion. The eroded residue of the volcanic core forms the hill (or the laccolith) that is the George Maunder Lookout (and as well as the rest of Prospect Hill just the west of the Reserve), which was battered down over millions of years to a small jut in the generally flat lands of western Sydney.

== Access ==
The reservoir is accessed by William Lawson Drive from Reservoir Road, which can be entered from Western Motorway to the north or Prospect Highway to the southeast. The reserve is located 10 km (6.2 mi) west of Parramatta and 5 km (3.1 mi) south of Blacktown, and is bounded by Reen and Reservoir Roads to the north, Ferrers Road to the west, and Prospect Reservoir to the south. There is also a cycleway leading to the reserve that is accessed from Prospect Highway, at the park's southern vicinity, which trails just south of the reservoir to Westlink M7.

The Prospect Reservoir is open to public during the week and weekend (but not on public holidays) from 6:00 AM to 6:30 PM during daylight saving time and from 7:00 AM to 4:30 PM during non daylight saving time.

== Heritage listing ==
Prospect Reservoir and its nature reserve was listed on the New South Wales State Heritage Register on 18 November 1999 having satisfied the following criteria.

The place possesses uncommon, rare or endangered aspects of the cultural or natural history of New South Wales.

This item is assessed as historically rare statewide. This item is assessed as scientifically rare statewide.

The place is important in demonstrating the principal characteristics of a class of cultural or natural places/environments in New South Wales.

This item is assessed as aesthetically representative locally.

== Gallery ==
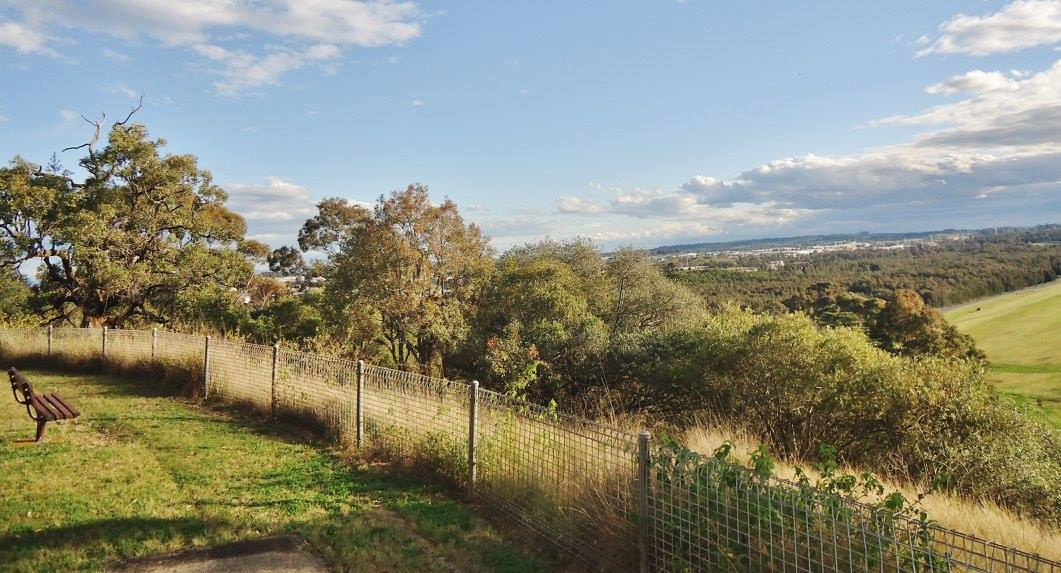
George Maunder lookout area (lower level)

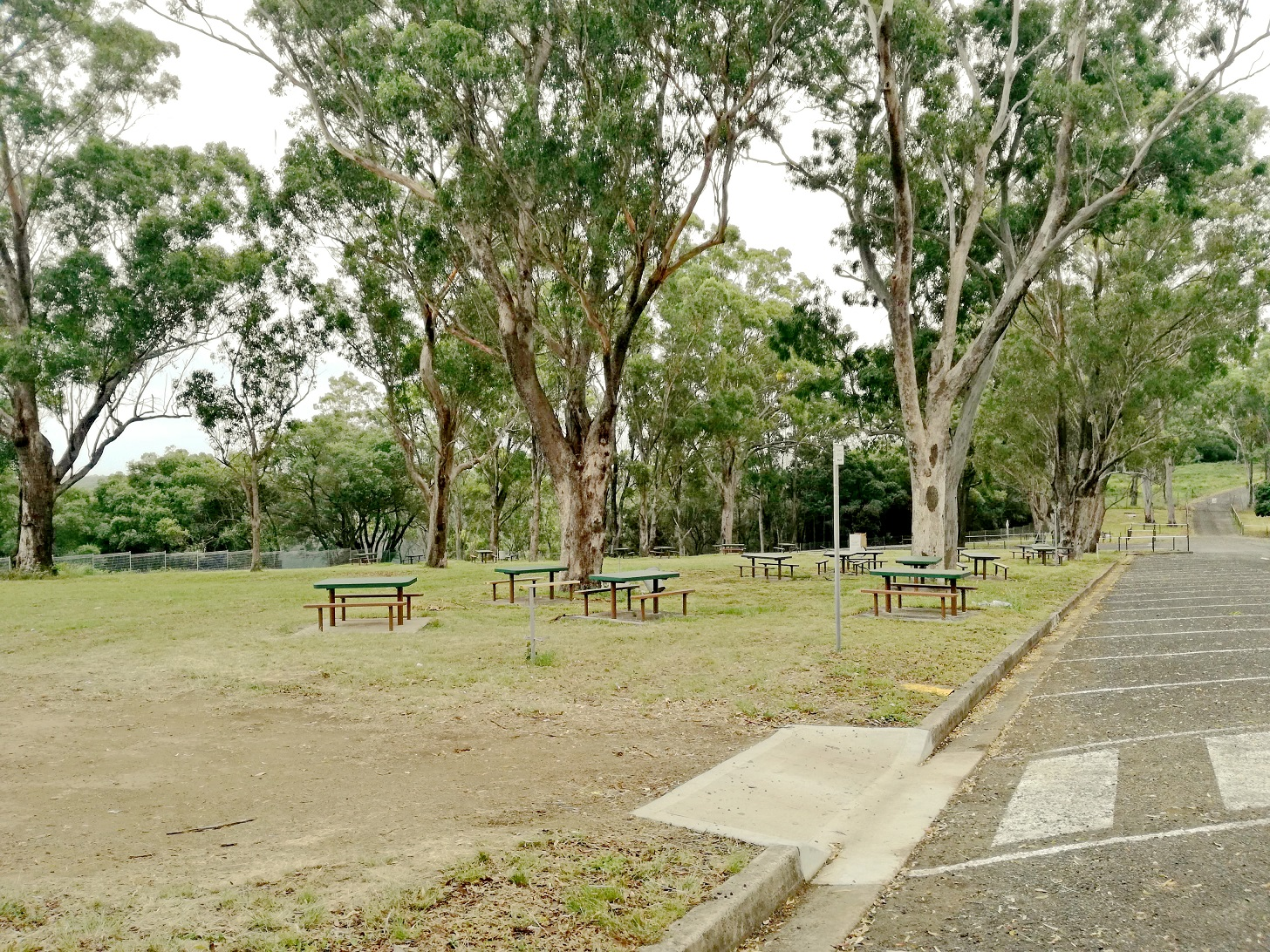
Upper Level picnic benches

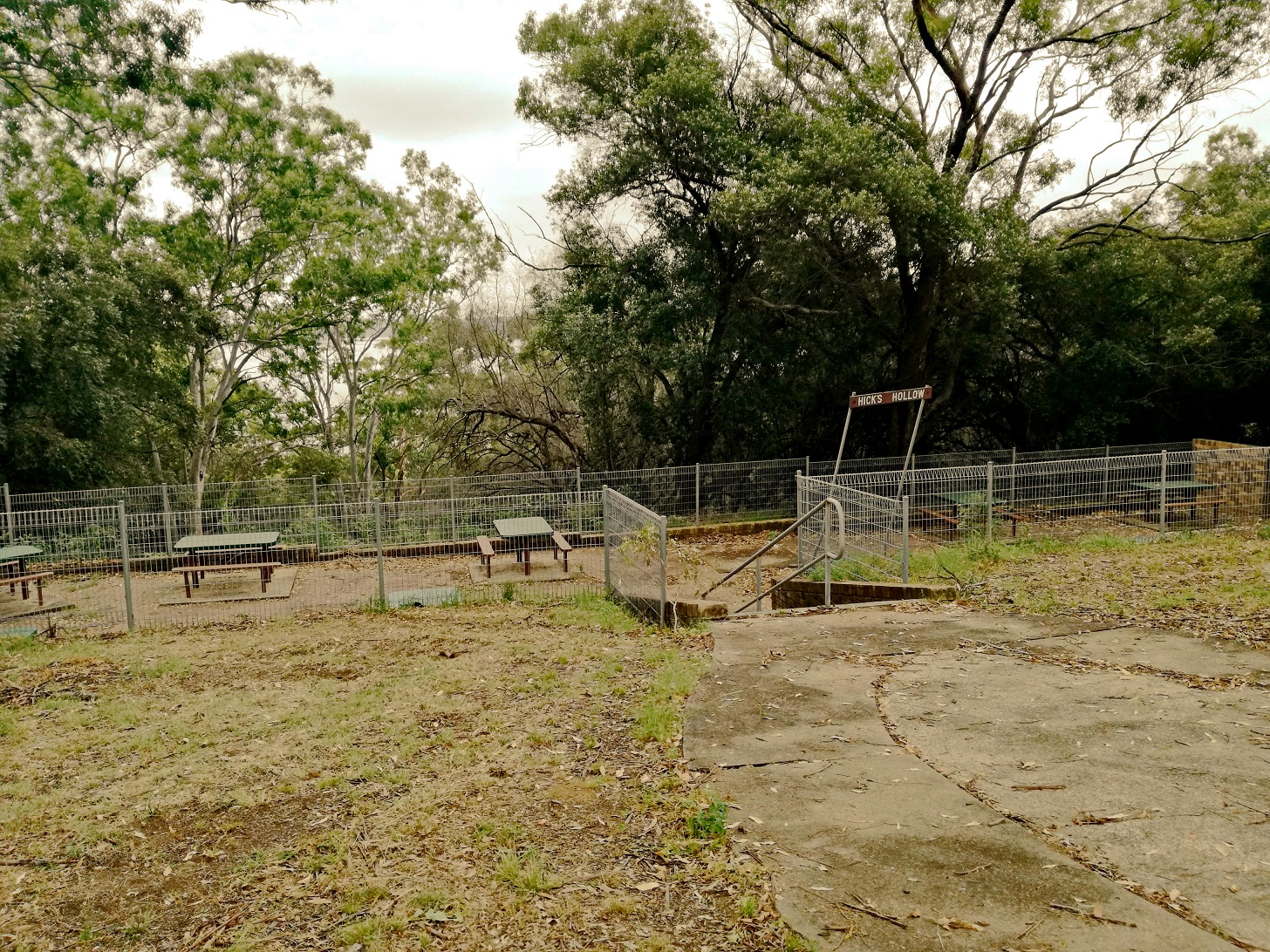
Hick's Hollow picnic benches

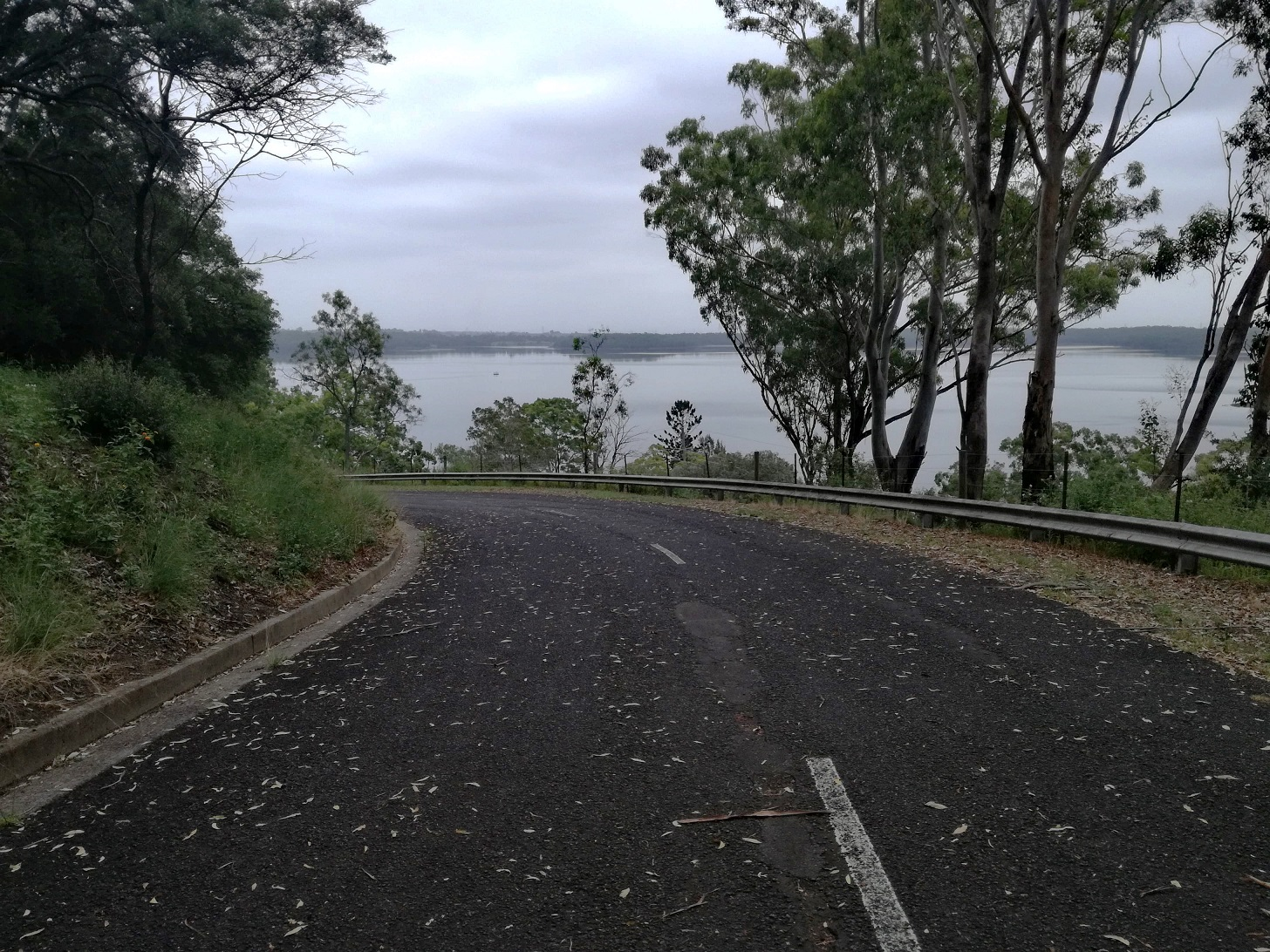
The road leading to the George Maunder lookout areas

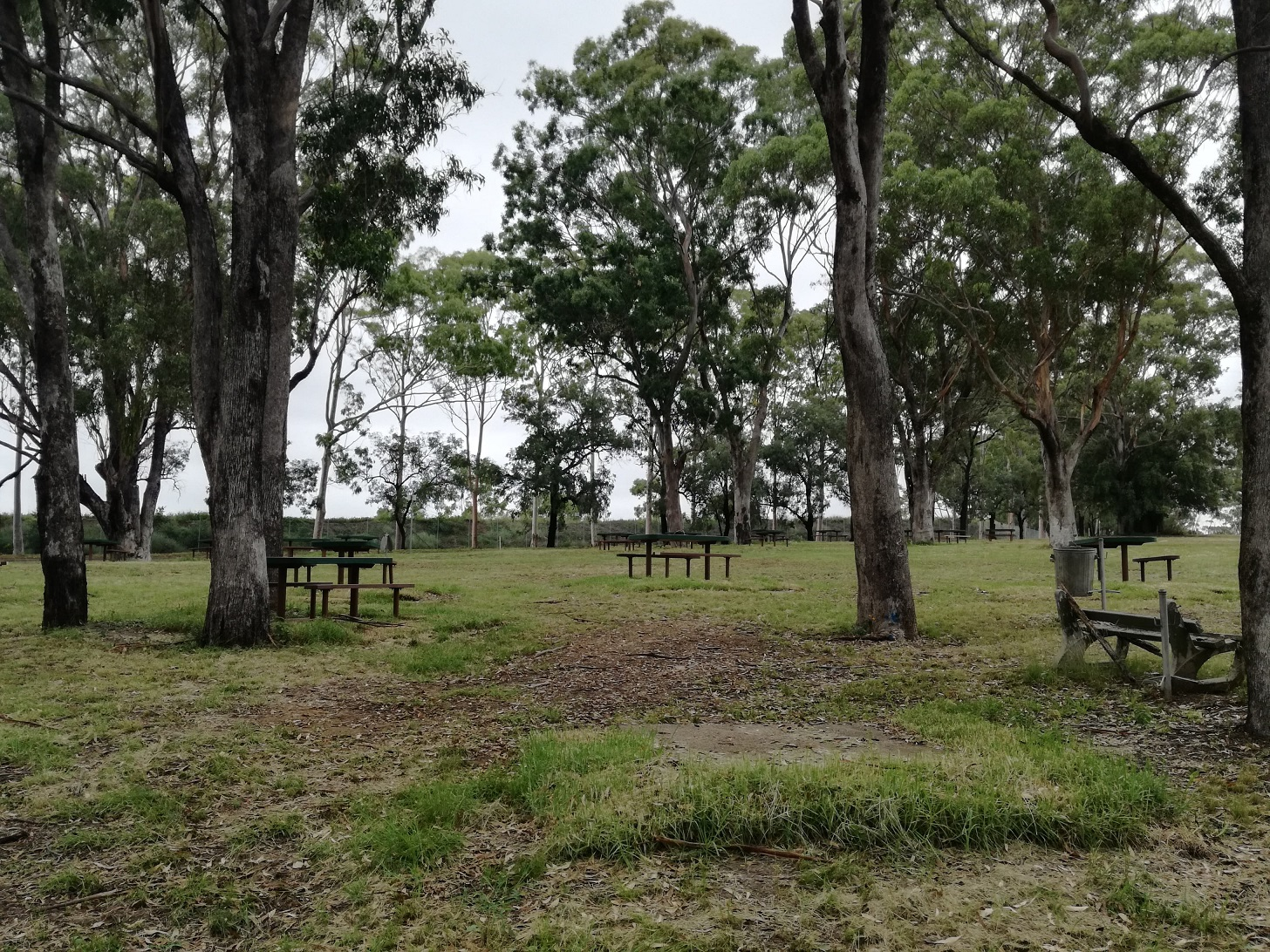
More picnic benches at Upper George Maunder lookout area

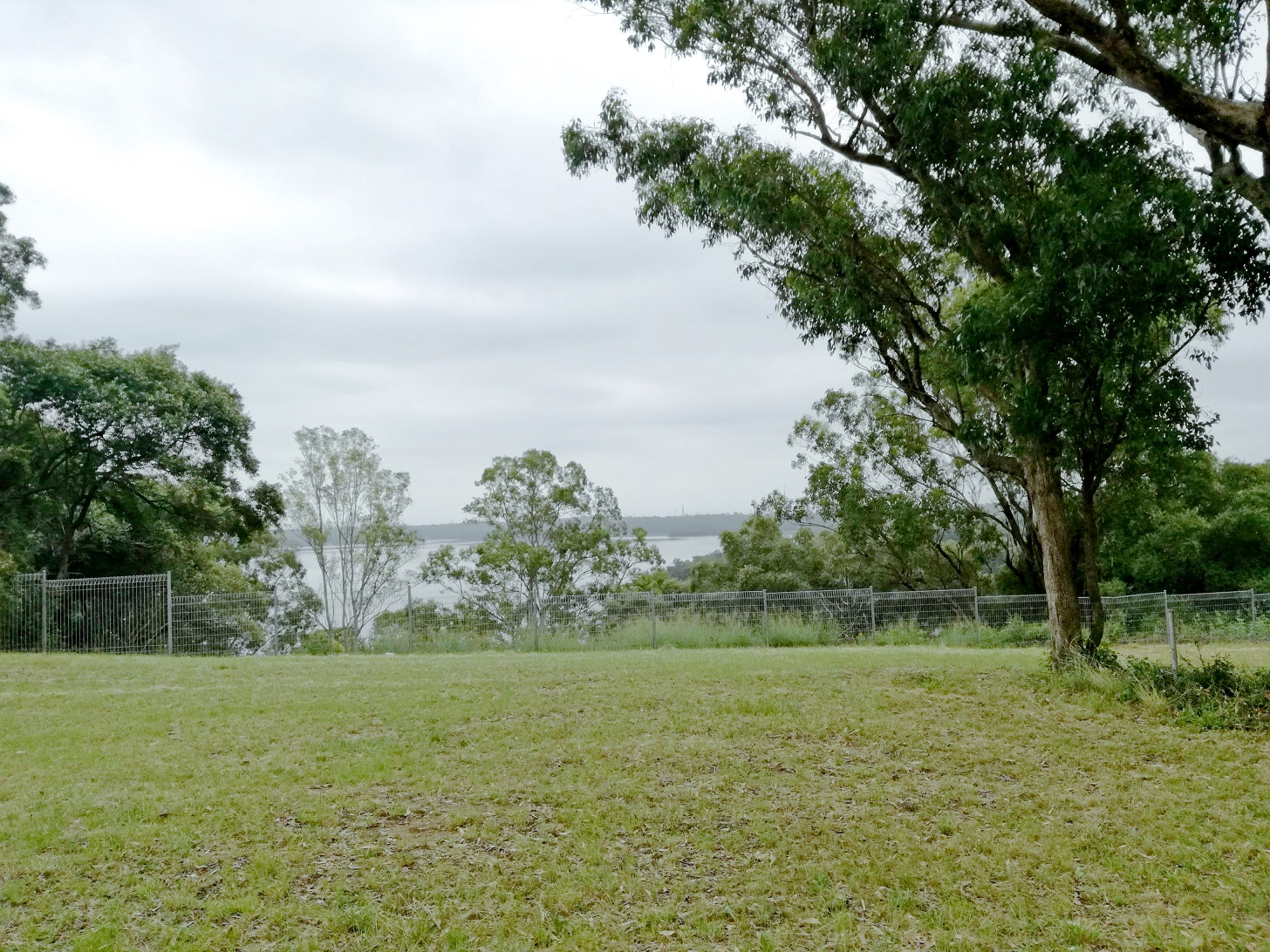
George Maunder Upper Level open grass fields

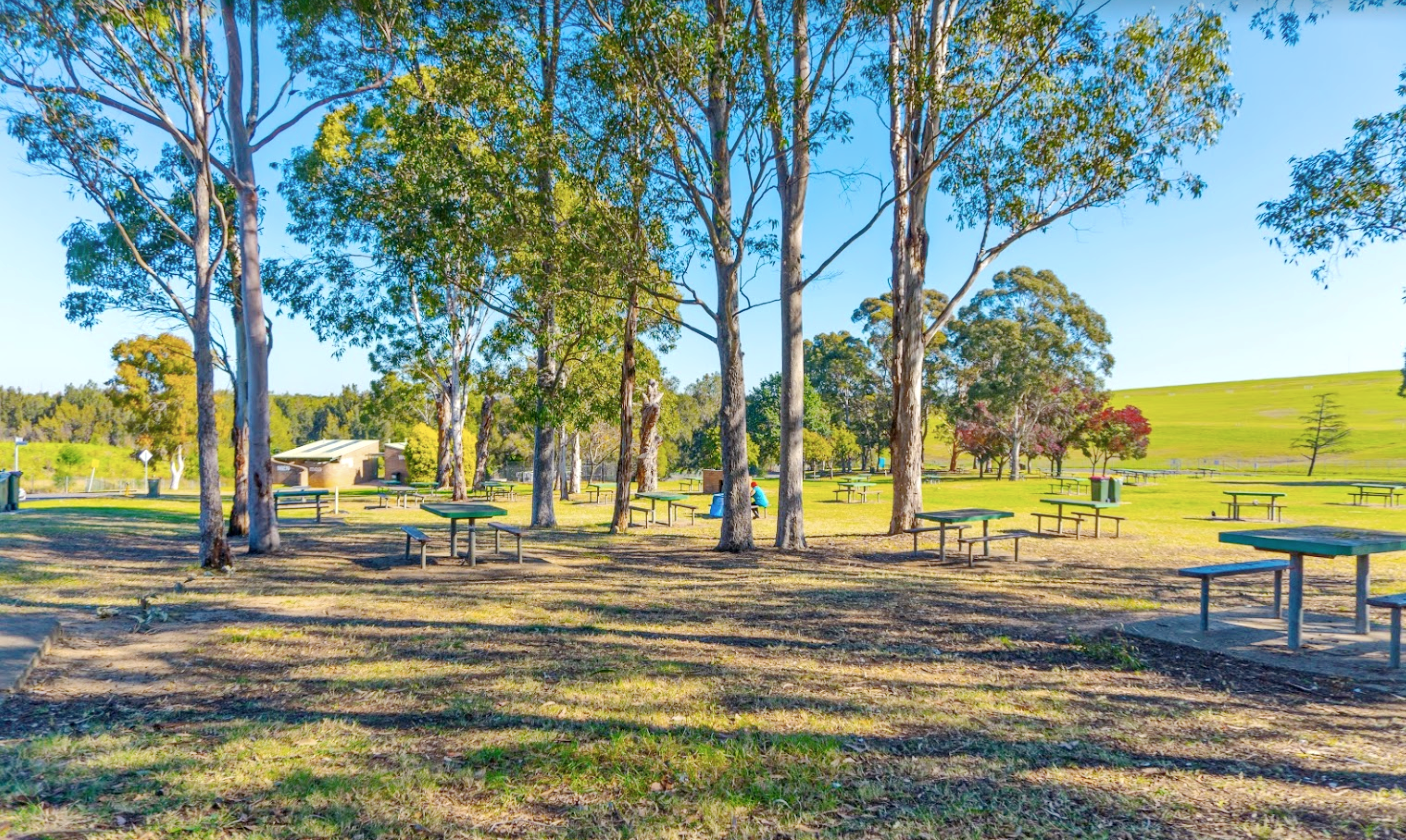
Walder Park

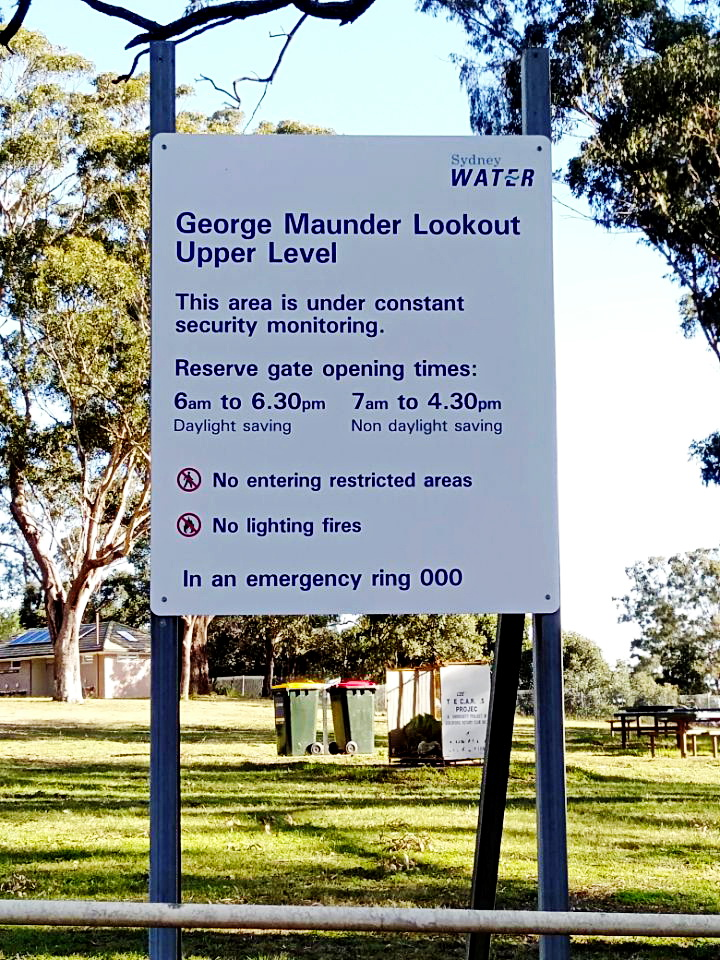
George Maunder Upper level lookout sign by Sydney Water

== See also ==
- Prospect Reservoir
- Prospect Hill
- Rosford Street Reserve
- Western Sydney Regional Park
- Grey Box Reserve
- Marrong Reserve
