= Calmsley Hill City Farm =

Farm in New South Wales, Australia

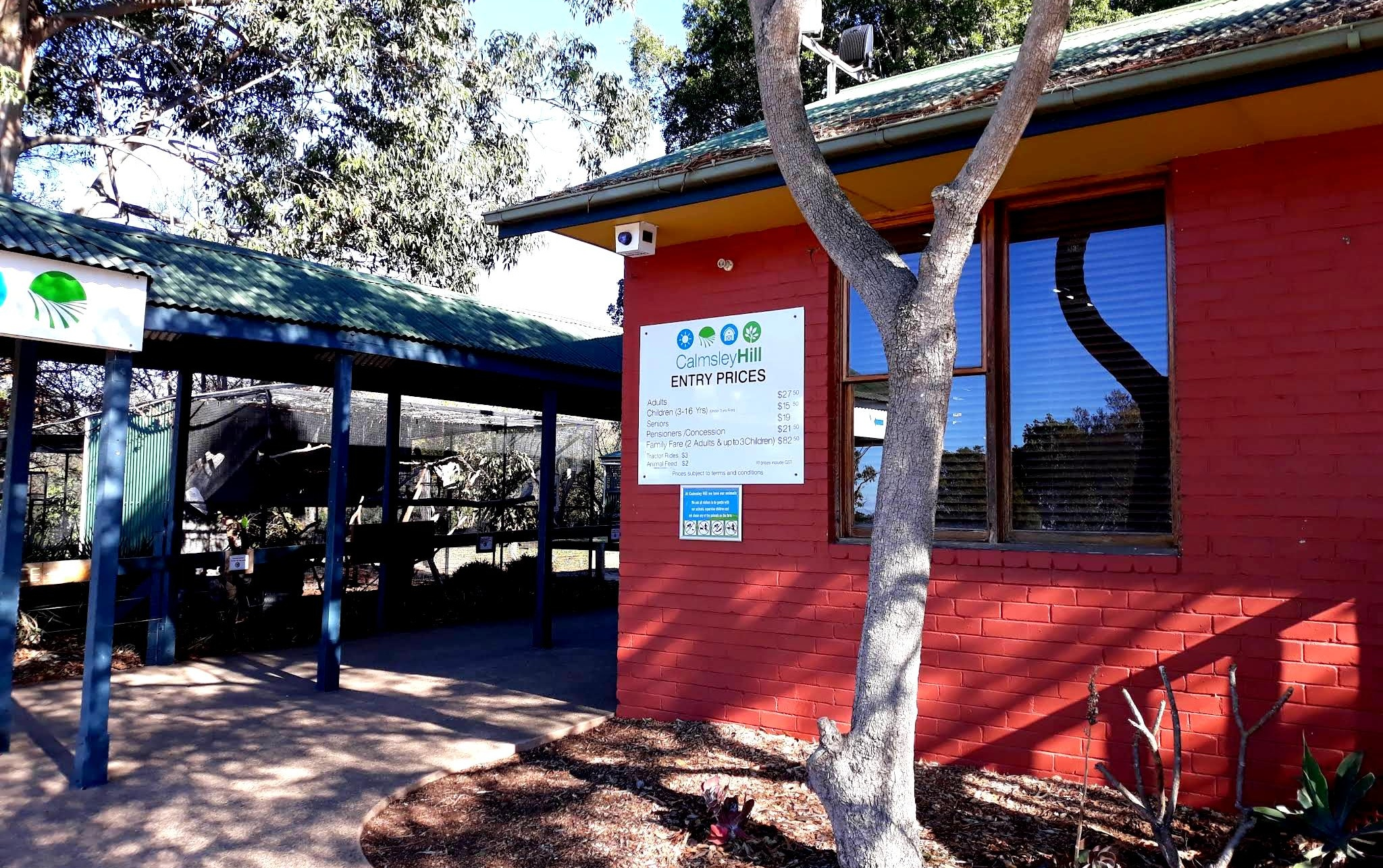
- The entry area
- Interactive map of Calmsley Hill City Farm
- Town/City: 31 Darling Street, Abbotsbury, New South Wales, Australia
- Coordinates: 33.86872°S 150.85973°E
- Established: 1984
- Owner: Fairfield City Council
- Area: 400 hectares (990 acres)
- Status: Open to the public
- Website: calmsleyhill.com.au

Calmsley Hill City Farm is an interactive farm, a zoo and tourist attraction at Abbotsbury in Western Sydney, New South Wales, Australia. Located within the Western Sydney Parklands, the farm provides visitors with access to farm and native Australian animals, agricultural demonstrations, educational programs and recreational facilities. The site occupies land with a history of agricultural use dating to the early 19th century and was formerly known as Fairfield City Farm.

== Location ==
Calmsley Hill City Farm is located at 31 Darling Street in Abbotsbury, on the western outskirts of the City of Fairfield. The farm forms part of the Western Sydney Parklands, a large network of open space extending across Western Sydney. Western Sydney Regional Park surrounds the site and provides connections to walking and cycling routes, including the Prospect Reservoir cycleway. The site has a semi-rural landscape despite being surrounded by the expanding suburbs of Western Sydney. Its location provides access to the Western Sydney Parklands while retaining agricultural uses and open paddocks associated with the former farm.

== History ==
=== Early history and farming ===
Before European settlement, the area was associated with the Dharug people. In 1806, Scottish immigrant and government stock superintendent John Jamieson received an 80-hectare land grant at the site, which he named Coulmesly Hill. Further grants increased the property by another 160 hectares in 1809 and 1823. Cattle and sheep were subsequently grazed on the property. Three huts and a dairy were constructed on the farm in 1826. The property subsequently passed through several owners, including John Dengate, Patrick James Cashman, James Clarke, Robert McIntyre and John Maurice Garnock. In 1934, the property was purchased by Edward Dryland Horden, a member of the Horden family of Sydney merchants. Two trees on the present farm, a peppercorn tree and a Moreton Bay fig, were likely planted during the Horden family's ownership.

=== Big Brother Movement ===
In 1947, Calmsley Hill was purchased by the Big Brother Movement, an organisation established to assist young British migrants settling in Australia. The property became a reception and training centre for groups of up to 40 young men, who were taught agricultural skills before entering employment in rural areas.

The organisation expanded agricultural production at Calmsley Hill, establishing a dairy herd, piggery, poultry farm, orchard and irrigated market garden. A steel water tower constructed during this period remains on the site. The property continued to operate as a training farm until the Big Brother Movement disposed of most of the land in 1972. The property was subsequently acquired by the State Planning Authority and incorporated into the Horsley Park Services Corridor, which was developed to accommodate major electricity, gas and water infrastructure for Western Sydney. Parts of the former farm continued to be leased for agricultural purposes.

=== Fairfield City Farm ===
In 1984, Fairfield City Council took up a lease over the property and established Fairfield City Farm, which operated educational programs for schools and visitors. A soil conservation education program was introduced in 1989, followed by the opening of a City Landcare garden in 1995. The garden is now commonly known as the Permaculture Garden. The farm was used as a venue during the 2000 Summer Olympics in Sydney, when the mountain biking competition was held at the site. The event formed part of the wider Olympic mountain-bike course within Western Sydney. In 2009, the City Farm entered into a lease agreement with the Western Sydney Parklands Trust, and the site adopted the name Calmsley Hill City Farm.

== Facilities and activities ==
Calmsley Hill City Farm operates as an interactive working farm, allowing visitors to encounter a variety of farmyard and native Australian animals. Activities include animal feeding and patting, farm demonstrations, tractor rides and educational presentations. The farm's regular demonstrations include cow milking, sheep shearing, working dogs and stock-whip demonstrations, as well as presentations about native animals such as koalas.

The farm provides educational programs for school groups, with resources and activities organised for several stages of the New South Wales education system. Visitor facilities include picnic areas, electric barbecues, a kiosk, paved paths and accessible facilities. The farm also hosts children's birthday parties, community events and other functions.

== Community and events ==
Calmsley Hill City Farm has been used by Fairfield City Council for community events. It has hosted Fairfield City's New Year's Eve Illuminate celebrations, including a family-oriented event featuring entertainment, amusement rides, food stalls and fireworks. In 2017, more than 3,300 people attended the council's family site at the farm during the Illuminate celebrations.

The farm has also hosted Fairfield City Council's annual Grandparents Day, attracting hundreds of grandparents, parents and children for activities including animal feeding, sheep shearing, tractor rides and community services.

== See also ==
- Western Sydney Parklands
- Western Sydney Regional Park
