= Abbotsbury, New South Wales =

Abbotsbury
- Suburb
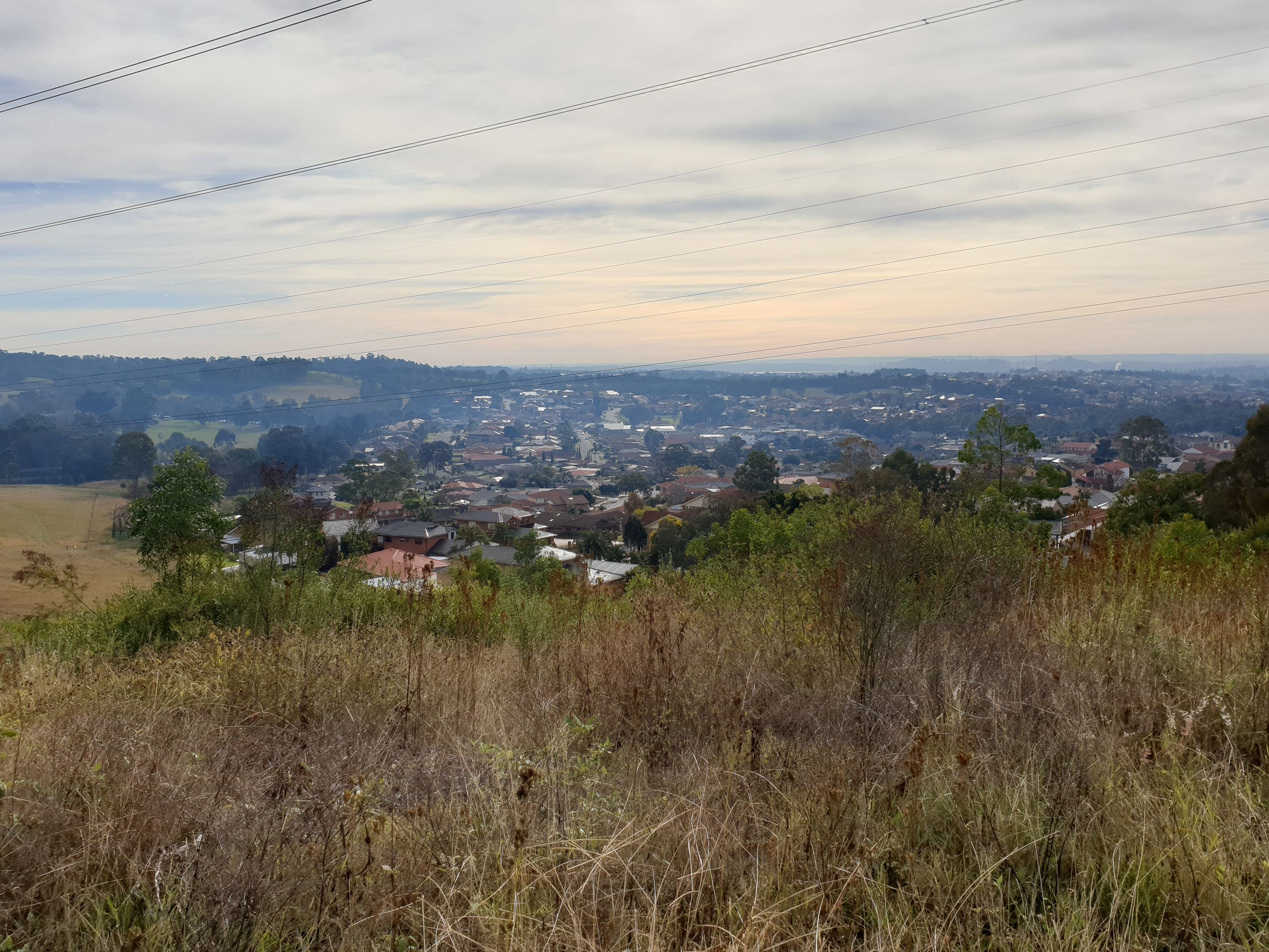
- View of Abbotsbury from Western Sydney Parklands

- Interactive map of Abbotsbury
- Coordinates: 33°52′11″S 150°51′53″E
- Country: Australia
- State: New South Wales
- City: Sydney
- LGA: City of Fairfield
- Location: 39 km (24 mi) west of Sydney CBD

Government
  - State electorates: Badgerys Creek; Cabramatta
  - Federal divisions: Fowler; McMahon

Area
  - Total: 1.3 km^{2} (0.50 sq mi)
- Elevation: 61 m (200 ft)

Population
  - Total: 4,253 (2021 census)
  - Density: 3,270/km^{2} (8,500/sq mi)
- Postcode: 2176
Suburbs around Abbotsbury
Horsley Park	Horsley Park	Bossley Park
Cecil Park	Abbotsbury	Edensor Park
Cecil Hills	Cecil Park	Bonnyrigg Heights

Abbotsbury is a suburb of Sydney, New South Wales, Australia 39 kilometres west of the Sydney central business district in the local government area of the City of Fairfield. Abbotsbury is part of the Greater Western Sydney region. Most of the suburb's estates were built in the late 1980s and early 1990s, although a few acres of undeveloped land in the north-west area was subdivided and developed in the early 2010s.

The western border of the suburb is delineated by a line of pine trees, which gives privacy to the homes backing onto the farmlands. Abbotsbury is best known for Calmsley Hill City Farm, which is located on the western side of the suburb. Abbotsbury is a leafy suburb due to the presence of Western Sydney Regional Park (part of Western Sydney Parklands), which features many picnic areas and shade trees. (Note: Although Domain Group lists Wetherill Park as a leafy suburb, it is worth noting that the parks mentioned are actually located in Abbotsbury.)

== History ==
Abbotsbury was named from Major Edward Abbott, a Canadian-born soldier who arrived in New South Wales in 1790. Abbott was granted land in what is now Abbotsbury in 1806 although sold it to William Browne in 1810. The estate remained intact until the late 19th century when it was subdivided into small farms and it remained a rural area until the early 80s when AVJennings Plan A residential subdivision on the Estate Work Later began. In 1816, Abbotsbury had several Anglo-Indian settlers, including their Indian servants who worked in the area up until the 1850s. Browne developed the areas as a sheep and horse breeding property, which expanded his stock interests, before selling the land in 1831. The name for the suburb was approved in 1984.

== Demographics ==
According to the 2021 census, there were 4,200 residents in Abbotsbury. 61.0% of residents were born in Australia. The most common countries of birth were Iraq 9.3%, Italy 3.4%, Vietnam 3.0%, Philippines 1.5% and Croatia 1.5%.

The most common ancestries were Italian 23.0%, Australian 14.4%, English 9.0%, Assyrian 7.5% and Croatian 6.6%.

50.4% of people only spoke English at home. Other languages spoken at home included Assyrian Neo-Aramaic 6.5%, Italian 5.8%, Arabic 5.1%, Chaldean Neo-Aramaic 5.0% and Vietnamese 3.9%. Noting that Assyrian and Chaldean Neo-Aramaic form two dialects of one language, the total percentage of Neo-Aramaic speakers totals to 11.5%.

The most common responses for religion were Catholic 53.2%, No Religion 8.8%, Eastern Orthodox 7.2%, Islam 4.5% and Assyrian Church of the East 4.2%. Overall, Christianity was the largest religious group reported overall (79.7%).

== Transport ==
Abbotsbury is serviced by the region three bus operator Transit Systems. The 808 and 806 buses come through here. The most common form of transport used by residents is private vehicle.

== Sport and recreation ==
In the north-west of the suburb lies the Western Sydney Parklands, which sits on a hilly ridge. On these large hills there are a few recreational spots, such as Moonrise Lookout and Sugarloaf Ridge. They are both adjacent to each other and would feature a panoramic view of all of Sydney, where the city skyline may be seen from there. Families enjoy to picnic and walk in these area, and even come here to view the new years fireworks from Sydney Harbour.

The Western Sydney cycling path passes through Abbotsbury. Stretching far along Western Sydney, the cycling path passes through the Calmsley Hill City Farm (previously known as Fairfield City Farm), which is located at the Western Sydney Regional Park. Calmsley Hill City Farm was used during the 2000 Sydney Olympics for the mountain biking events. The biking tracks remain.

The suburb also has a sporting field named Stockdale Reserve. It is mainly used for soccer cricket and rugby league, depending on the time of year. Adjacent to this park, there are several ponds, home to many species of birds, mainly ducks. Within the Reserve is a shared pathway for pedestrians and cyclists.

== Housing ==
In 2015, the median sale price of houses in the area was $1,198,750. Abbotsbury contains some large properties on the outskirts, some blocks reaching sizes over half of an acre, which is rare to find in the suburbs of Sydney. Withers Place, located in the north of Abbotsbury, is the most expensive and affluent with a median price of $2,700,000.

== Climate ==
Abbotsbury has a humid subtropical climate (Cfa) with warm to hot summers and cool winters. Much of the precipitation is observed in the first four months of the year, with the middle of the year recording lesser rainfall in comparison.

Climate data for Horsley Park (Sydney International Equestrian Centre)
Month	Jan	Feb	Mar	Apr	May	Jun	Jul	Aug	Sep	Oct	Nov	Dec	Year
Record high °C (°F)	47.0 (116.6)	46.4 (115.5)	40.5 (104.9)	35.9 (96.6)	28.1 (82.6)	24.7 (76.5)	27.3 (81.1)	28.4 (83.1)	36.0 (96.8)	37.5 (99.5)	42.0 (107.6)	44.4 (111.9)	47.0 (116.6)
Mean daily maximum °C (°F)	30.0 (86.0)	28.6 (83.5)	26.7 (80.1)	23.9 (75.0)	20.6 (69.1)	17.6 (63.7)	17.4 (63.3)	19.1 (66.4)	22.4 (72.3)	24.8 (76.6)	26.4 (79.5)	28.4 (83.1)	23.8 (74.8)
Mean daily minimum °C (°F)	18.0 (64.4)	17.8 (64.0)	16.1 (61.0)	12.9 (55.2)	9.1 (48.4)	7.2 (45.0)	5.8 (42.4)	6.4 (43.5)	9.3 (48.7)	11.8 (53.2)	14.4 (57.9)	16.2 (61.2)	12.1 (53.8)
Record low °C (°F)	10.6 (51.1)	10.4 (50.7)	7.2 (45.0)	1.9 (35.4)	1.0 (33.8)	−1.8 (28.8)	−2.3 (27.9)	−0.5 (31.1)	0.7 (33.3)	3.6 (38.5)	6.6 (43.9)	9.0 (48.2)	−2.3 (27.9)
Average precipitation mm (inches)	74.3 (2.93)	124.5 (4.90)	94.5 (3.72)	69.2 (2.72)	44.7 (1.76)	71.3 (2.81)	38.4 (1.51)	39.1 (1.54)	36.4 (1.43)	60.8 (2.39)	78.8 (3.10)	66.2 (2.61)	780.3 (30.72)
Average precipitation days (≥ 1 mm)	7.8	7.6	8.8	6.7	5.2	6.4	5.0	4.0	4.7	5.9	7.2	7.2	76.5
Average relative humidity (%)	49	53	54	53	52	55	50	42	42	45	50	48	49
Source: Bureau of Meteorology
