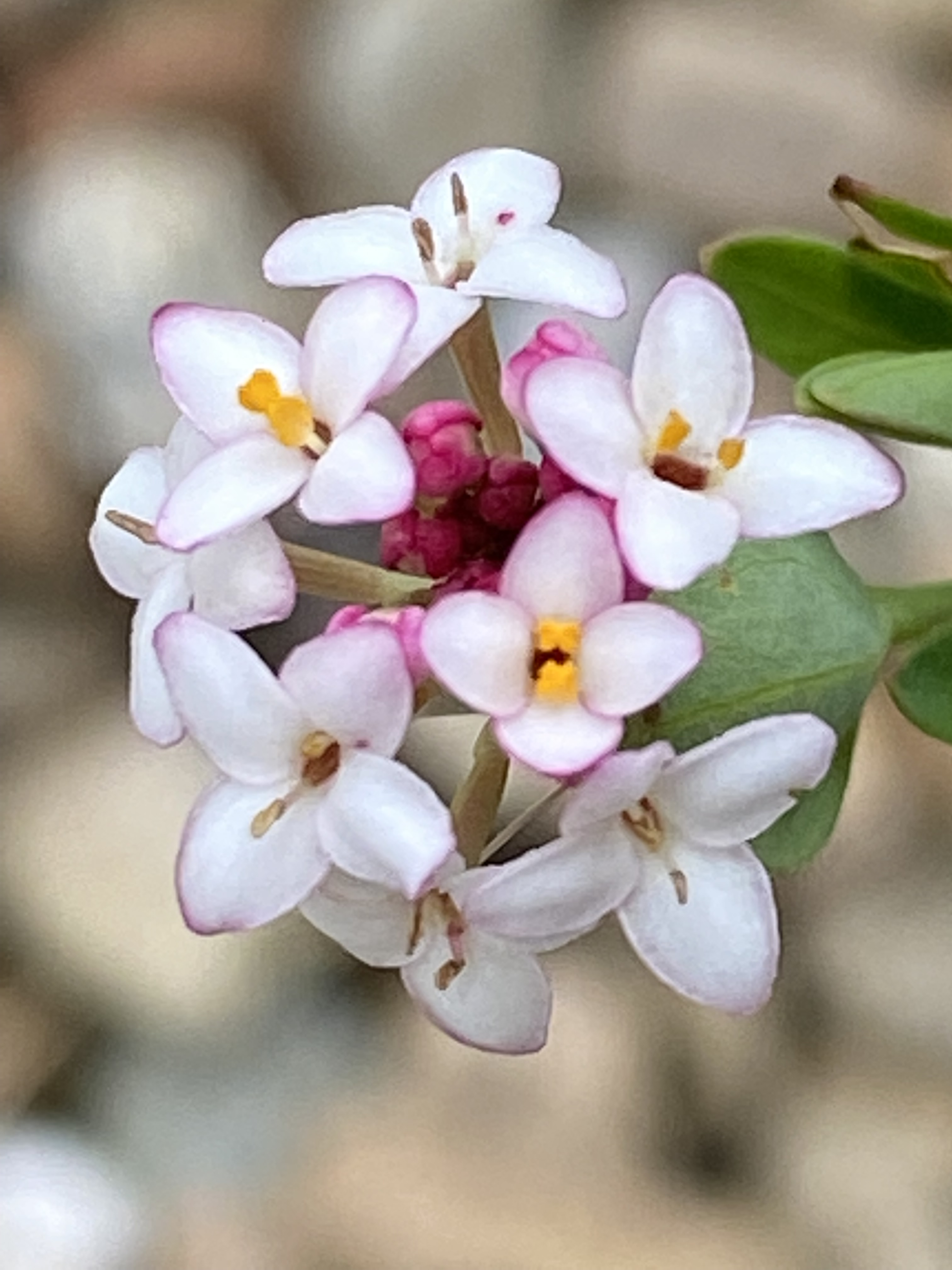

Conservation status
- Endangered (EPBC Act)

Scientific classification
- Kingdom: Plantae
- Clade: Tracheophytes
- Clade: Angiosperms
- Clade: Eudicots
- Clade: Rosids
- Order: Malvales
- Family: Thymelaeaceae
- Genus: Pimelea
- Species: P. spicata

Binomial name
- Pimelea spicata R.Br.

= Pimelea spicata =

Species of flowering plant

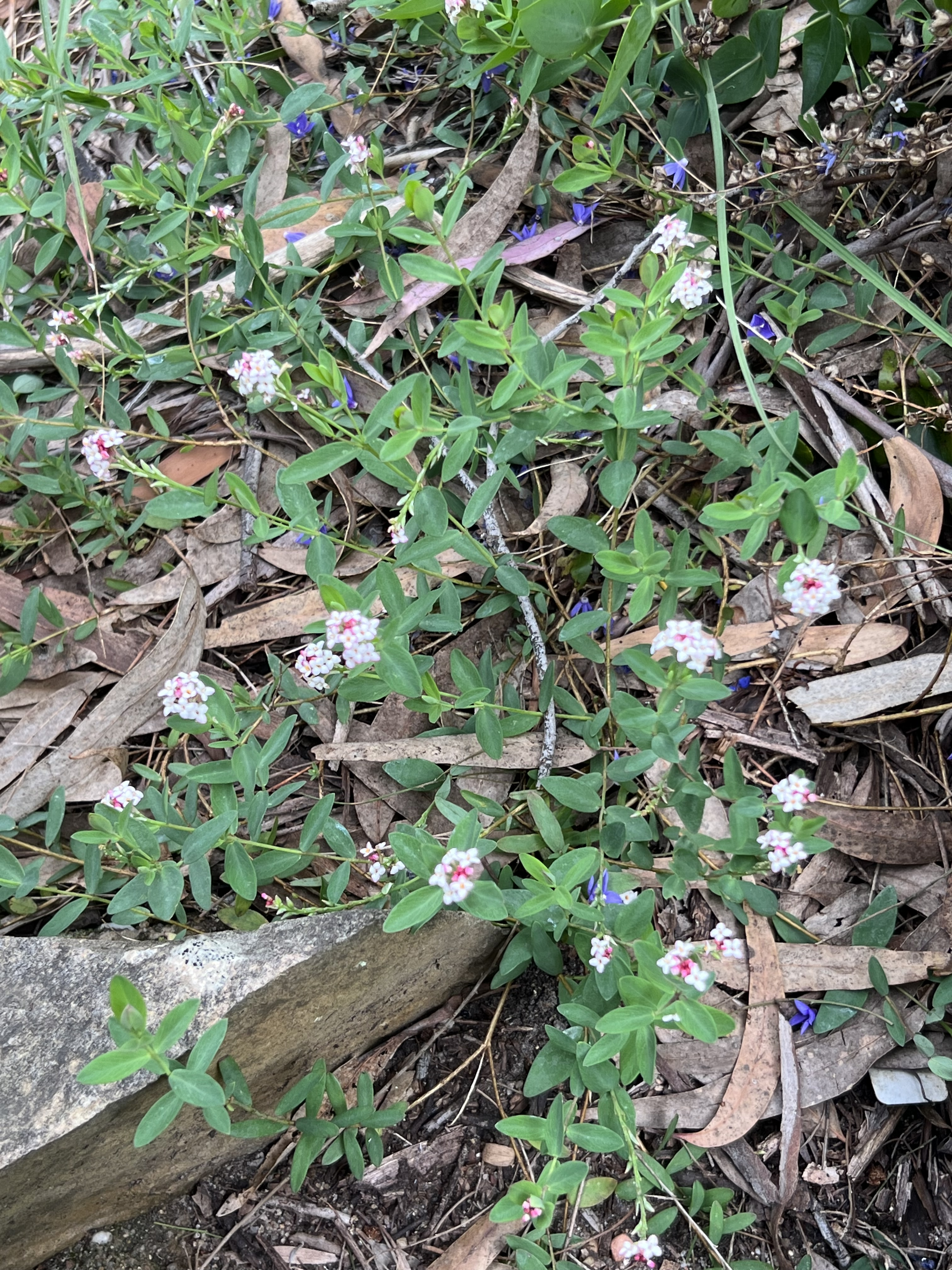
Habit

Pimelea spicata, commonly known as the spiked rice flower, is a flowering plant in the family Thymelaeaceae and is endemic to New South Wales. It is a slender plant with white flowers and elliptic leaves.

== Description ==
Pimelea spicata is a slender upright or decumbent shrub to 50 cm (20 in) high with smooth stems. The leaves elliptic to narrowly elliptic, arranged opposite, 5–20 mm (0.20–0.79 in) long, 2–8 mm (0.079–0.315 in) wide, and pointed to rounded at the apex. The flowers are in terminal spikes up to 14 mm (0.55 in) long, single flowers about 10 mm (0.39 in) long, tubular with four rounded spreading petals, white or sometimes pinkish, borne in racemes, crowded when young, elongated at maturity, on a smooth peduncle 14 mm (0.55 in) long at maturity. Flowering occurs mostly from August to December and the fruit is a small, green, narrowly egg-shaped nut about 2.5 mm (0.098 in) long.

== Taxonomy and naming ==
Pimelea spicata was first formally described in 1810 by Robert Brown and the description was published in Prodromus Florae Novae Hollandiae. The specific epithet (spicata) means "spicate".

== Distribution and habitat ==
This pimelea grows in grassland on shale soils in coastal locations from Landsdowne to Shellharbour and inland to Penrith. Extends along the coast from Lansdowne south to Shellharbour and inland to Penrith, New South Wales.

Invasive weeds which compete with the plant for resources include bridal creeper (Asparagus asparagoides), bitou bush (Chrysanthemoides monilifera), blackberry (Rubus fruticosus agg.), St John's wort (Hypericum perforatum), kikuyu (Pennisetum clandestinum), lantana (Lantana camara), African olive (Olea africana subsp. africana) and privet (Ligustrum lucidum).
