= Long Street Park =

Park in Sydney, Australia

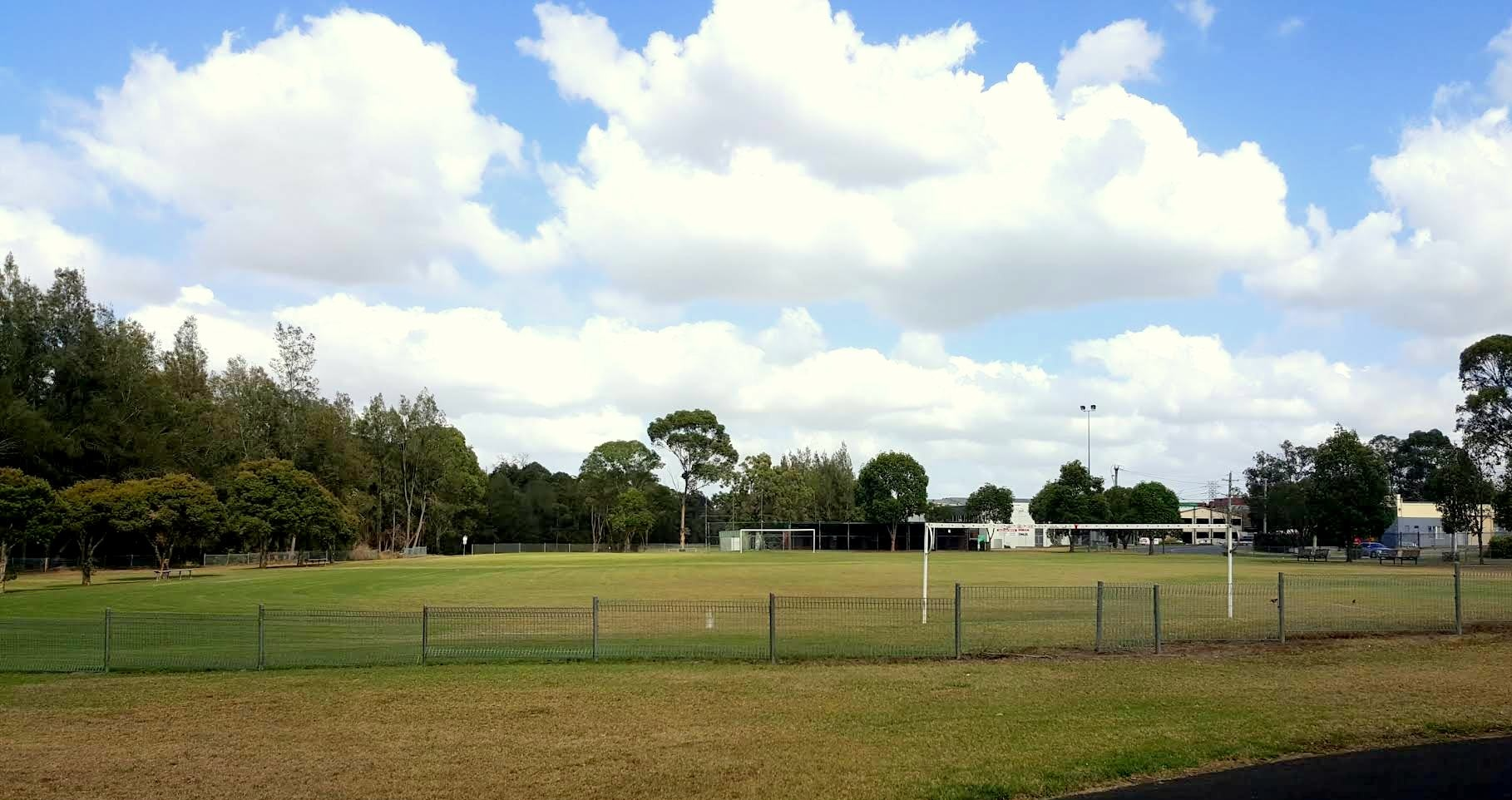
- Interactive map of Long Street Park
- Type: Public park, urban park
- Location: Smithfield, New South Wales, Australia
- Coordinates: 33°50′44″S 150°56′14″E
- Operator: Cumberland City Council
- Status: Open all year
- Facilities: Soccer field, toilets, change rooms, kiosk, spectator seating

Long Street Park is a public park and recreational reserve in Smithfield, in Sydney, New South Wales, Australia. Located at 63 Long Street, the park occupies part of the Prospect Creek corridor within the Cumberland City Council local government area. It adjoins Rosford Park to the west and forms part of a continuous recreational corridor along the creek.

== Geography ==
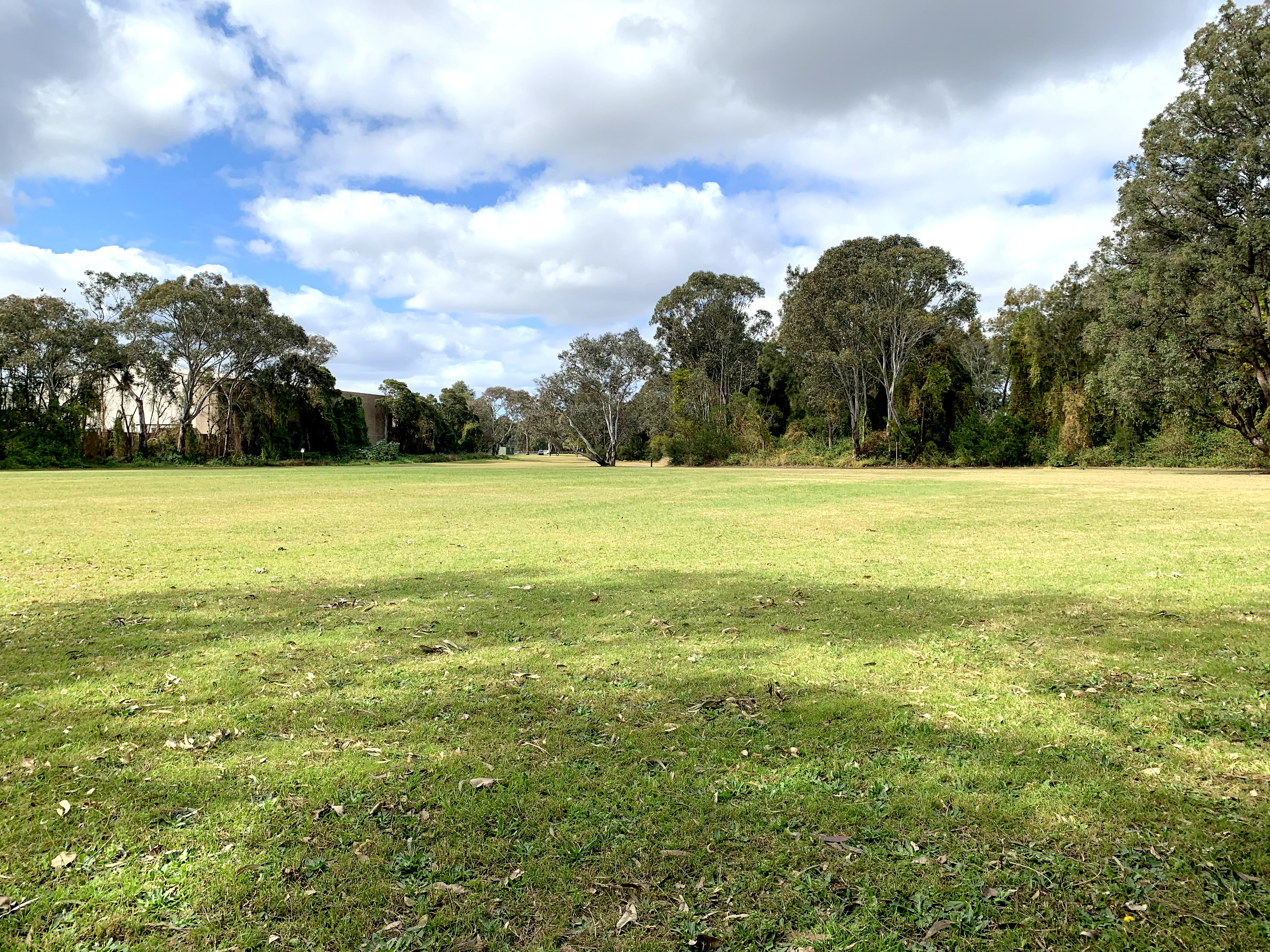
The open grassy area in the park

Long Street Park forms part of the open space and riparian corridor along Prospect Creek. The creek corridor contains areas of native vegetation and provides habitat connectivity through western Sydney. Long Street Park is also connected to the broader Prospect Creek recreational network, which extends through Greystanes, Smithfield, Fairfield and surrounding suburbs.

The park is situated within an industrial area of Smithfield, surrounded on three sides by warehouses, factories and other industrial premises. Environmental restoration has been undertaken in the park and along Prospect Creek. The Friends of Prospect Creek community group organised clean-up activities and tree planting, with more than 17,000 trees and shrubs planted in Long Street Park as part of efforts to improve the creek's ecological condition.

== Recreation ==
Long Street Park is primarily used for organised sport and passive recreation. It contains a soccer field, spectator seating, toilets, change rooms, a kiosk and floodlighting for night training. The park also provides access to the Prospect Creek cycleway, a shared pedestrian and cycling route following the creek corridor.

The park has also been used as the starting and finishing point for the SMC Road Race Series, which holds running events over several distances.

== See also ==
- Prospect Creek
- Prospect Creek cycleway
- Rosford Street Reserve
- Gipps Road and Hyland Road Regional Parklands
