= Prospect Creek cycleway =

Shared use path in Sydney, New South Wales, Australia

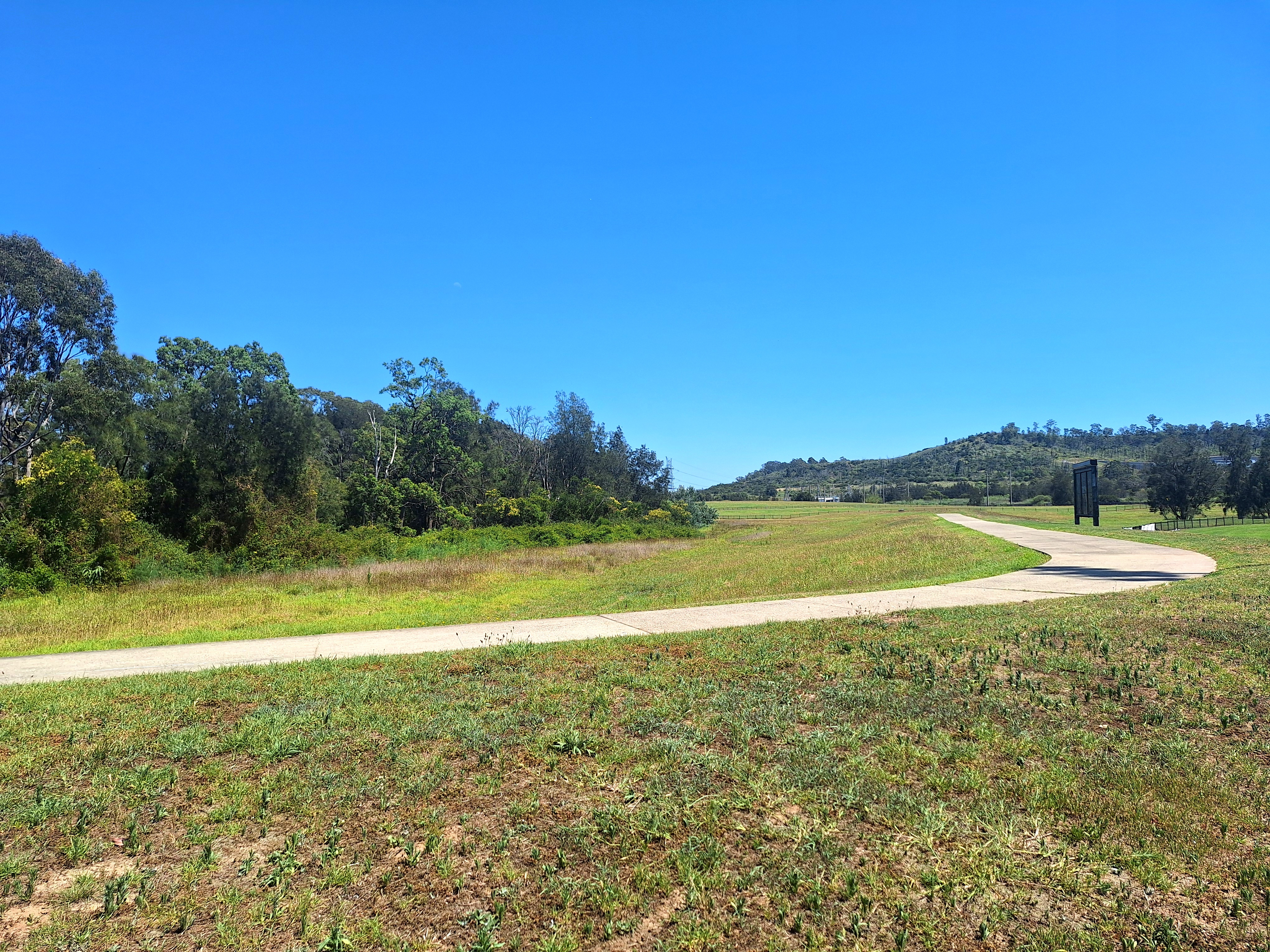
- The shared cycleway as it passes west through Gipps Road Park
- Length: 7.3 kilometres (4.5 mi)
- Location: Western Sydney, New South Wales, Australia
- Established: Late 1980s/early 1990s
- Trailheads: Widemere Road in Wetherill Park (northwest) to Ace Reserve and Fairfield Road in; Fairfield (southeast)
- Use: Cycling; pedestrians
- Elevation change: 23 metres (75 ft)
- Highest point: 35 metres (115 ft) AHD
- Lowest point: 12 metres (39 ft) AHD
- Difficulty: Easy
- Season: All seasons
- Sights: Prospect Creek
- Hazards: Flooding, snakes, falling trees

The Prospect Creek cycleway is a 7.3-kilometre-long (4.5 mi) shared-use path for cyclists and pedestrians in Sydney, New South Wales, Australia that is generally aligned with Prospect Creek and the surrounding swamp oak forest. Also known as Prospect Creek Recreational Shared Cycle Path and Prospect Creek Corridor Cycleway, the cycleway links to the Cumberland City Council network and Fairfield CBD from Fairfield Road in the southeast to the Prospect Nature Reserve in the northwest.

Predominantly off-road and within a riparian zone, its western terminus lies at Widemere Road in Wetherill Park and the eastern terminus is at Ace Avenue in Fairfield. A parallel path begins from Cumberland Highway at Smithfield.

== History ==
The track traversing the northern section of Rosford Street Reserve, between Gipps Road and Long Street Road at Long Street Park, was the first section established in the late 1980s. During the mid-1990s, the cycleway and walkway were extended southeast from Long Street Park to the Cumberland Highway, near Kenyons Bridge in Smithfield. By the early 2000s, the main route and a parallel route south of the creek had been extended to Fairfield Road in Fairfield, with the southern route providing access from residential streets on the northern outskirts of the suburb.

== Route ==
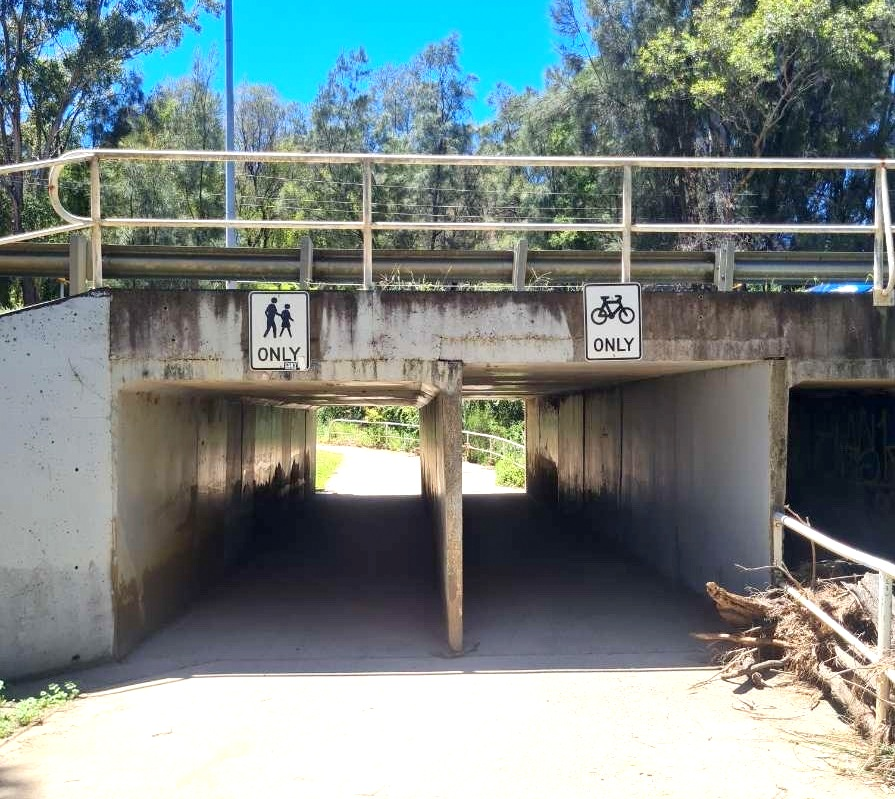
The Gipps Road underpass

Running mostly alongside Prospect Creek, this 6.8-kilometre-long (4.2 mi) cycleway connects Fairfield with Prospect Reservoir, linking with the Parramatta to Liverpool rail trail and the Lower Prospect Canal Reserve cycleway at either end. In the northwest, the cycleway begins at Widemere Road in Wetherill Park, where bollards have been installed at the entrance to prevent vehicle-ramming incidents.

The route subsequently passes predominantly through parkland and riparian bushland along the creek, passing the southeastern edge of Prospect Nature Reserve in Pemulwuy, Gipps Road Park in Greystanes, Rosford Street Reserve and Long Street Park in Smithfield, as well as Beersheba Reserve, Galilee Park, Arbela Park, Bernadette Park, Cawarra Park and Fairfield Road Park. It is almost entirely off-road, apart from a short on-road section along Douglas Street and Ace Avenue. Despite its length, the cycleway crosses only three major roads, Fairfield Road, Cumberland Highway and Gipps Road, with grade-separated underpasses provided at each crossing.

Two parallel paths run along the northern and southern sides of Prospect Creek. The northern route lies within Cumberland City Council and forms the longer continuous section, terminating at Fairfield Road in Yennora. The southern route lies within the City of Fairfield and runs from the Cumberland Highway to Ace Avenue. The southern route provides the most direct connection to the rail trail and Fairfield town centre. Aboriginal interpretive sites established by local councils are located at several points along the route. The Gipps Road underpass in Smithfield West can become inundated during heavy rainfall, although a nearby at-grade crossing provides an alternative route.

== Accessibility ==
The cycleway provides north to south accessibility along Gipps Road and Warren Road, and west to east accessibility alongside Prospect Creek. There is even accessibility to The Horsley Drive. As it heads to Cawarra Park and Crosby Reserve, it will provide numerous connections to the nearby residential roads. Signs will also help cyclists or walkers to traverse towards either Fairfield railway station or Yennora railway station.

Via Hyland Road, the shared-path is linked with the Western Sydney Parklands–Canal Reserve cycleway in the northwest at Greystanes, one the east side of the detention basin, providing accessibility to Prospect Hill and Prospect Nature Reserve in the north. Access to the Canal Reserve cycleway requires passing the Liverpool–Parramatta T-way. The trail is rated "moderate" by AllTrails, describing it as a route that can include gradual climbs or obstacles such as rocks or roots.

== Gallery ==
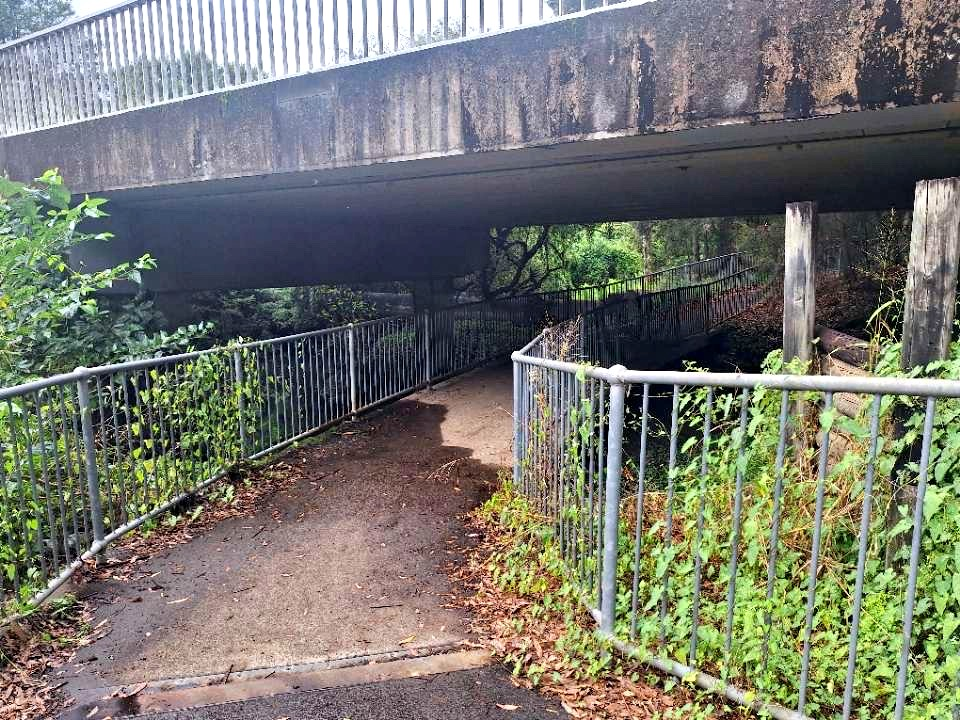
The underpass at Fairfield Road, Fairfield

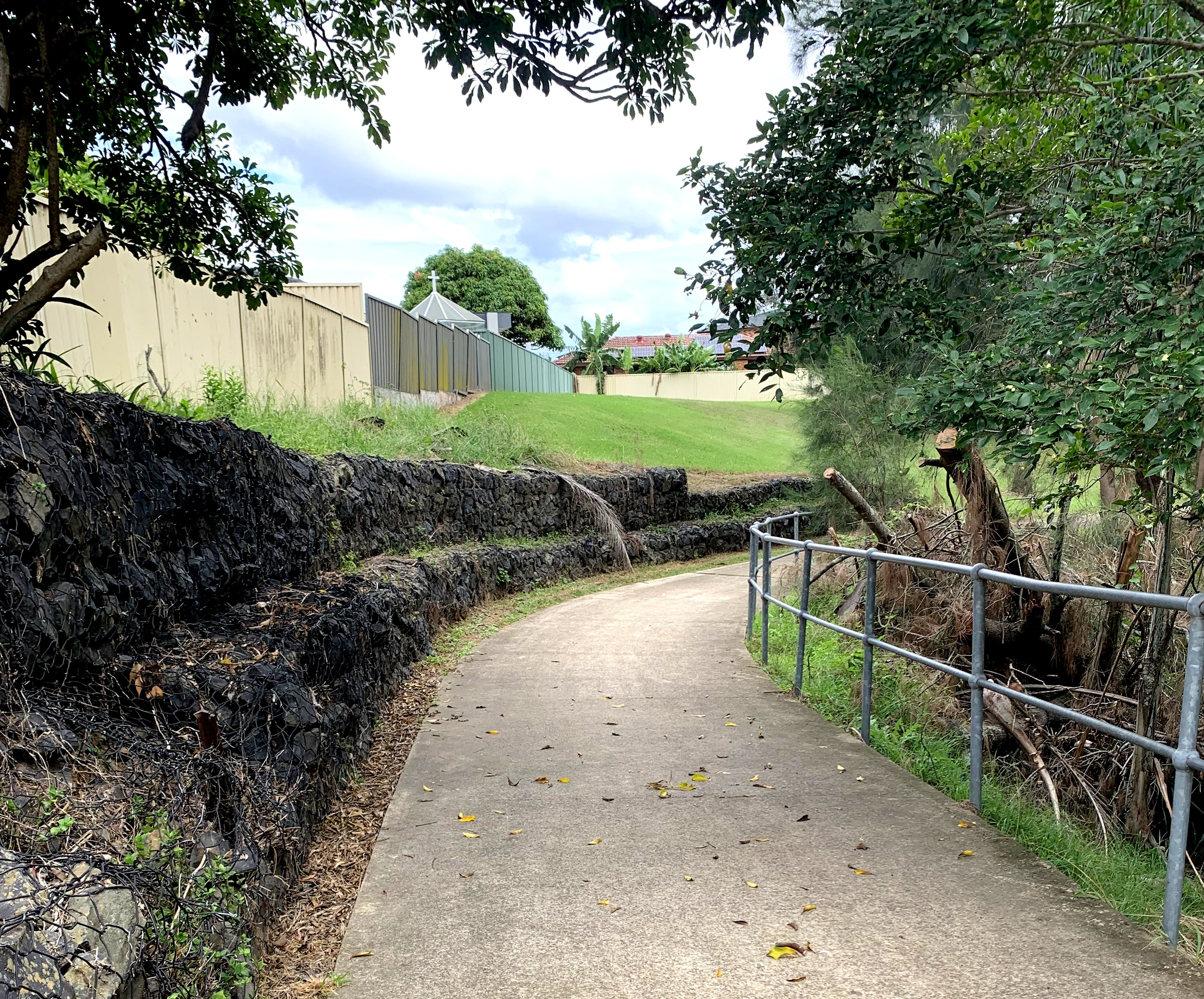
The path at Bernadette Park, Fairfield

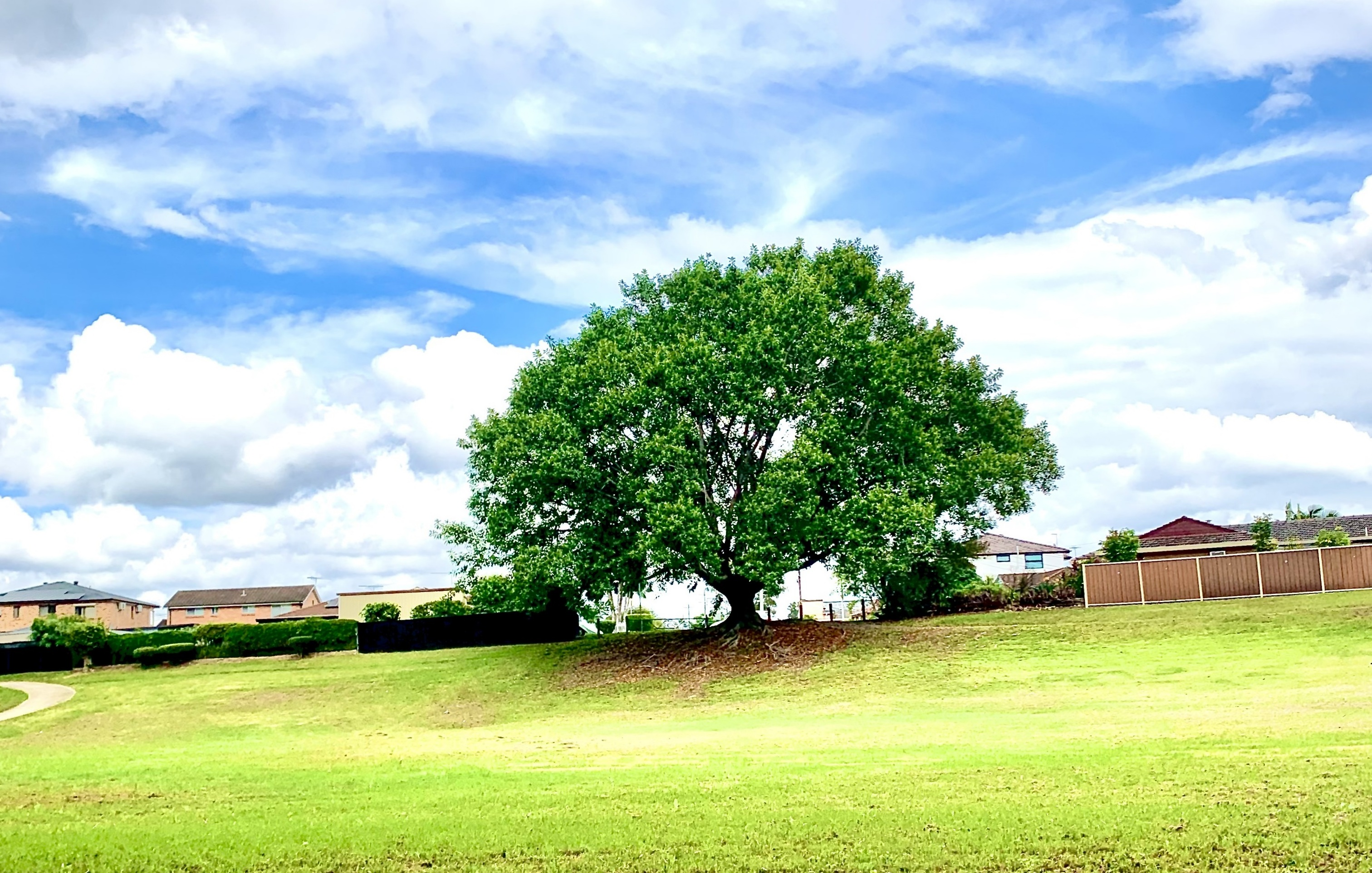
A view of a large rubber fig as the cycleway meanders around Bernadette Park

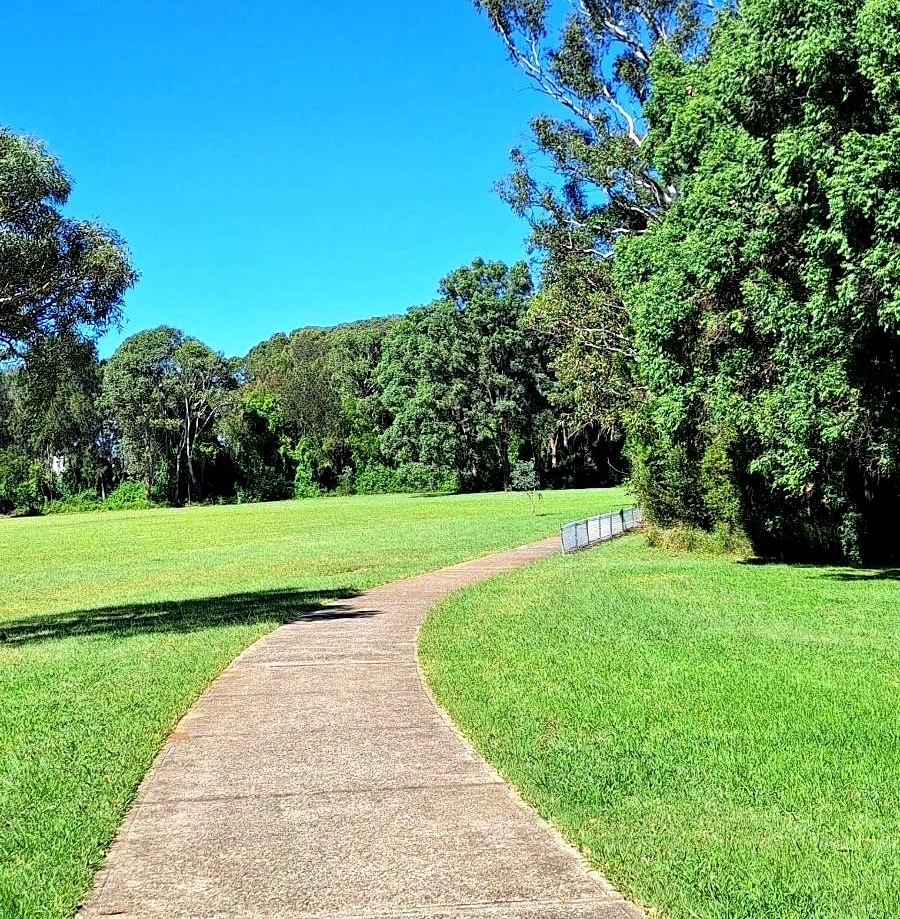
The cycleway at Long Street Park, Smithfield

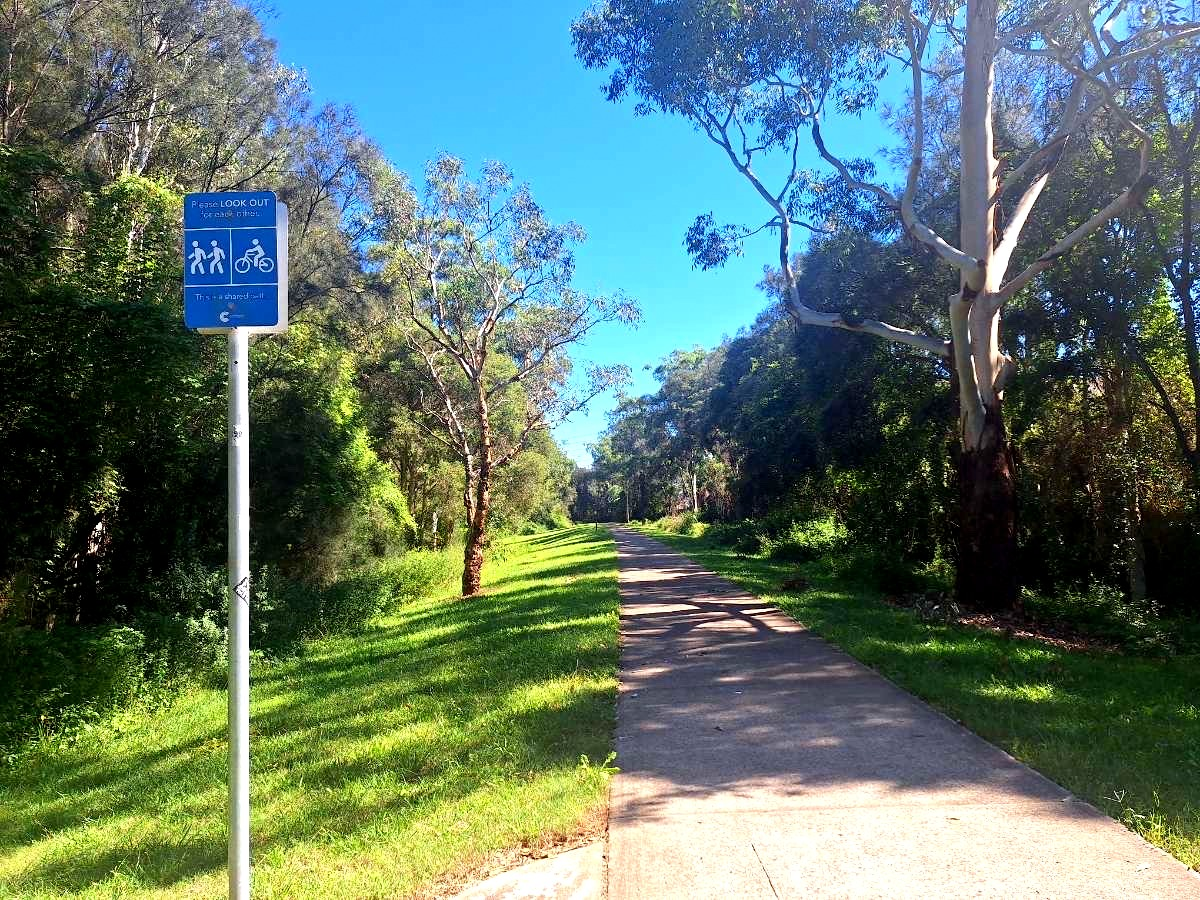
A sign indicating the shared cycleway at Rosford Park, Smithfield

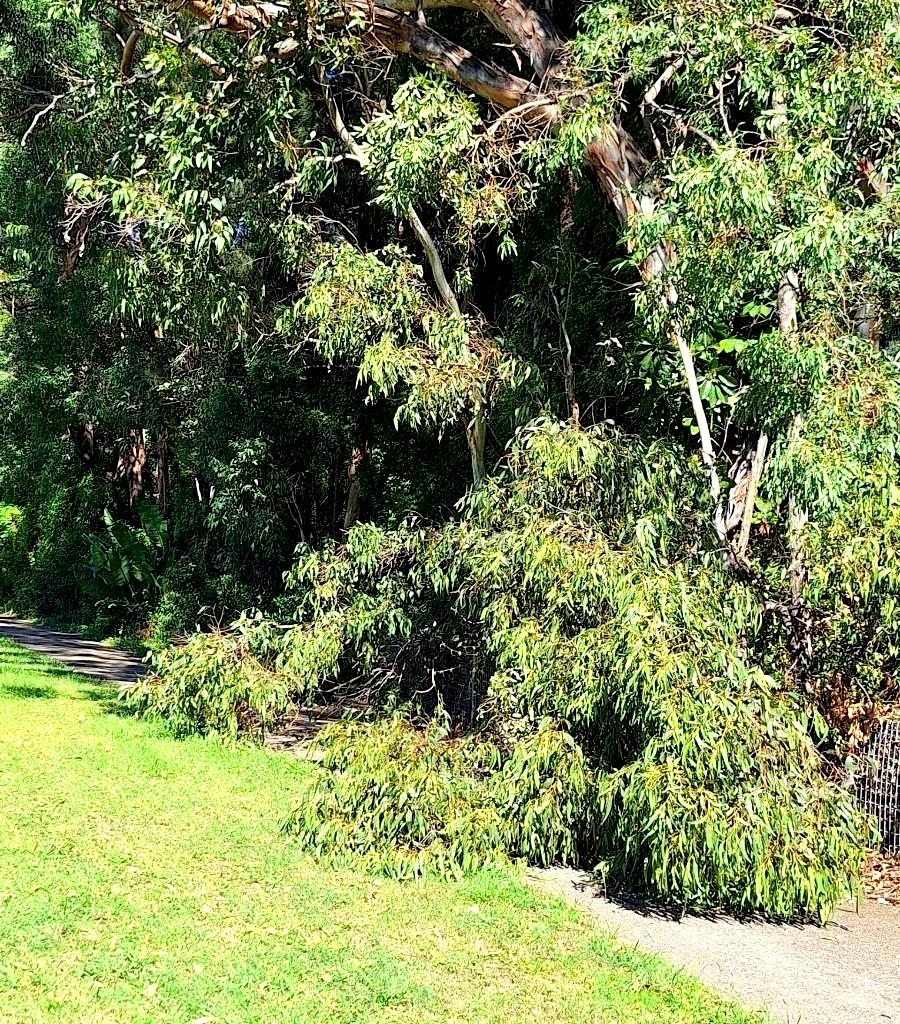
Toppled tree on the cycleway in Smithfield, one of the path's hazards

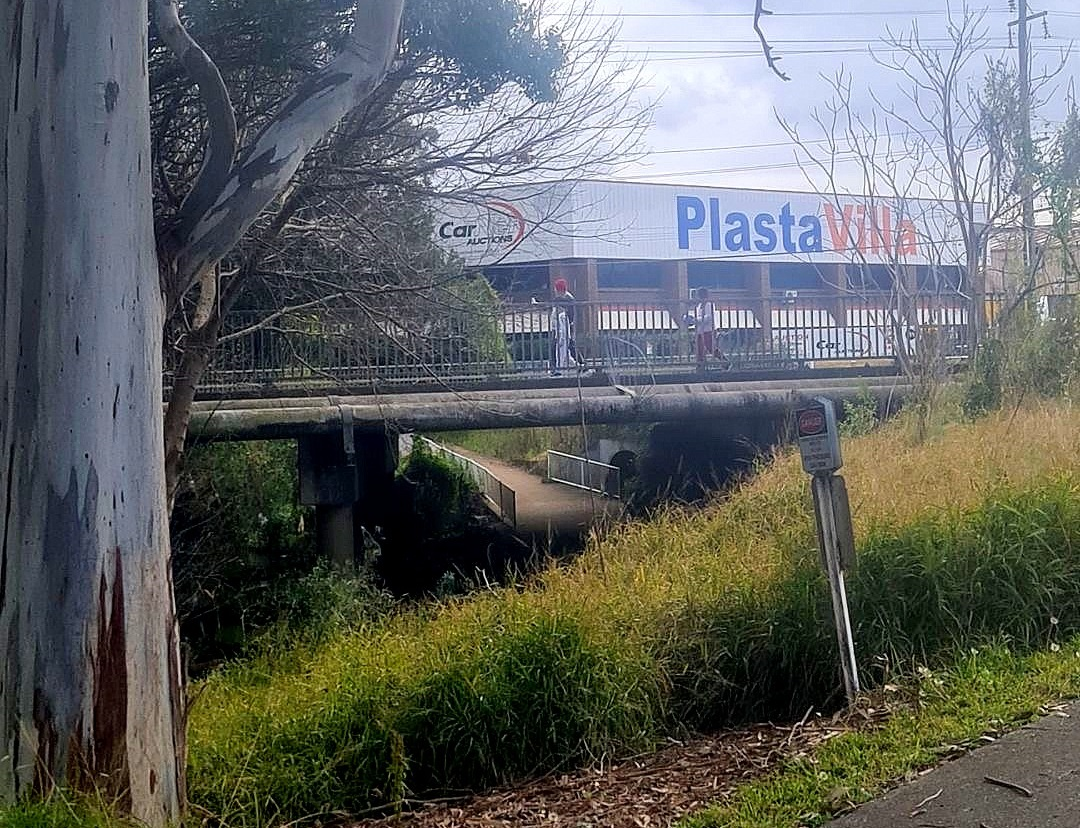
The cycleway heading below Cumberland Highway (Kenyons Bridge) and over Prospect Creek (looking from Kaluna Reserve, Smithfield)

== See also ==
- Bike paths in Sydney
