= Rosford Park =

Urban park in Sydney, Australia

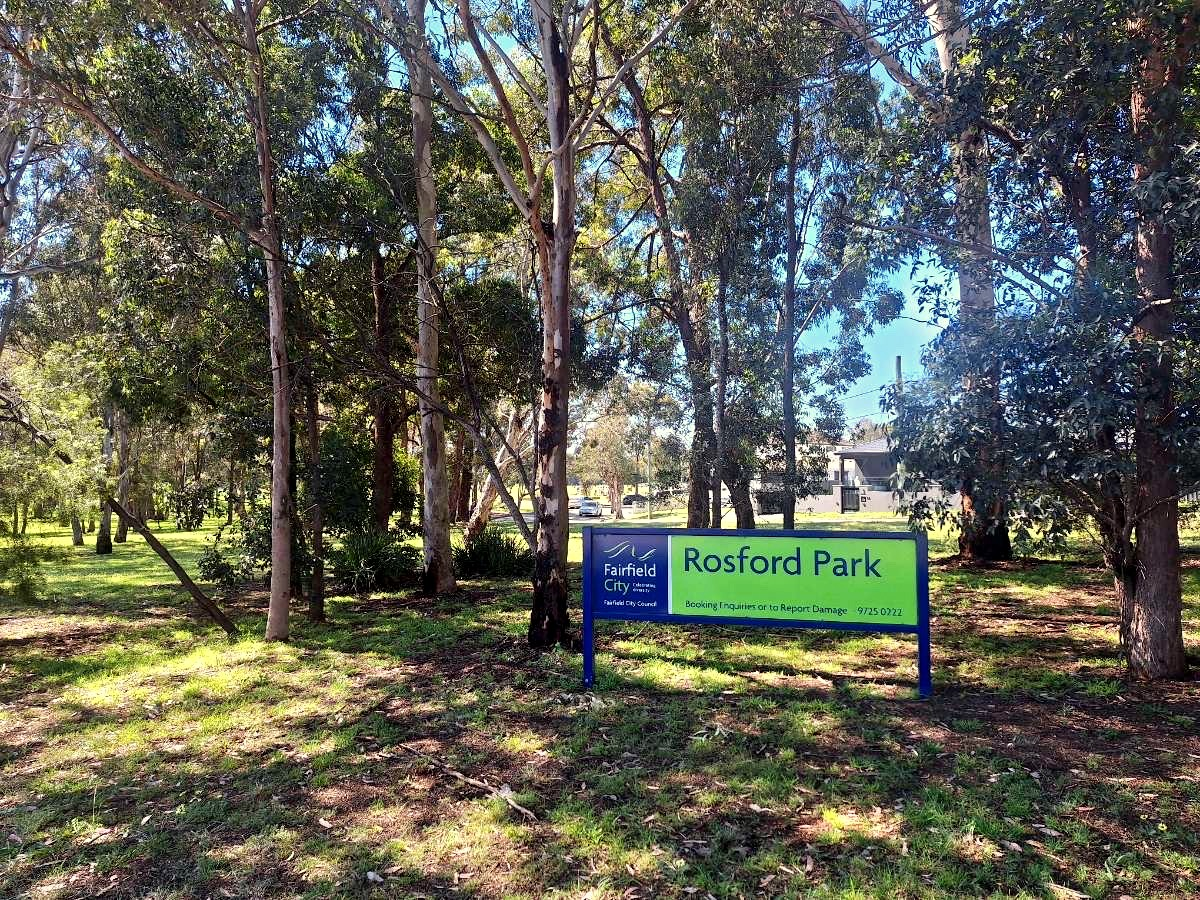
- Entry sign to the park
- Interactive map of Rosford Park
- Type: Urban park, sports ground, nature reserve, urban forest
- Location: Smithfield, Smithfield West
- Coordinates: 33°50′37″S 150°55′43″E
- Area: 20.7 hectares (51.15 acres)
- Opened: 1981
- Operator: Fairfield City Council
- Status: Open all year

Rosford Park, is an urban park and a nature reserve situated in the western suburbs of Sydney, New South Wales, Australia. The parkcontains an open grassland, woodlands and recreational areas surrounded by native plants, such as eucalyptus trees. The parkincorporates Janice Crosio Oval, a fenced sports ground. Sometimes referred to as Rosford Street Reserve, the park is one of the largest non-golf course green spaces in the City of Fairfield area.

== History ==
Prospect Creek, which winds through the park, was an important source of food for the local Aboriginal Australians. The creek contained a number of shell middens, which were also weighty to the natives. After European settlement, in around 1883, the area that was to be parkwas 11 hectares (27.18 acres) and was used to grow vegetables up until 1974. The athletics tracks and grandstand were built in the early 1980s and that area was named Janice Crosio Oval in 1995. The parkwas added through a series of land acquisitions by the Fairfield City Council in 1987.

George Street ran through what is now Rosford Park until the 1950s. John Street was renamed Eyre Street in the 1980s, after the parkhad been established. Dublin Street formerly extended north through the park, where it connected with Gipps Road; today, its northern end is truncated by the park.

== Geography ==
The parkis relatively flat and is located on Rosford Street, its namesake, on the northern periphery of Smithfield and within the locality of Smithfield West. Dublin Street partially bisects the park, while Hassall Street forms its western boundary, Gipps Road lies to the northwest, and Rhondda Street provides access from the southeast. The parkstraddles Prospect Creek, which forms the boundary between the City of Fairfield and Cumberland City Council. Rosford Park consists predominantly of open grassed areas, with a walking track crossing Prospect Creek. The surrounding area is residential to the south and industrial to the north. The parkadjoins Long Street Park to the east, within the Cumberland City Council section of Smithfield, and Gipps Road Sporting Complex to the northwest in Greystanes, with the two connected by an underpass.

== Ecology ==
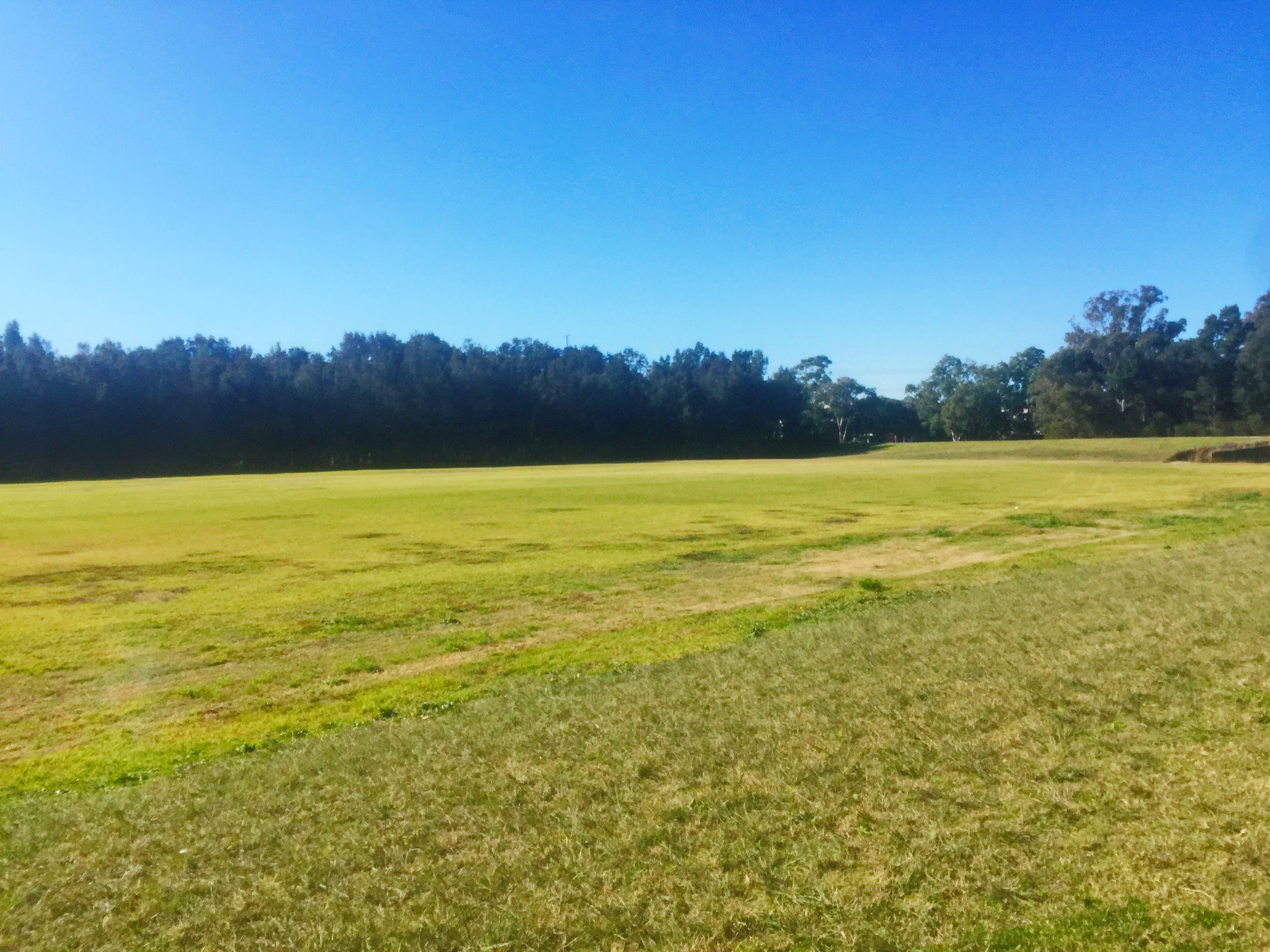
The open field, looking towards the Swamp Oak Forest.

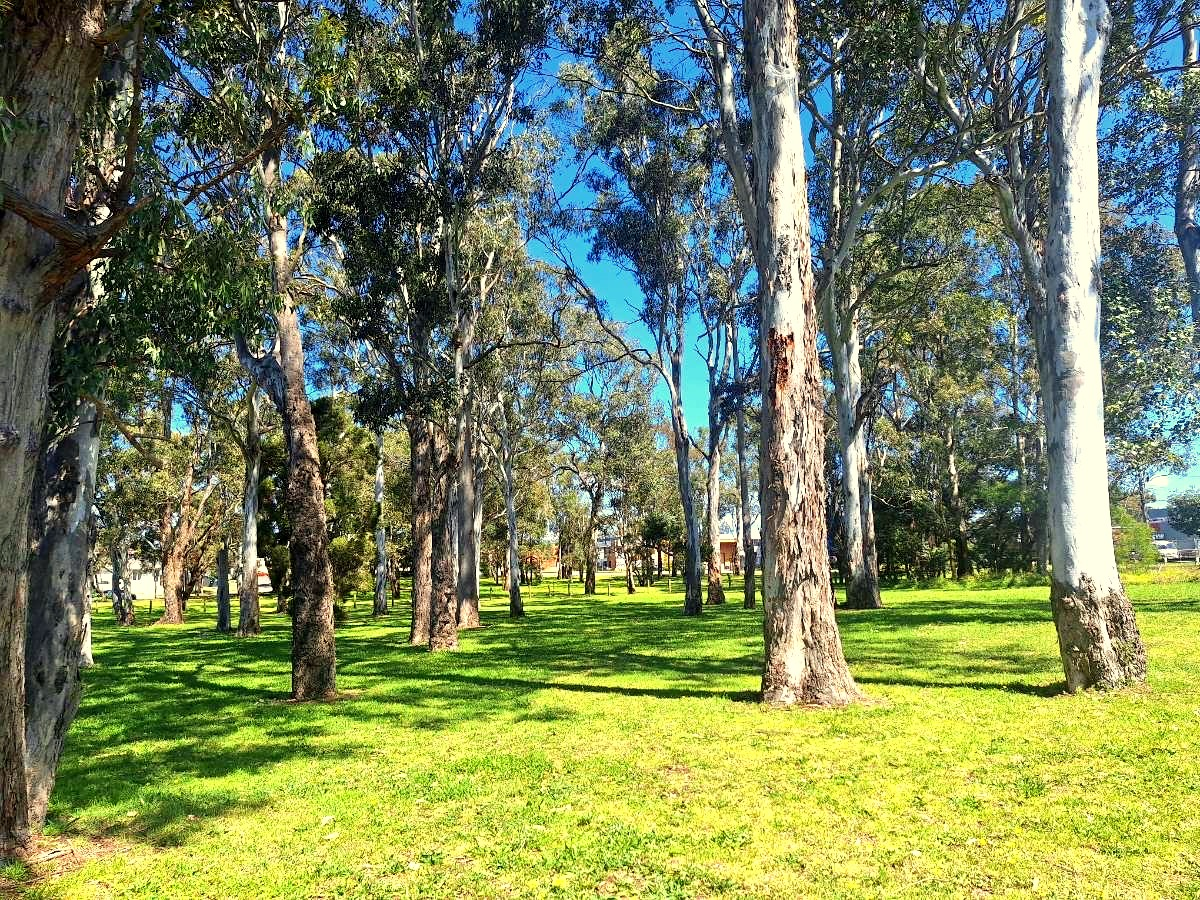
The grove towards Hassall Street

Prior to European settlement, the park featured an open forest, woodland and riparian communities. The park, however, still contains an undisturbed, remnant riparian forest to the north that is part of the endangered Coastal Swamp Oak Forest community, with Prospect Creek winding through it.

The vegetation that surrounds the park'screekline is within the riparian zone and is dominated by Eucalyptus amplifolia, Eucalyptus moluccana, Eucalyptus baueriana, Eucalyptus fibrosa, Eucalyptus teriticornis, angophora floribunda and Casuarina glauca, which grow 10 to 20 meters, with an understorey of Acacia parramattensis, Bursaria spinosa, Daviesia ulicifolia, Exocarpos cupressiformis, Dillwynia, Indigofera australis and over ten native grass species. Introduced species in the riparian woodland include Passiflora suberosa, Solanum mauritianum, Lantana camara, Senna pendula and Cardiospermum halicacabum, among other species.

The fauna includes Australian birds, such as the Australian raven, laughing kookaburra, Australian magpie and the galah. The bell miner is found deep within the wooded areas of the park and seems to be restricted to those regions. Soils in the park include podsols and alluvial soils.

== Features ==
There is a long cycling and walking track through the park, constructed in 2009, which begins at Rhondda Street at the park's southeastern entrance. The track passes through the park's open grassed areas and riparian forest before continuing north to join the Prospect Creek cycleway, providing connections to other parks and open spaces in the region. In late 2021, a second walking trail was constructed along the western side of the park, running parallel to Rosford Street and extending towards Gipps Road. The trail leads to the gallery forest in the park's northwest and connects with the existing track from Rhondda Street.

The park includes a baseball diamond, children's playground and picnic tables. An avenue of trees lines Rosford Street, while rows of logs are incorporated into the landscape. The Janice Crosio Oval is floodlighted and irrigated, and provides facilities for rugby league, soccer, cricket and athletics. A grandstand with spectator seating and an amenities block are also located within the park. A fenced baseball dugout formerly stood on the Rhondda Street side of the park before being removed in 2018.

=== Flood detention basin ===
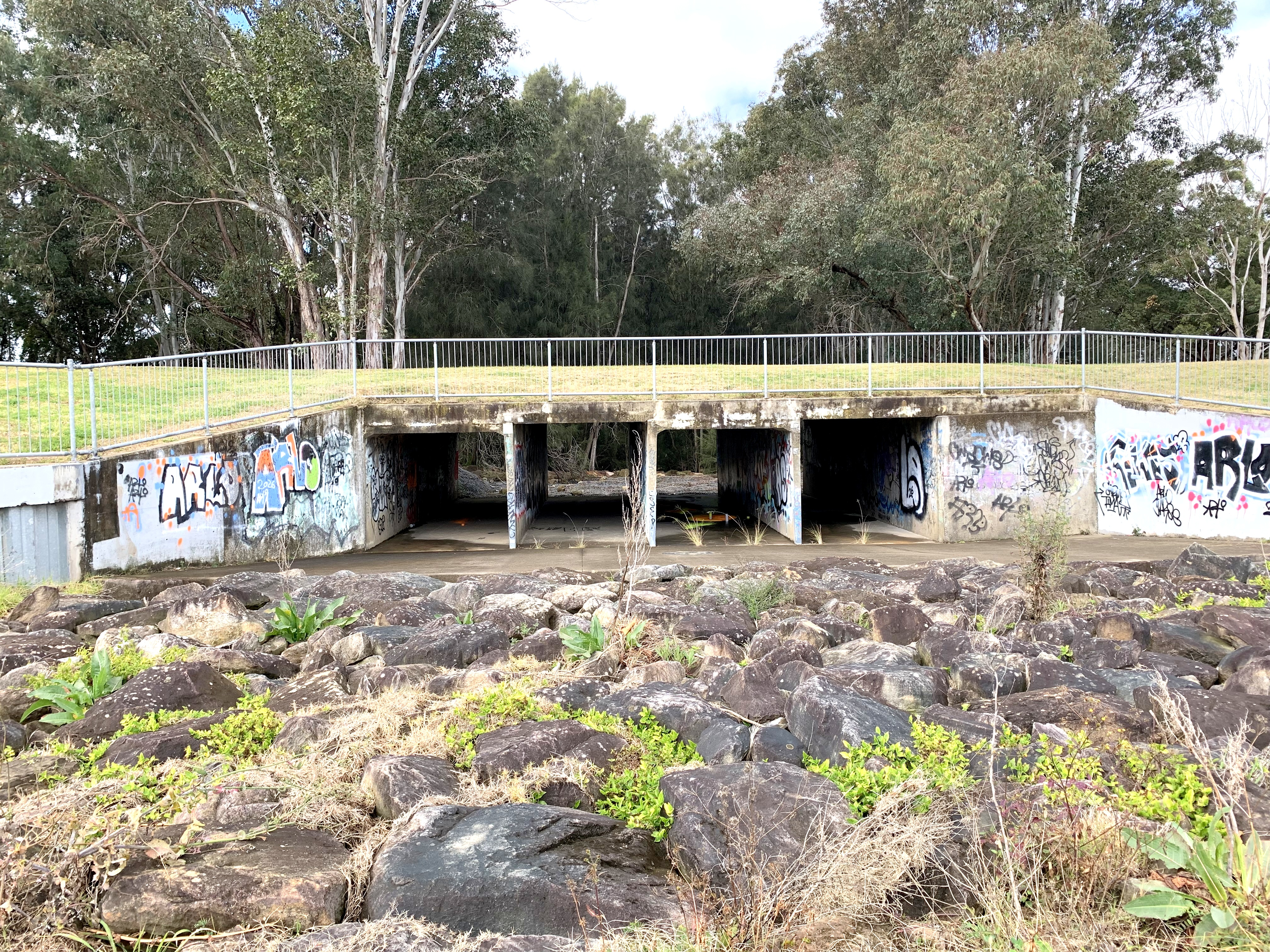
The detention basin's rock-lined drainage channel and multi-cell culvert

The park also functions as a flood detention basin, known as the Rosford Reserve Detention Basin, which is designed to temporarily store stormwater during major rainfall events, thereby reducing the risk of flooding in downstream streets and properties. Completed in the mid-1980s, the park's detention basin is located further downstream along Prospect Creek and has an embankment level of 24.35 m AHD. Its outlet structure originally consisted of a five-cell box culvert, although improvement works in the mid-1990s closed one of the cells. The four remaining open cells range from 2.40 to 2.44 m (7.87 to 8.01 ft) in width and 2.08 to 2.24 m (6.82 to 7.35 ft) in height. A steady nominal outflow from Prospect Reservoir was presumed as the upstream boundary condition for Prospect Creek, while a stage–discharge relationship was applied as the downstream boundary condition at a location approximately 70 m downstream of the Rosford Street detention basin outlet.

The park's basin is designed to accommodate approximately a 1-in-100-year flood event, with stored water draining eastward through the drainage system towards Prospect Creek. Drainage infrastructure within the park, including reinforced rock-lined sections and concrete structures, assists in managing stormwater flows and protecting the drainage outlet from erosion. In 2015, inspections identified significant scour at the outlet structure of the detention basin, with erosion affecting the park's playing field, the area around the culvert headwall on the basin embankment, and the inlet energy dissipater. A geotechnical investigation was subsequently required to assess the structural integrity of the basin wall and determine appropriate remediation measures. Modelling of the 1% annual exceedance probability (AEP) flood indicates that a storm duration of approximately two hours produces the highest flood levels along the major overland flow path affecting the park. The detention basin can therefore become inundated during significant rainfall events, temporarily storing stormwater before it is released through its controlled outlet.

== Sport ==
Rosford Park is an important sporting venue for the area and is home to several community sporting clubs. Smithfield Athletics operates Little Athletics competitions at Janice Crosio Oval, offering track and field events for children and teenagers. The club was established in 1981 as Smithfield Hotspurs Little Athletics, with Fairfield City Council allocating the newly constructed athletic oval as its home ground; more than 300 children registered during its inaugural season. The park also has a longstanding rugby connection. The Smithfield Warthogs Rugby Club moved to a permanent home ground at Rosford Park in 1982, while the CH Dragons RLFC currently use the park as a home ground. The park is also used by local schools for athletics carnivals and school sporting excursions.

== See also ==
- Fairfield Park Precinct
- Wetherill Park Nature Reserve
- Western Sydney Regional Park
- Brenan Park
- Prospect Nature Reserve
