= AllTrails =

Outdoor fitness and travel mobile app

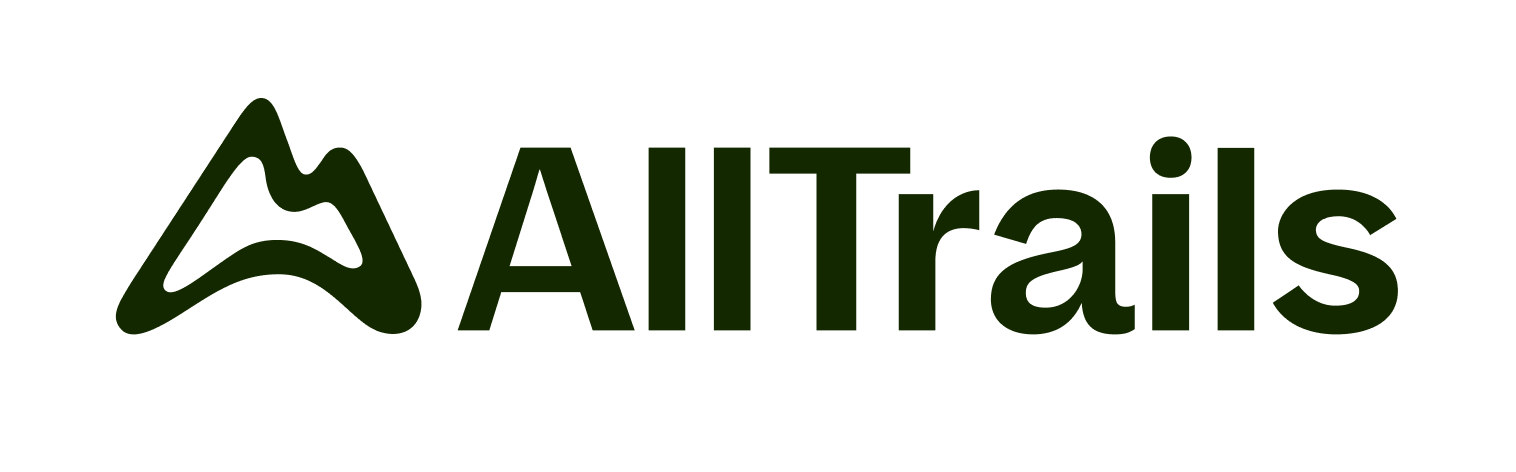

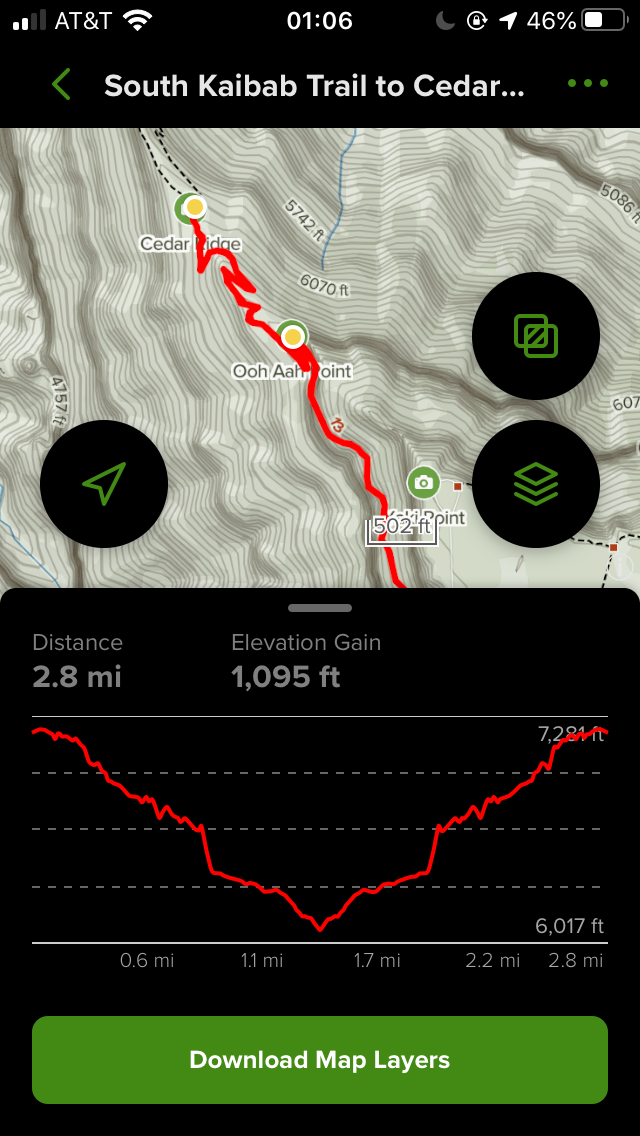
- Screenshot iPhone example of in-app experience
- Company type: Privately held
- Available in: English, Danish, Dutch, French, German, Italian, Norwegian Bokmål, Polish, Portuguese, Spanish, Swedish
- Founded: December 17, 2010; 15 years ago
- Headquarters: San Francisco, California, U.S.
- Founder: Russell Cook
- CEO: Liz Hamren (from Dec 2025)
- Industry: Health & fitness and travel
- Products: Android, iOS, Web browser, WatchOS, Wear OS
- Parent: AllTrails, LLC
- Subsidiaries: GPSies, Trails.com, iFootpath, EveryTrail
- Website: www.alltrails.com
- Commercial: Freemium

AllTrails is a fitness and travel mobile app used in various outdoor recreational activities, such as hiking and mountain biking. The service allows users to access a database of trail maps, which includes crowdsourced reviews and images. Depending on a user's subscription status, these resources can be used online and offline.

== Overview ==
AllTrails operates on a freemium business model. It is accessible through a mobile app or a web browser for computers. Users can access the app's advanced features via a subscription service called AllTrails+.

Registration is required on AllTrails. Users can register via Apple, Facebook, or Google or by manually entering their name, email and password.

Once a user has registered, they will be able to search and explore trails, as well as read reviews for those trails left by other users. Upon arriving at a trail, a user will be able to see information about the trail, track their activity, or even add new trails to the service. Additional features are available but require users to purchase a subscription in order to access them.

== History ==
AllTrails was founded in 2010 by Russell Cook. It was accepted into AngelPad's inaugural class. This incubation period preceded its official launch in December 2010. In 2011, AllTrails gained $400k in seed funding from 500 Global (previously 500 Startups) and 2020 Ventures. As of January 2012, AllTrails had reached 200,000 users.

A major partnership between National Geographic and AllTrails was announced in early 2012. The partnership contributed to an increase in the app's user base and enhanced its mapping data. This partnership also resulted in National Geographic's Topo.com being merged and redirected to AllTrails. By Q4 2012, 1 million users had installed AllTrails. In August 2016, AllTrails announced that it had acquired EveryTrail from TripAdvisor, who had formerly acquired the company in 2011. AllTrails was listed in the 100 Best Android Apps of 2017 by PhanDroid.

In 2018, Spectrum Equity provided $75 million in funding to AllTrails in exchange for a majority position in the company. Ben Spero and Matt Neidlinger of Spectrum Equity joined AllTrails' board of directors. In 2018, though the company was said to be cash flow positive, it announced a new round of funding which ultimately resulted in its acquisition. In April 2019, AllTrails announced the acquisition of iFootpath. In May, AllTrails announced that the app was available in French, German and Spanish. Formerly, the app had only been available in English. In July, AllTrails announced its acquisition of GPSies and Trails.com. In December, AllTrails entered into a partnership with Rolling Strong to provide truck drivers with tools and resources aimed at promoting fitness and overall health while on the road.

In 2020, Apple partnered with AllTrails to add hiking information to Apple Maps. This was largely in response to the growing popularity of outdoor activities during the global COVID-19 pandemic. These trends in behavior contributed to "8.7 million users" installing the application in 2020, which represented an "89%" increase from the previous year.
