= Gipps Road and Hyland Road Regional Parklands =

Urban park system in Sydney, Australia

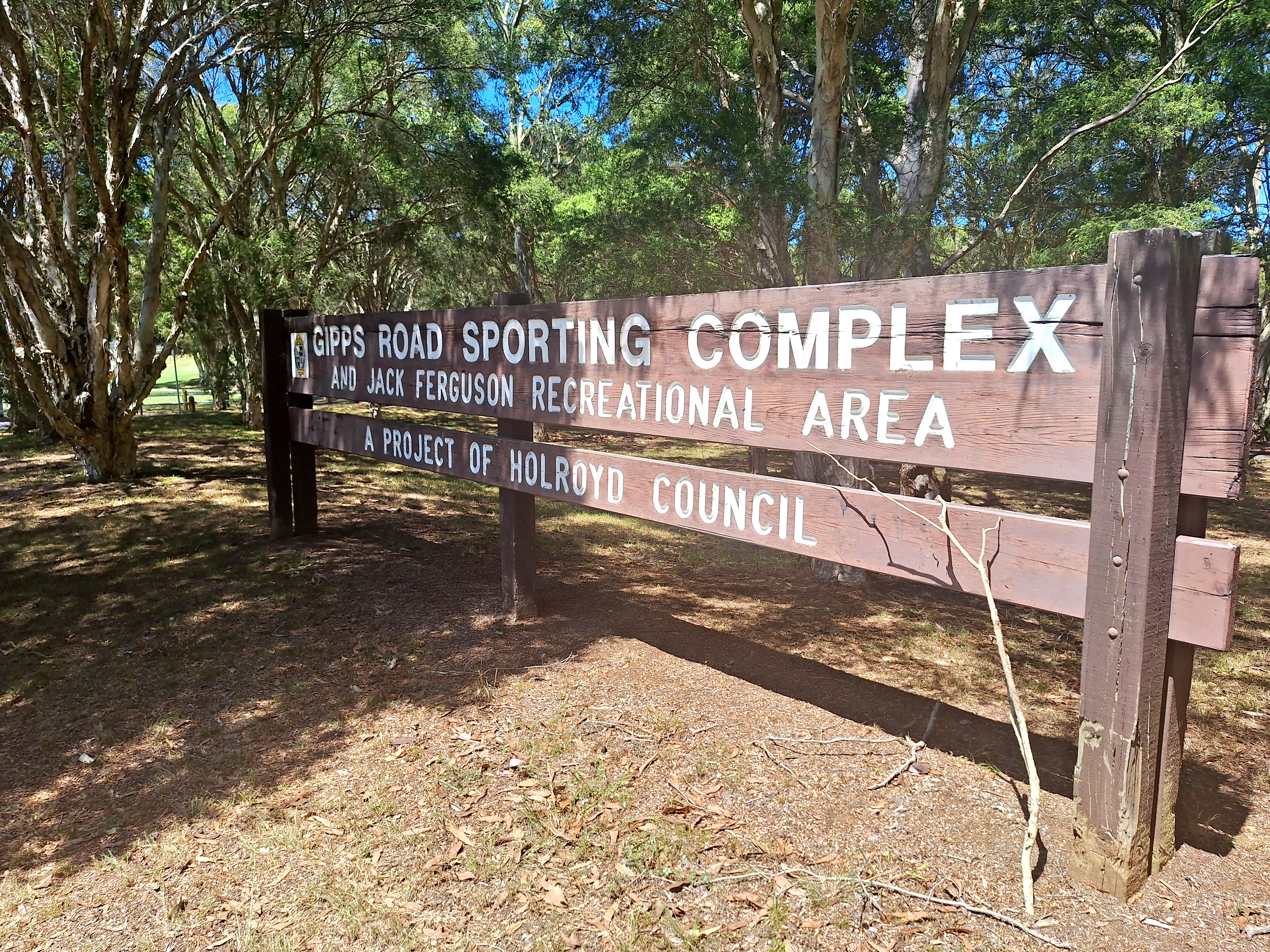
- Entrance sign to the Sporting Complex urban park
- Interactive map of Gipps Road and Hyland Road Regional Parklands
- Type: Urban park, sports ground, nature reserve
- Location: Greystanes
- Coordinates: 33°50′17″S 150°55′24″E
- Area: 63 hectares (155.68 acres)
- Opened: 1985
- Operator: Cumberland City Council
- Status: Open all year

Gipps Road and Hyland Road Regional Parklands is an urban park system and nature reserve situated in the western suburbs of Sydney, New South Wales, Australia, which incorporates Gipps Road Sporting Complex (Gipps Road Park), Hyland Road Park and Hyland Road Reserve. Situated in Greystanes, the parklands are bisected by the Liverpool–Parramatta T-way in the centre, and are bordered by both residential and industrial zones.

Located in the south of the precinct, the Sporting Complex is the most popular urban park in the system, which contains sportsgrounds and a picnic zone (within the Jack Ferguson Recreational Area). Lying on a large, flat landscape along Prospect Creek, the Sporting Complex is used for AFL, baseball and athletics. Situated in the north and middle, respectively, Hyland Road Reserve and Hyland Road Park are mostly remnant bushland with very few recreational facilities.

== History ==
The area was first settled in the 1790s when land grants were given to emancipated convicts for agricultural activities. Ownership of the lands constantly changed when, in the early 1800s, Irish convict Matthew Hyland coalesced the abutting lands, where he constructed a large homestead. Due to its agricultural inheritance, the parklands remained grazing lands further into the 20th century when a water pipeline between Prospect Reservoir and a pipehead was constructed in 1934. The land was purchased by Holroyd Municipal Council in 1939. Holroyd Council began to modify the Hyland Road Park field into a landfill that ran until 1985 when it became a landfill for clean fill. Jack Ferguson Recreational Area was opened in 1986.

== Geography ==
=== Gipps Road Sporting Complex ===
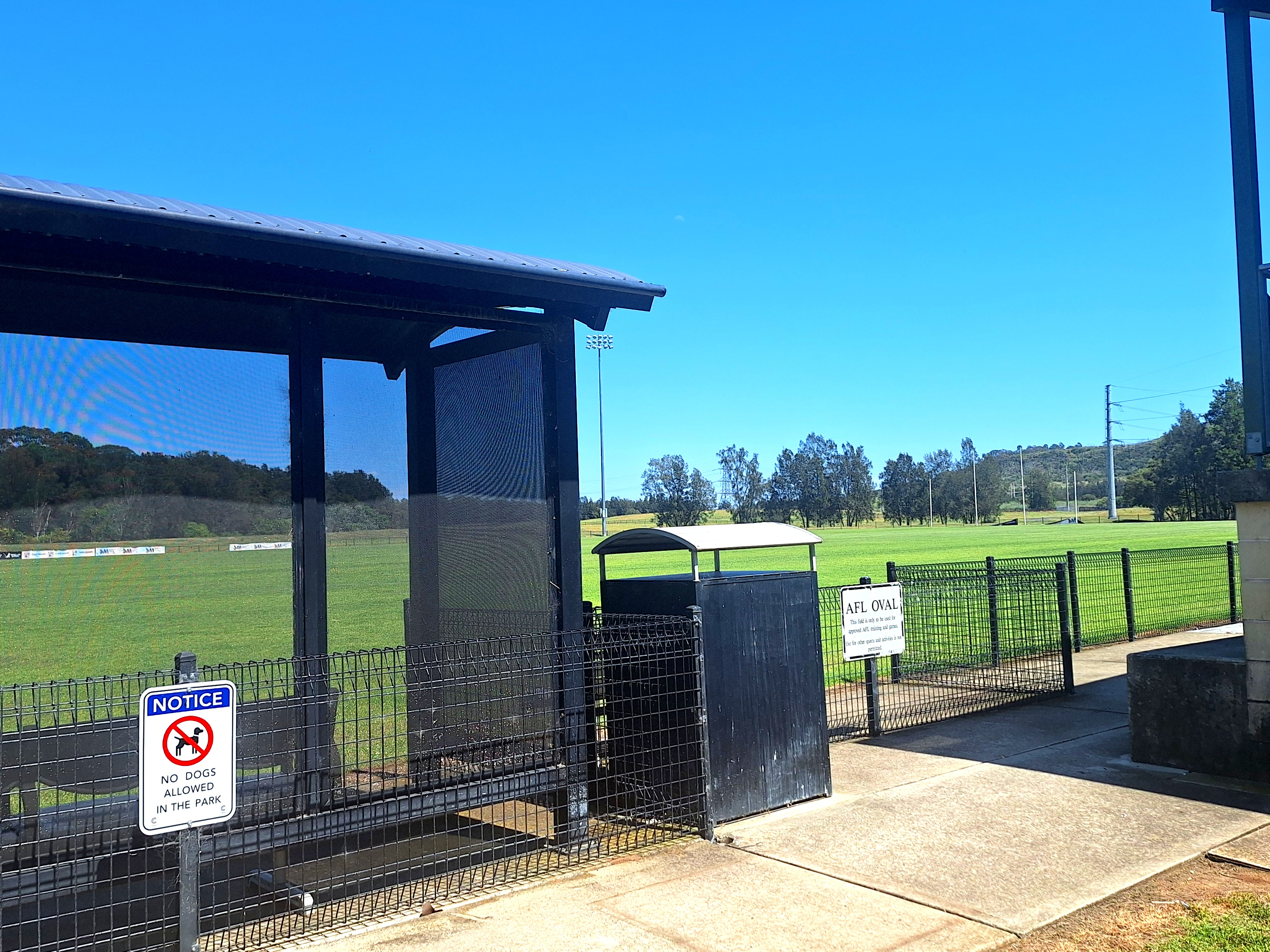
AFL oval

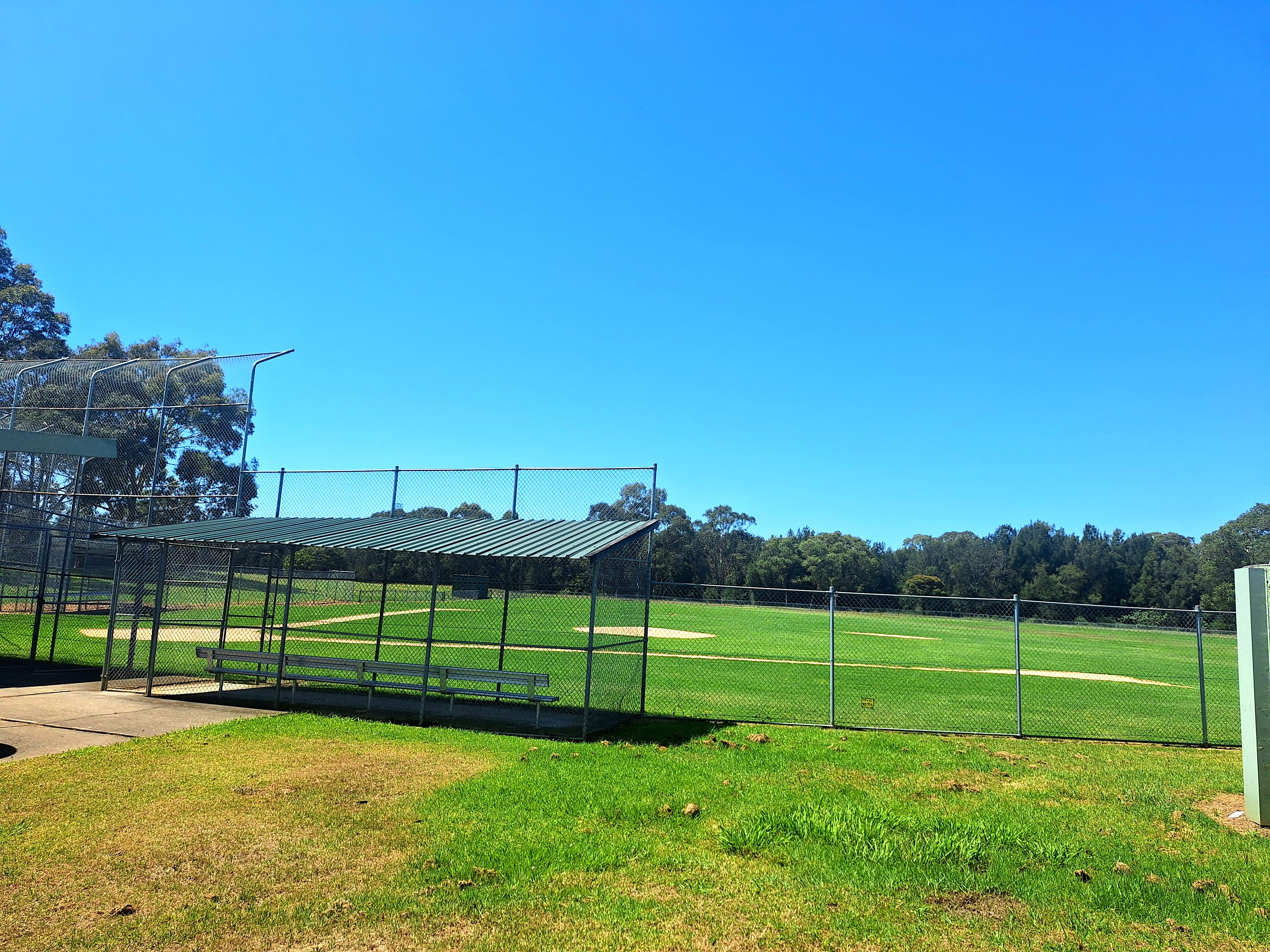
Baseball field

In Gipps Road, to the south, is Gipps Road Sporting Complex (Gipps Road Park) which, on its western side, chiefly consists of grassland and undulating scenery that includes hills, depressions, and walking tracks, providing elevated vistas in all directions, particularly of Prospect Hill to the north. The eastern portion is primarily flat, so it can conform to the sport fields and parking zone, in addition to having good levels of natural surveillance with visual modality from Gipps Road and the adjacent carpark.

Historically, Gipps Road Park was cleared for vegetation since the 1800s as it was used for agricultural purposes. Today, the park consists of turf with sporadic clusters of trees, and it still features native woodland such as Coastal Swamp Oak Forest on the banks of Prospect Creek, though a flood control construction has affected a portion of the creek near the baseball field. Two zones of remnant bushland still exist in the northwestern corner that connects to Hyland Road Park to the north and the riparian zone on both sides of Prospect Creek on the southern bounds. Moreover, the Sporting Complex is contiguous with Rosford Street Reserve to the south, in Smithfield, via an underpass beneath Gipps Road.

The Jack Ferguson Reserve, situated at the corner of Gipps Road and the Liverpool–Parramatta T-way, features a picnic zone and children's playground, in addition to a retention basin which is filled up by runoff from Hyland Road Park and Gipps Road Sporting Complex. The overflow of the pond is transported by pipe and grass swale to Prospect Creek.

=== Hyland Road Park ===
Hyland Road Park, which is just north of Gipps Road Park (above) and south of Hyland Road, lies in the centre of the parklands. It is a former landfill planned for development as a sportsground that features an elevated point in the northwest corner. Since 2013 it has mainly been an undeveloped landfill site, with the exception of its boundary where a large part of the Cumberland Plain Woodland encircles the stream that meanders along Gipps Road, extending from the northern boundary of the Parklands to a pond in the northwestern nook of the Sporting Complex.

The park has a natural drainage line on its eastern end that empties in the retention basin at the Jack Ferguson Reserve to the south. Several modifications have caused the establishment of an sporadic overflowing wetland area that covers the central component of the bushland area. The zone between Gipps Road and the drainage line still maintains a species constitution which is typical of the natural vegetation that was present in the Sydney area prior to European settlement. Although the vegetation has been disturbed, there is ongoing robust regeneration in the area. Although fencing aids conservation of the species, the nearby traffic from Gipps Road and the waterway have become a source of weed invasion.

=== Hyland Road Reserve ===
In the north, Hyland Road Reserve sits on the sloped base of Prospect Hill just north of Hyland Road, where it spans from the defunct water supply canal in the west to the reconstructed waterway in the east. Located in the western end of the bushy corridor that is known as the Lower Prospect Canal Reserve, it features remnants of the vegetation of the Cumberland Plain, blended with open grasslands and a periodically filled wetland area. The Reserve is broadly cleared with some zones of regenerated planted vegetation. Though the most thick-forested areas are found near the waterway on the Reserve's eastern hem, which connect to the waterway in Hyland Road Park in the south.

== Ecology ==
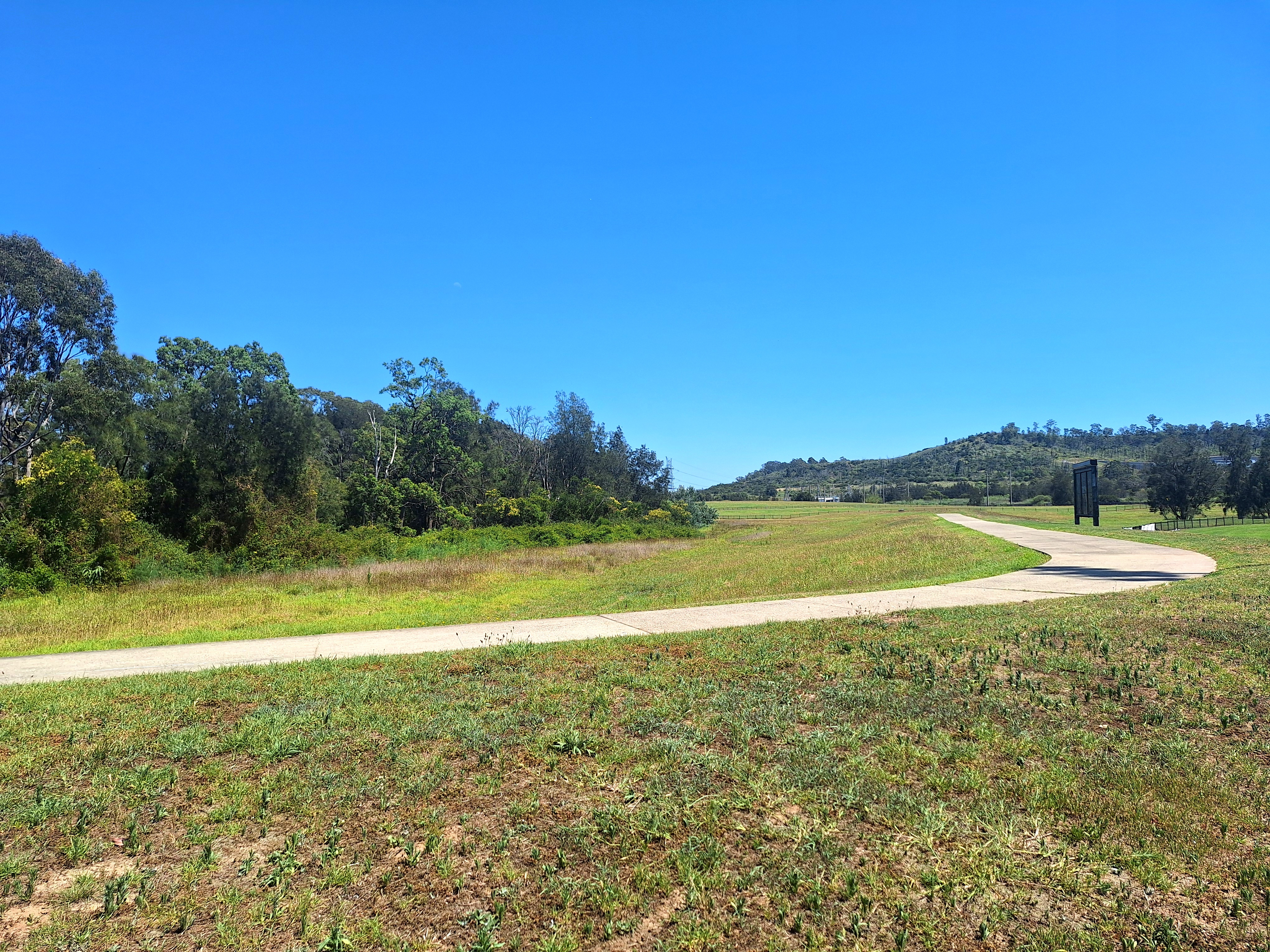
The shared walking/cycling path (Prospect Creek cycleway) near the bushy creek

Vegetation near the Sporting Complex primarily consist of Casuarina glauca, with sporadic areas that feature trees such as Angophora floribunda (rough-barked apple) and Eucalyptus tereticornis. Other trees include, Melaleuca styphelioides (prickly leaved paperbark), Acacia parramattensis (green Wattle), Pittosporum undulatum and Eucalyptus amplifolia (cabbage gum), which is found near the creek, in addition to Eucalyptus fibrosa (narrow-leaved ironbark) and Bursaria spinosa (blackthorn), which are the most widespread in Hyland Road Park.

Shrubs include, Indigofera australis (native indigo), Pultenaea sp. and Acacia falcata. Ground layer features dense growth of Pennisetum clandestinum, Typha orientalis, Hardenbergia violacea, Phragmites australis and Tradescantia albiflora, which are found in the wetter parts of Hyland Road Park.

Introduced species include Lantana camara, Ligustrum sinense (small leaved privet) and Ligustrum lucidum (large-leaved privet). The creek and pond features several weed species, such as, Myriophyllum brasilence and Isolepis prolifera, with native aquatic plants that include Persicaria decipiens and Schoenoplectus validus. In addition to a small community of reptiles and amphibians, around 130 species of bird have been observed in the area.

The vegetation near Prospect Creek vegetation has been affected by major degradation, mainly due to direct disturbance of the soil from neighboring land uses which resulted in high amounts of nutrients from the Creek and discharges from urban modification upstream of the park. Despite the disturbance, the residual vegetation still has enough native species and vegetation pattern for it to be considered as a genuine bushland remnant. Furthermore, the large grass area requires frequent maintenance and the trees there are arduous to maintain.

== Features and facilities ==
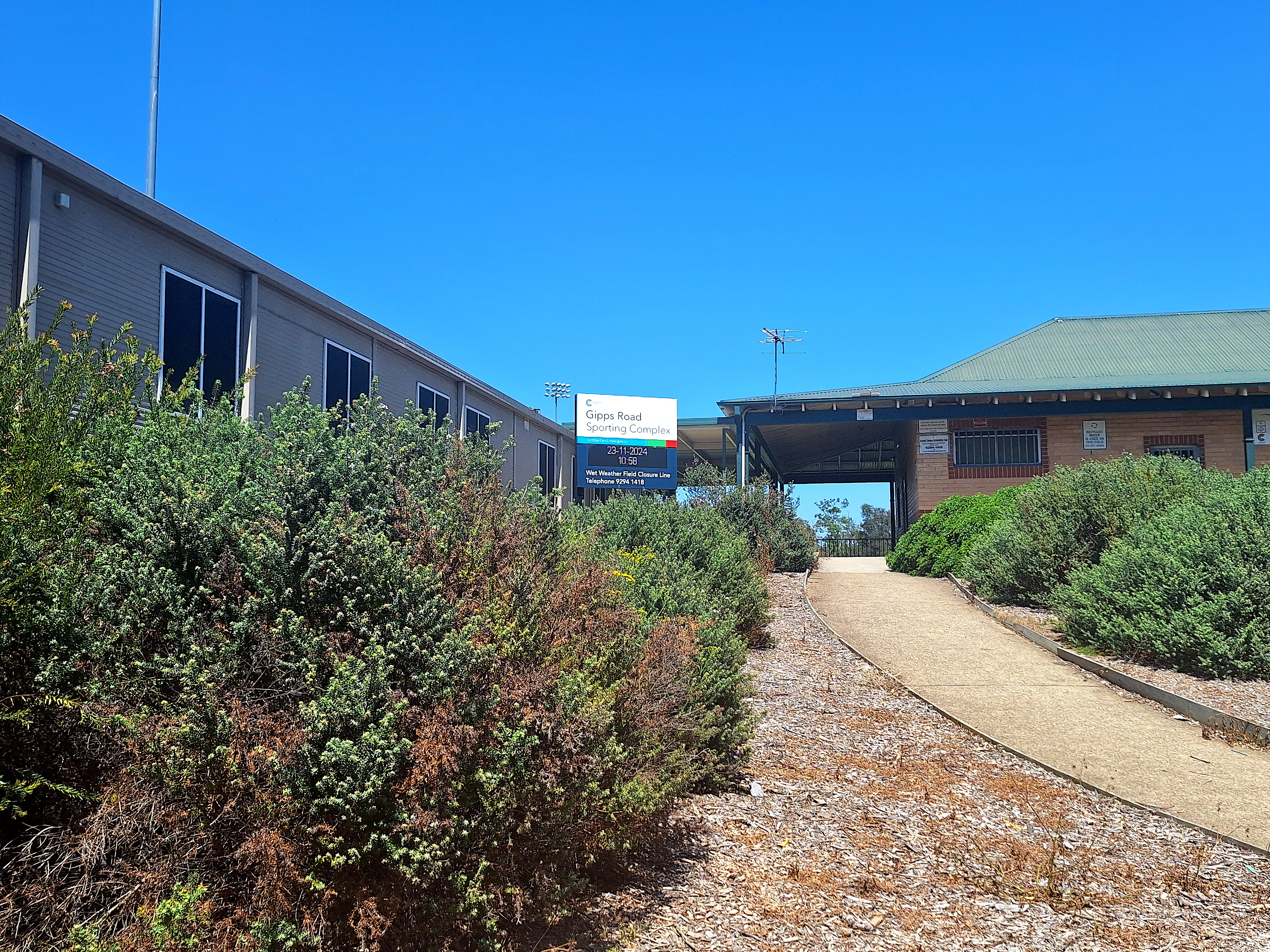
Entrance to the sports clubhouse

Gipps Road Sporting Complex (Gipps Road Park) features toilets, over 70 parking spaces, change rooms, athletics amenities block (which has a gym), a demountable AFL clubhouse, a shared walking and cycling path, a floodlit multisport field (for athletics, football and soccer), a children's playground, barbeque facilities, baseball dugouts, and general fencing. Ten major sports groups and clubs use the park on a regular basis. AFL usage runs from April to September (generally autumn-winter), athletics usage runs from September to March (spring-summer) and baseball usage occurs in winter months.

Hyland Road Park features a heritage house, Holroyd Youth Services, a rifle range and a pigeon club building. Hyland Road Park is currently devoid of any sports facilities, but an indoor centre, an outdoor sports court, cricket and soccer fields were proposed in 2013. The park also features remnants of Cumberland Plain Woodland in the eastern border, with bicycle and pedestrian access from Hyland Road. The visual attraction of Hyland Road Reserve is defined by minor vegetation amalgamated with open grass zones. The pedestrian access to Hyland Road Reserve is limited to a dirt track from the neighboring cycleway and Hyland Road.

In 2013, there was a proposal to build a marae (a cultural centre for the Māori people) on the northern area of Hyland Road Park. If built, it will be the first of its kind outside of New Zealand. In 2022, Cumberland City Council put in place a 20-year lease with the Sydney Marae Alliance to construct the marae in Hyland Road Reserve.

== Gallery ==
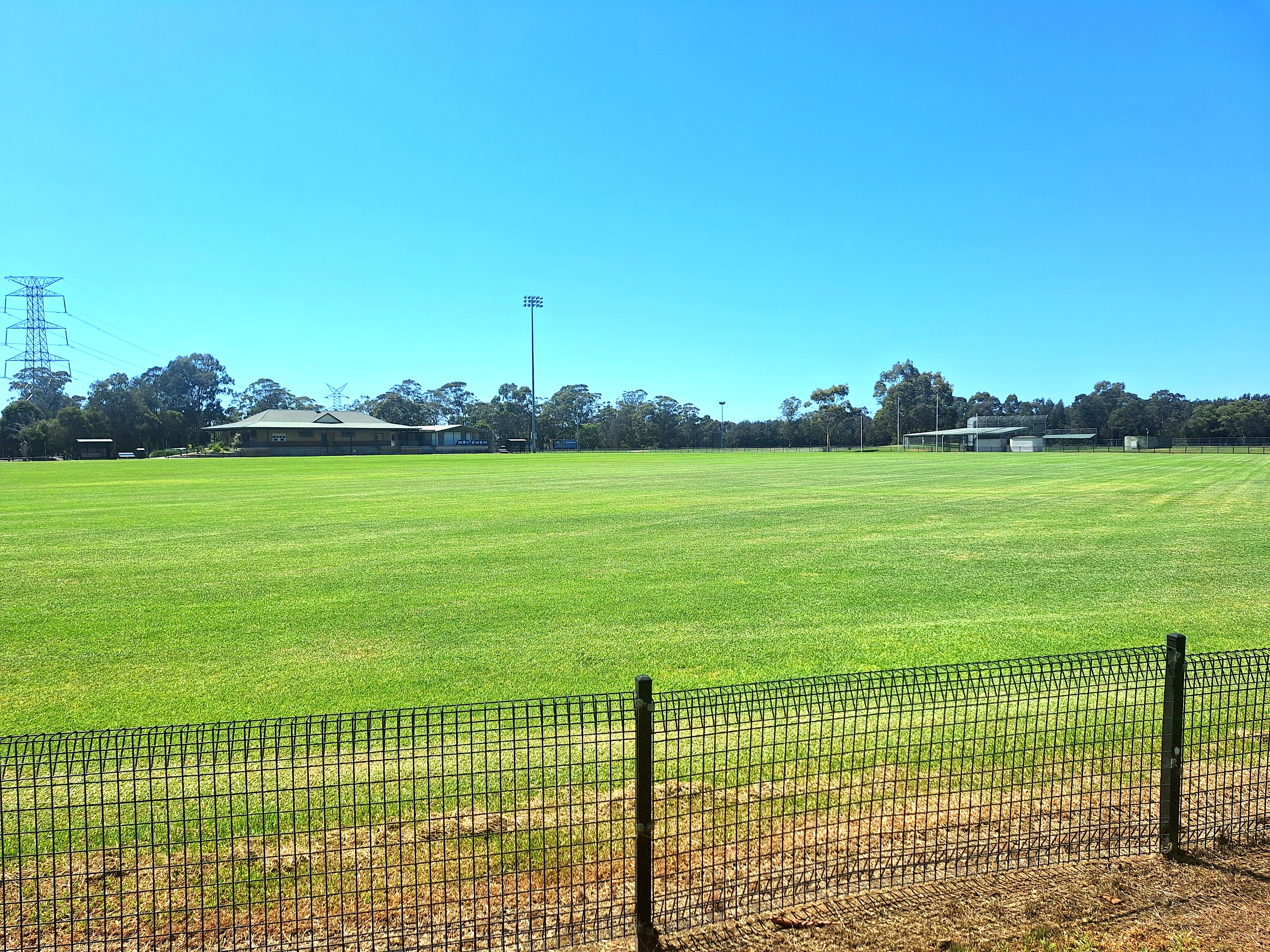
AFL field looking towards the clubhouse

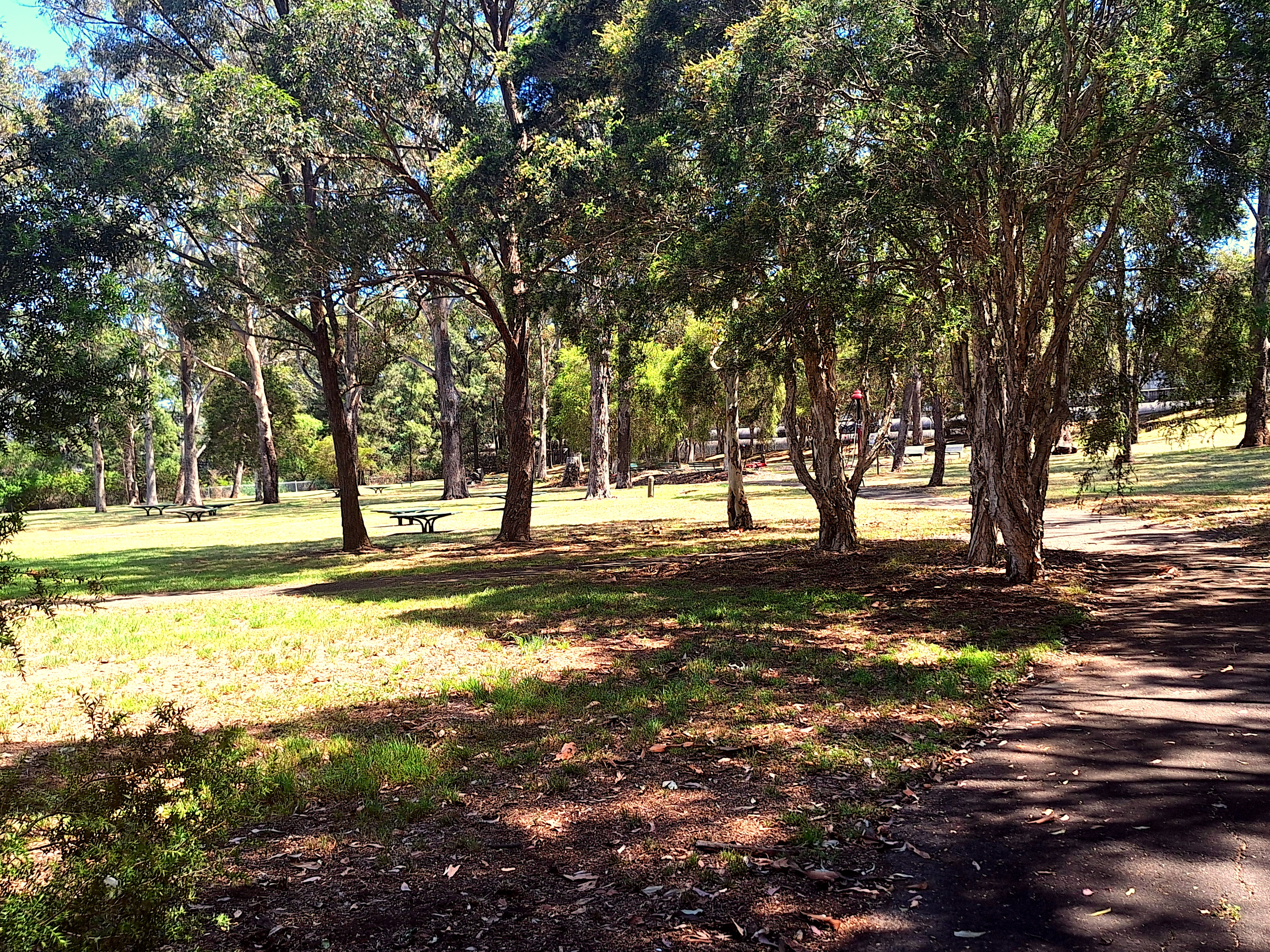
Picnic zone at Jack Ferguson Reserve

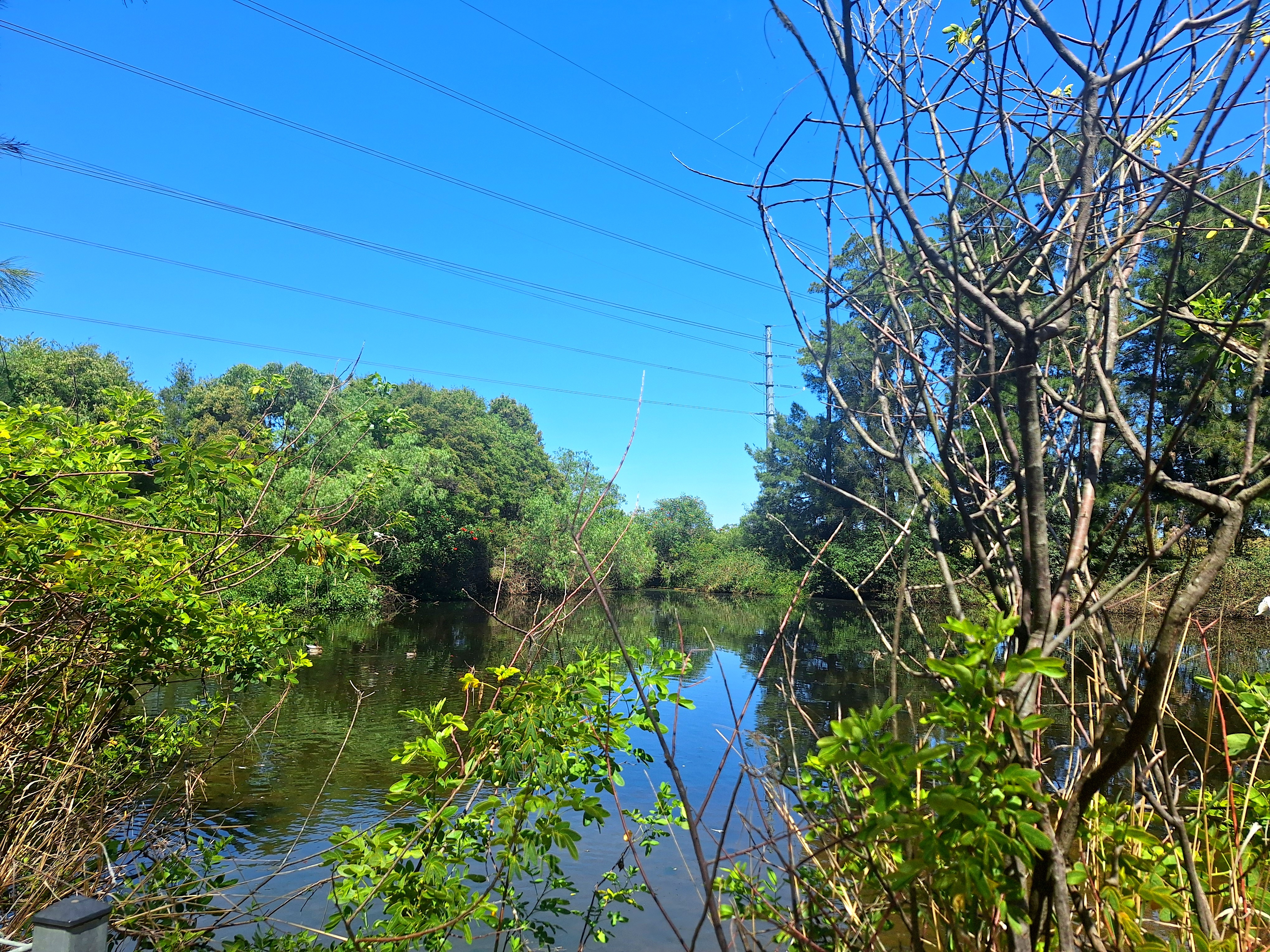
The pond at Jack Ferguson Reserve

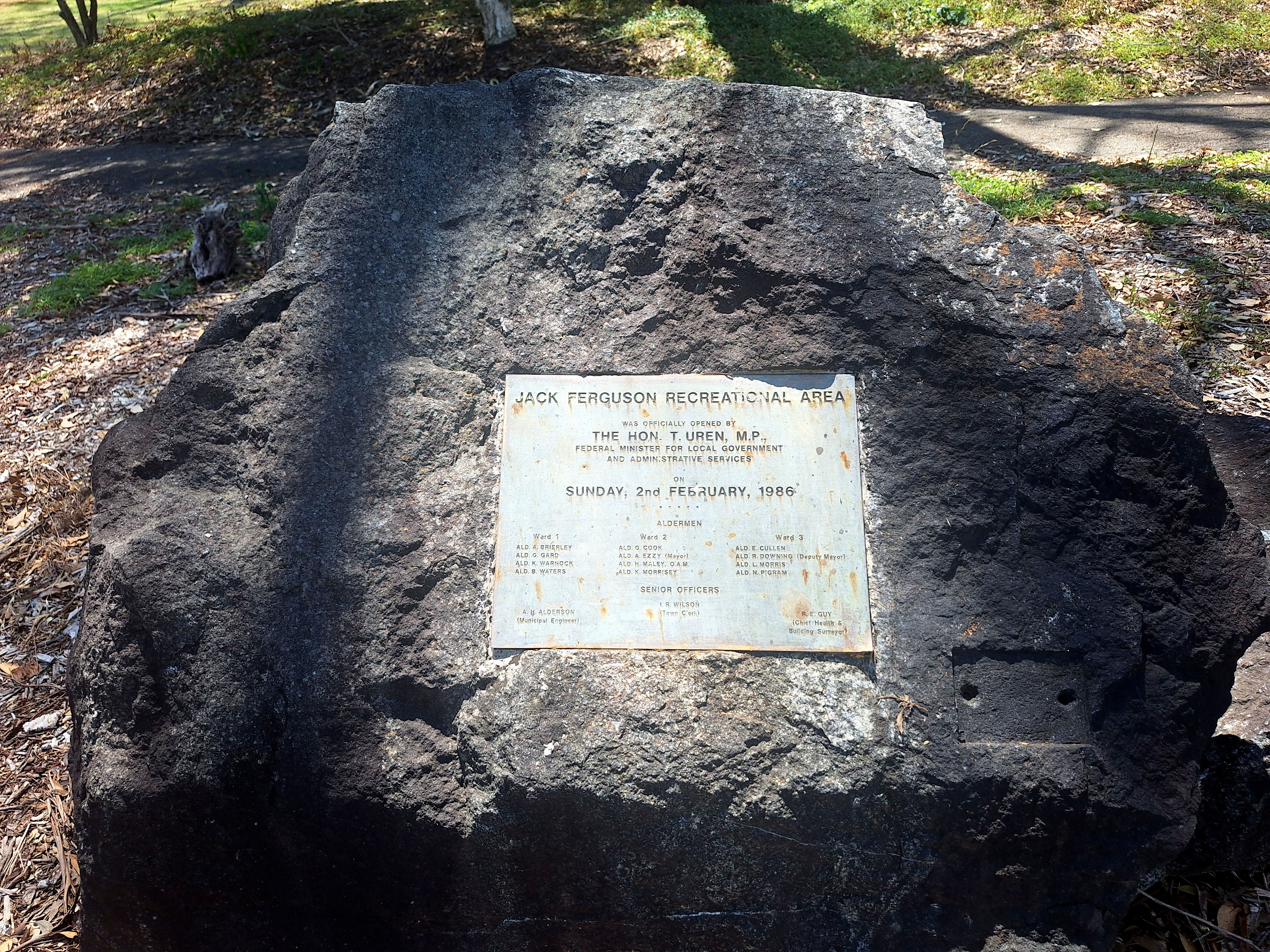
A commemorative plaque in Jack Ferguson Recreational Area/Reserve

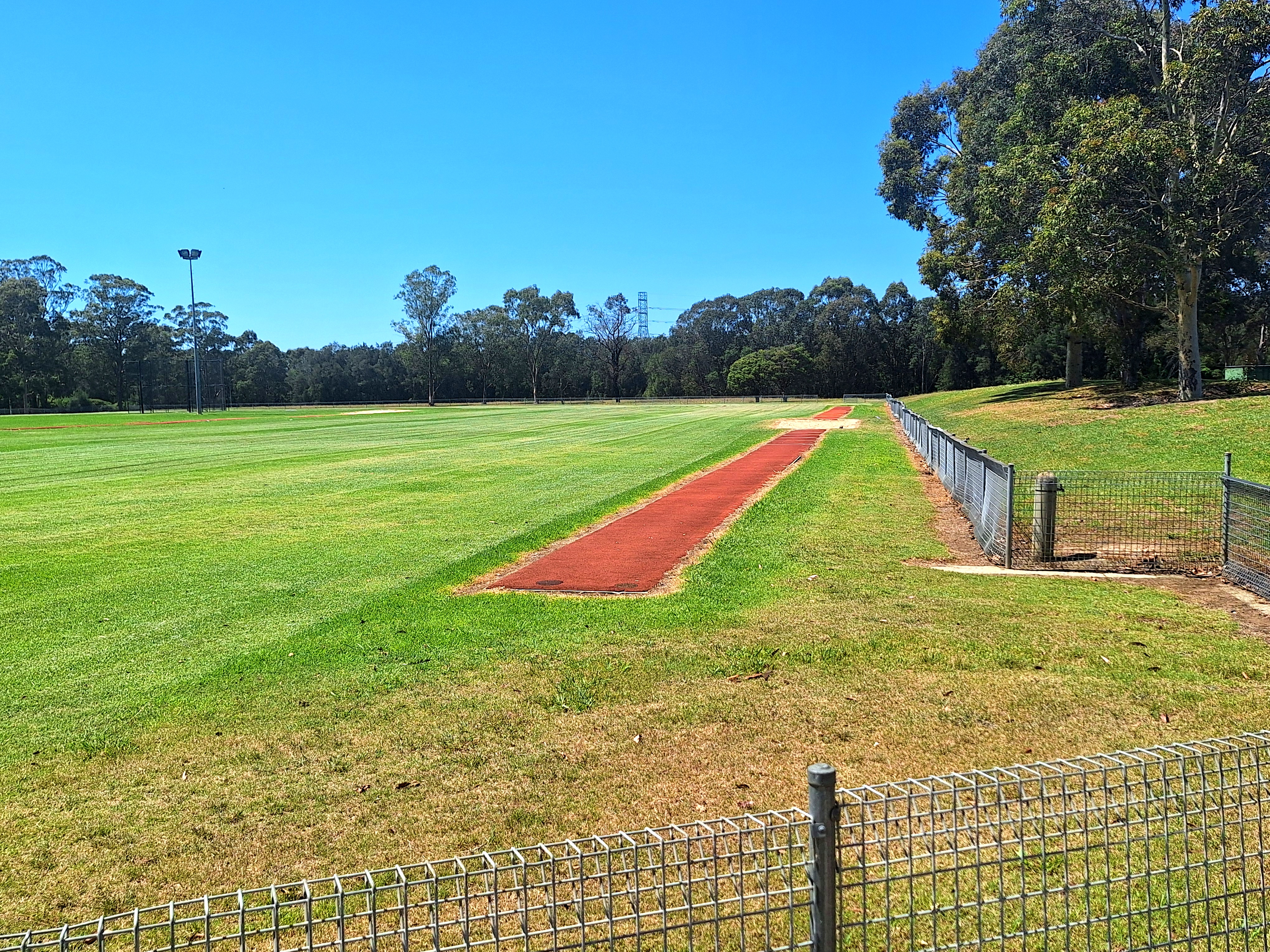
Long jump runway

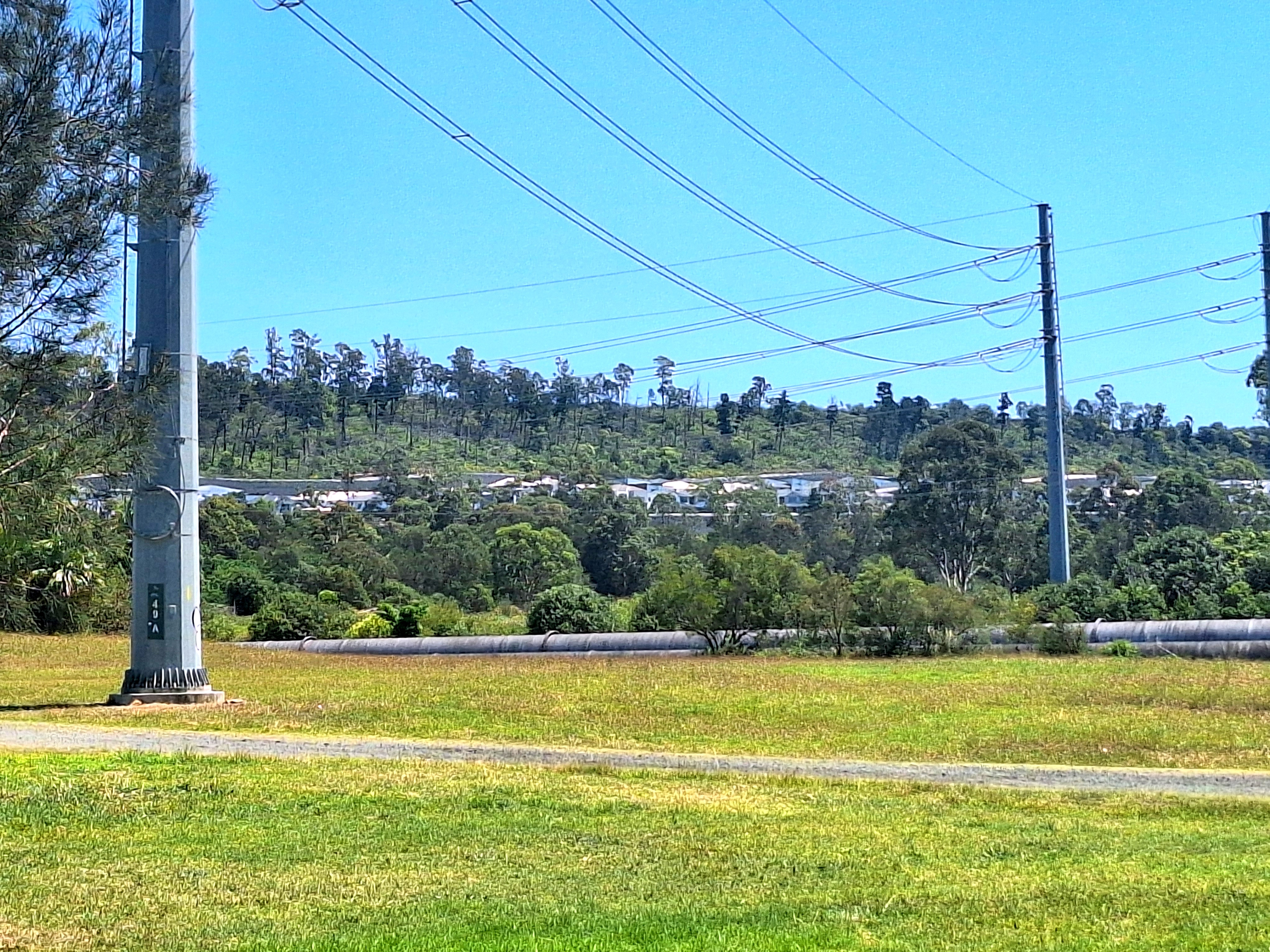
The bushland and pipeline at Hyland Road Park/Reserve with Pemulwuy residential zone in background

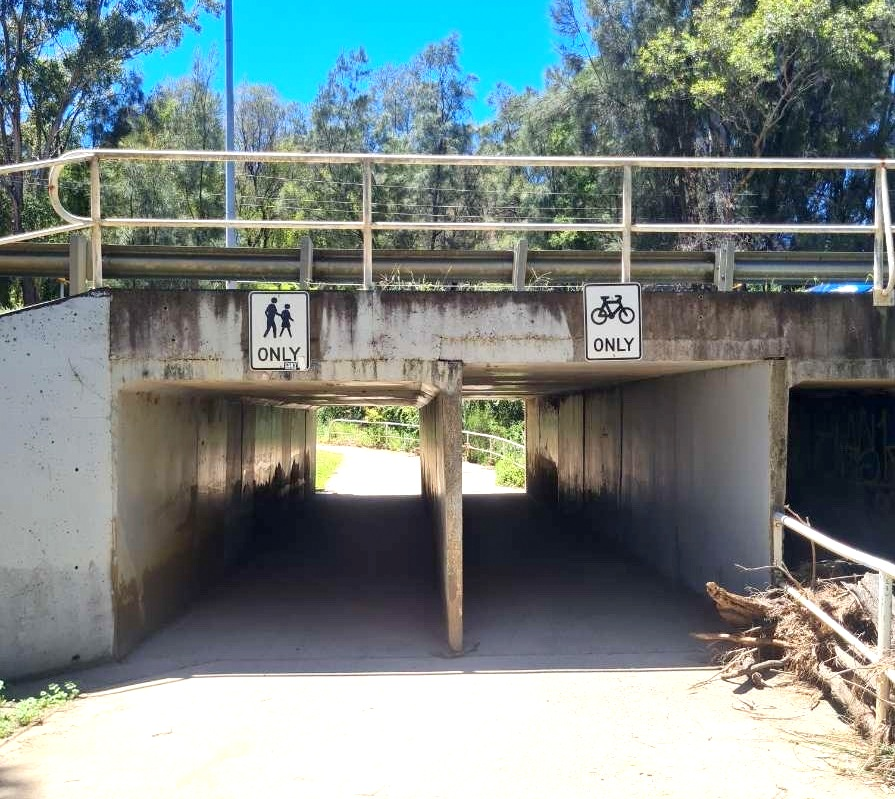
The subway beneath Gipps Road that connects the parklands to Rosford Street Reserve

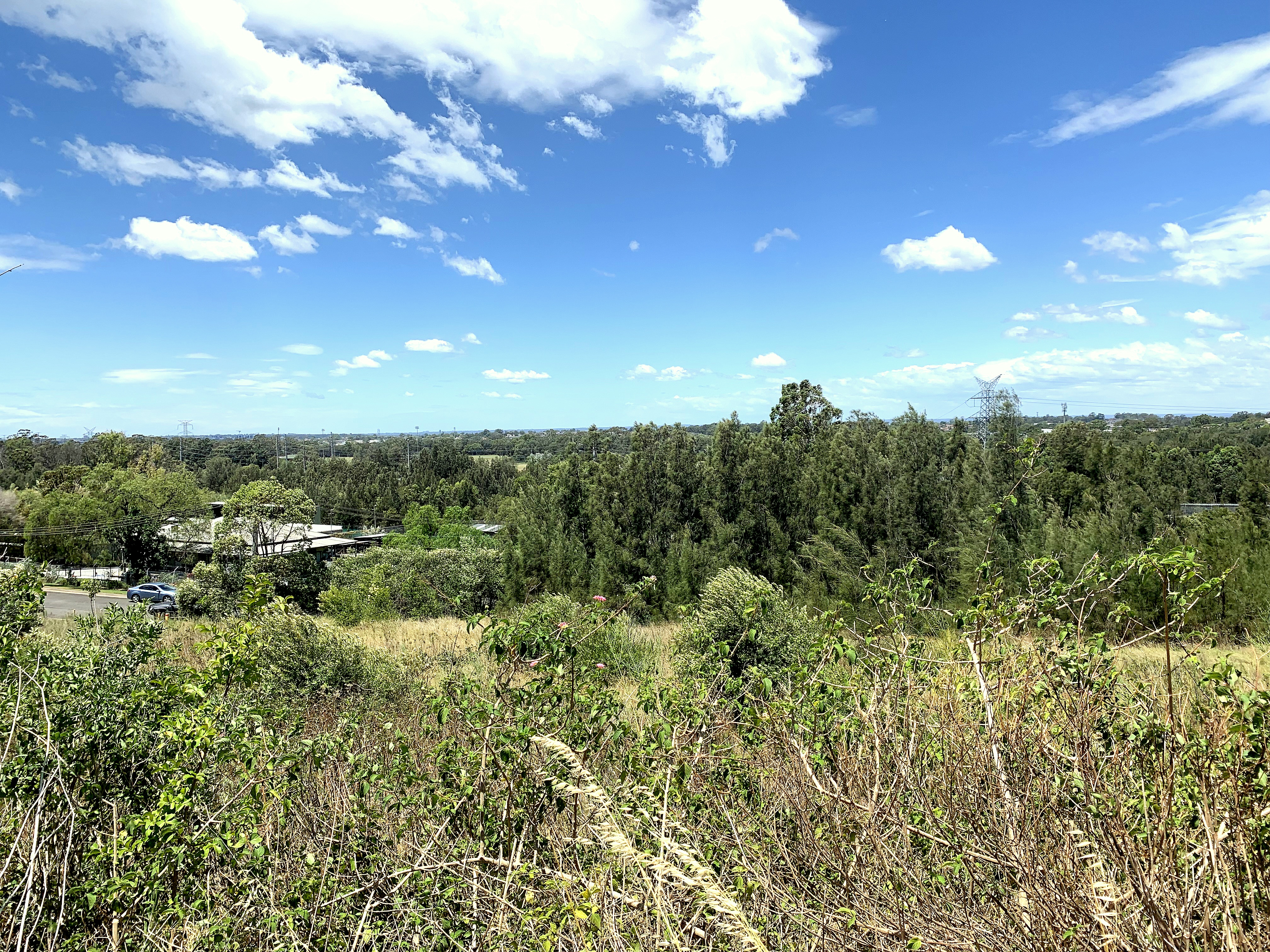
Looking north from the Lower Prospect Canal Reserve towards the parkland, with Hyland Road visible on the left

== See also ==
- Grey Box Reserve
- Western Sydney Regional Park
- Lower Prospect Canal Reserve
- Prospect Nature Reserve
- Marrong Reserve
