= Phandroid =

- Available in: English
- Owner: Nicholas Gray
- Website: www.phandroid.com
- Commercial: Yes
- Launched: November 2007
- Current status: Online

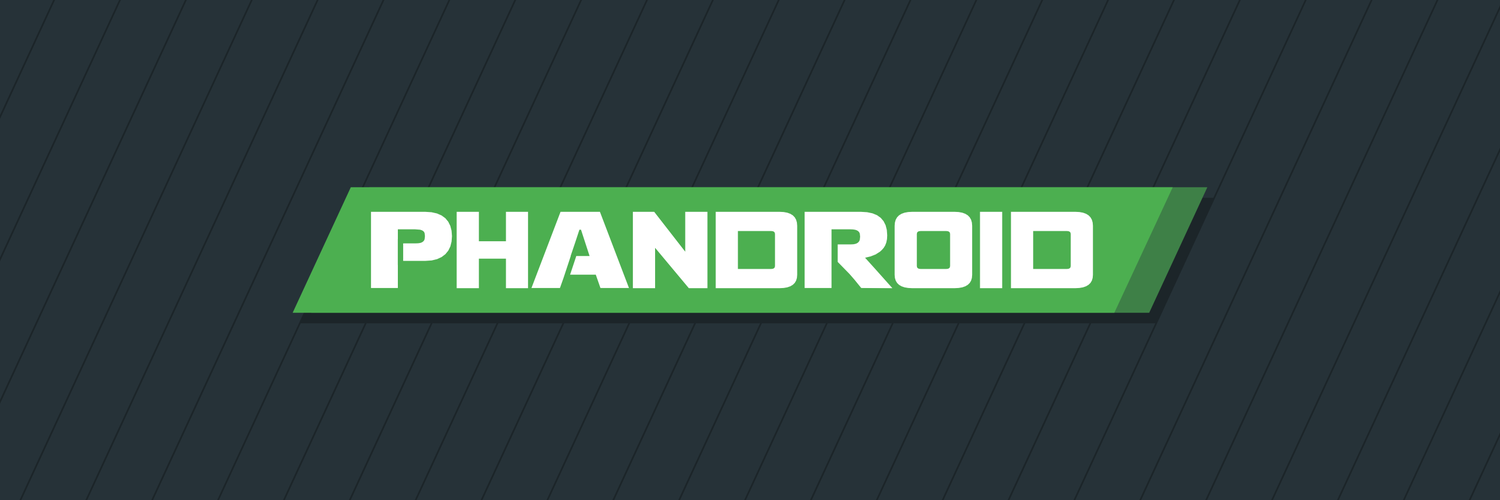
Phandroid logo

Phandroid is the first website dedicated to reporting on the Android operating system for phones. The website produces a variety of content, including news, reviews, editorials, videos, and a podcast. Phandroid has evolved to cover news from Google in general, as well as Android TV, Android Wear, Google Glass, Chromecast, and Android Auto. Phandroid also operates AndroidForums.com, a forum for Android users.

== History ==
Phandroid was launched in November 2007, 11 months before the HTC Dream was released. On November 6, 2007, Wired.com published an article titled "Android Already Has Phandroids." Due to the Wired article and growing interest in Android, the site saw massive growth overnight. Phandroid broke numerous Android-related exclusive stories over the years, including an early look at Android 2.3 Gingerbread. Despite its place as the oldest operating Android site, it has declined in recent years and is no longer actively maintained.

Phandroid has appeared on Engadget, The Verge, TechCrunch, and more.

In 2018, the owner of Phandroid.com announced the site was for sale and would cease operating as a traditional Android news blog. By March, the site lost all of its editors and stopped publishing news until it was sold at the end of the year. In the beginning of 2019, Phandroid restarted its tech news coverage with Nicholas Gray as the new Editor in Chief.
