= Indigofera australis =

Australian indigo

Scientific classification
- Kingdom: Plantae
- Clade: Tracheophytes
- Clade: Angiosperms
- Clade: Eudicots
- Clade: Rosids
- Order: Fabales
- Family: Fabaceae
- Subfamily: Faboideae
- Genus: Indigofera
- Species: I. australis

Binomial name
- Indigofera australis Willd.
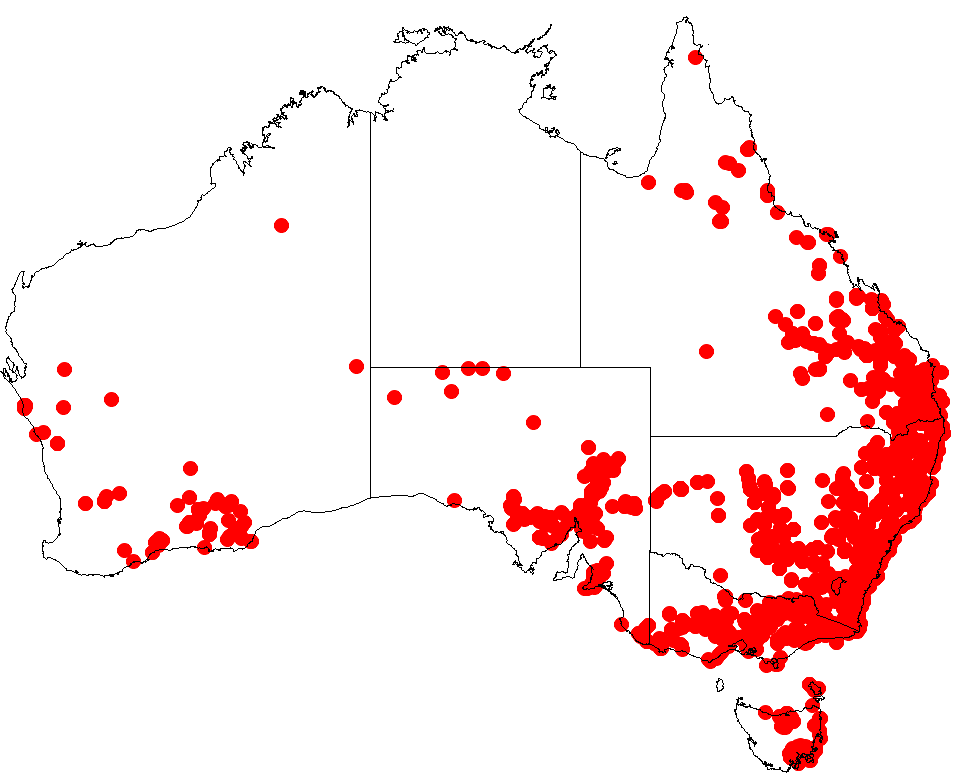

Synonyms
- Anil australis A.D.Chapm. orth. var.; Anila australis (Willd.) Kuntze; Indigofera angulata Lindl. nom. illeg.; Indigofera australis Vent. nom. illeg.; Indigofera lindleyana Spreng. ex Steud. nom. illeg.; Indigofera sylvatica Sieber ex Spreng.

Species of plant

Indigofera australis commonly known as Australian indigo, Austral indigo, native indigo or hill indigo, is a species of flowering plant in the family Fabaceae and is endemic to Australia. It is an erect, spreading shrub with pinnate leaves, pink to purple flowers and terete pods.

== Description ==
Indigofera australis is an erect, spreading shrub that typically grows to a height of up to 2.5 m (8 ft 2 in) high and wide, with arching branches and flexible stems. The leaves are pinnate, 40–100 mm (1.6–3.9 in) long, usually openly spaced on the stems, with usually 7 to 25 oblong to elliptic leaflets 10–40 mm (0.39–1.57 in) long, 5–9 mm (0.20–0.35 in) wide with a small point on the tip. There are lance-shaped stipules up to 4 mm (0.16 in) long at the base of the leaf. The flowers are borne in groups of more than five, each flower on a pedicel about 2 mm (0.079 in) long with a triangular brown bract 0.5–1 mm (0.020–0.039 in) long. The sepals are 2.0–2.5 mm (0.079–0.098 in) long, shorter than the sepal tube and covered with hairs pressed against the surface. The petals are pink to purple or lilac, the standard petal egg-shaped, sometimes with the narrower end towards the base, or round, 6–8 mm (0.24–0.31 in) long and 5.5–9 mm (0.22–0.35 in) wide, the wings 6–11 mm (0.24–0.43 in) long and the keel 6–10 mm (0.24–0.39 in) long. Flowering mostly occurs from July to September, and the pods are terete, more or less glabrous, mostly 25–45 mm (0.98–1.77 in) long with about 8 to 10 spotted seeds.

== Taxonomy ==
Indigofera australis was first formally described in 1802 by Carl Ludwig Willdenow in Species Plantarum. The specific epithet (australis) refers to its origin in Australia. In 2010, Peter Gordon Wilson and Ross Robert Mackerras described two subspecies of I. australis, and the names are accepted by the Australian Plant Census:

- Indigofera australis Willd. subsp. australis (the type subspecies)
- Indigofera australis subsp. hesperia Peter G.Wilson & Rowe is distinguished from the type subspecies, by its smaller (5–10 mm (0.20–0.39 in), more numerous (17 to 25) leaflets (compared to 17 to 21), and stipule bases swollen by masses of multicellular hairs.

== Distribution and habitat ==
This species of indigofera grows in a variety of habitats, mainly in woodland and eucalypt forest, and commonly on hills in all states of Australia, but not the Northern Territory. It is widespread from northern Queensland, south through New South Wales and Victoria to Tasmania, and west through South Australia to Western Australia. Like many plants in the pea family, Indigofera australis is nitrogen fixing. The flowers are a pollen and nectar source for many native insects, including bees and wasps. The plant is a useful food plant for butterfly larvae (caterpillars):

- Freyeria trochylus – "Grass Jewel"
- Eurema hecabe – "Common Grass Yellow"
- Lampides boeticus – "Long-tailed Pea Blue"
- Zizina labradus – "Common Grass-blue"

== Uses ==
=== Indigenous use ===
First Nations Australians are said to crush the leaves and added these to water to kill or stun fish and eels.

=== In horticulture ===
This species is cultivated as an ornamental, and used in native plant landscaping.

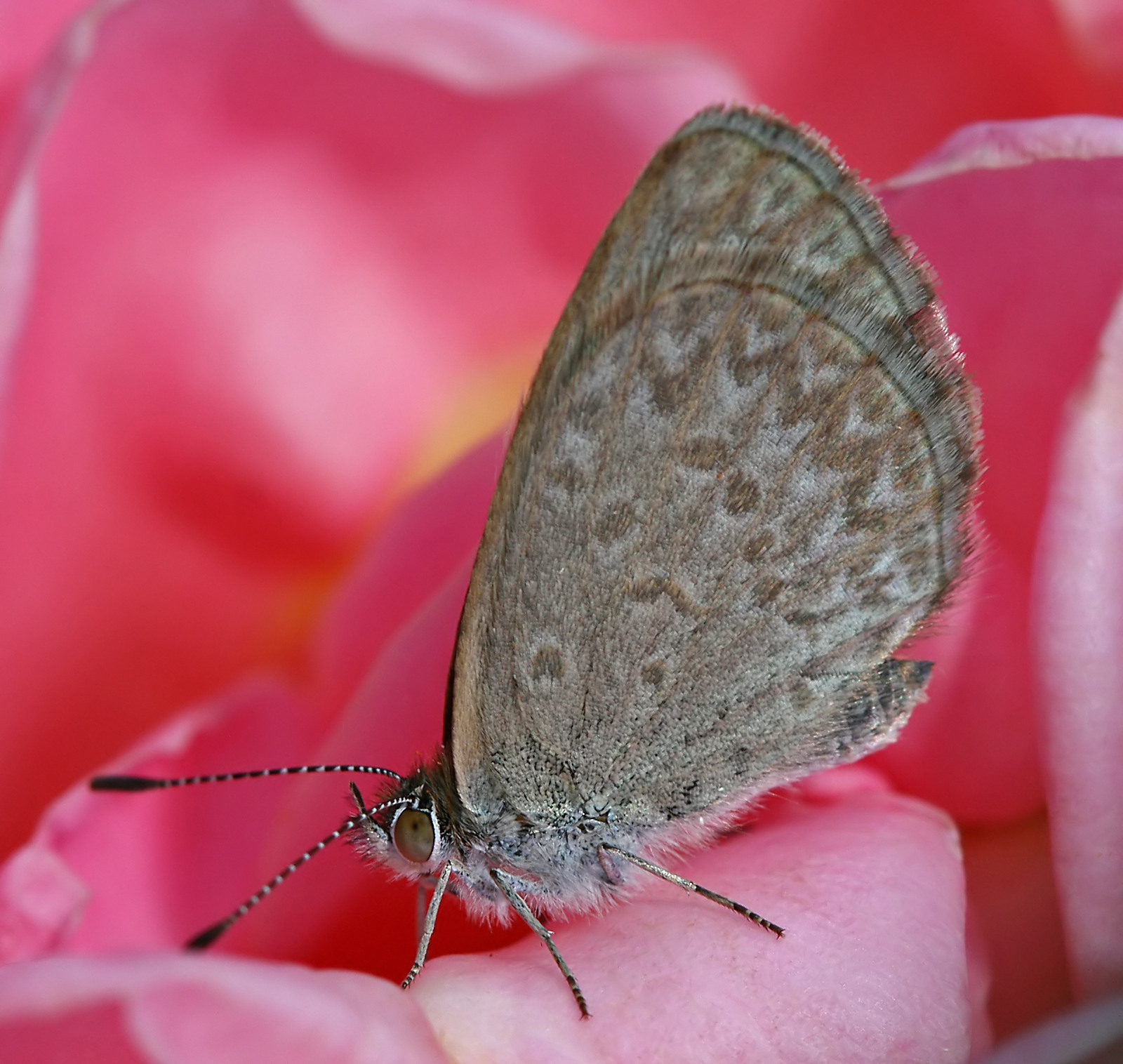
Common Grass Blue butterfly

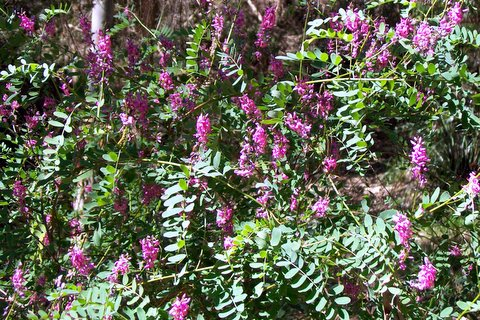
Australian indigo growing at Eastwood, New South Wales
