= Bible Belt (disambiguation) =

The Bible Belt is a region of the Southern United States and the Midwestern state of Missouri, where evangelical Protestantism exerts a strong social and cultural influence.

Bible Belt may also refer to:

- Bible Belt (Netherlands) (Dutch: bijbelgordel or biblebelt), a strip of land in the Netherlands with the highest concentration of conservative orthodox Reformed Protestants in the country
- Bible Belt (Norway) (Norwegian: bibelbeltet), a loosely defined southwestern coastal area of Norway, which is more religiously observant than most of the rest of the country
- Bible Belt (Sweden) (Swedish: bibelbältet), a region centered on Jönköping in northern Småland where demographics show that people are characteristically more religious

== Music ==
- Bible Belt (album), a 2009 album by Diane Birch
- "Bible Belt", a song by Travis Tritt from the 1991 album It's All About to Change

== See also ==
- Quran Belt, a region where Islamic values are strong
