= Bible Belt =

Cultural region of the United States

- Cultural region of the United States
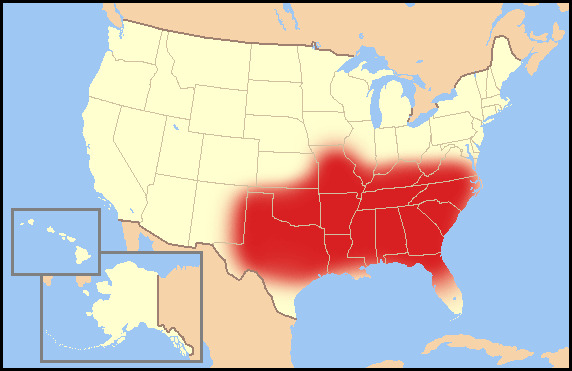
- Approximate boundaries of the Bible Belt
- Country: United States
- States: Alabama; Arkansas; Georgia; Kentucky; Mississippi; North Carolina; Oklahoma; South Carolina; Tennessee and parts of: Florida; Illinois; Indiana; Iowa; Kansas; Louisiana; Missouri; New Mexico; Ohio; Texas; Virginia; West Virginia

The Bible Belt is a region of the Southern United States, the Midwestern state of Missouri, and the Mid-Atlantic states of Virginia and West Virginia (which all have significant Southern influence), where evangelical Protestantism exerts a strong social and cultural influence. The region has been described as the most socially conservative across the United States due to a significant impact of Protestant Christianity on politics and culture. The region is known to have a higher church attendance, more evangelical Protestant denominations, and greater emphasis on traditional religious values compared to other parts of the country. The region contrasts with the religiously diverse Midwest and Great Lakes and the Mormon corridor in Utah, southern Idaho, and northern Arizona.

Whereas the states with the highest percentage of residents identifying as non-religious are in the West and New England regions of the United States (with Vermont ranking the highest at 46%), in the Bible Belt state of South Carolina it is just 16%; Mississippi and Arkansas both report 18% of their people to be religiously unaffiliated. Arkansas has the highest proportion of evangelical Protestants, at 50%. The evangelical influence is strongest in Alabama, Georgia, Florida, Mississippi, Arkansas, Tennessee, Kentucky, southern Missouri, Western North Carolina, the Upstate region of South Carolina, Oklahoma, North Louisiana, northern and eastern Texas, southern and western Virginia, and West Virginia.

The earliest known usage of the term "Bible Belt" was by American journalist and social commentator H. L. Mencken, who in 1924 wrote in the Chicago Daily Tribune: "The old game, I suspect, is beginning to play out in the Bible Belt." In 1927, Mencken claimed the term as his invention. The term is now also used in other countries for regions with higher religious doctrine adoption.

== In the United States ==
=== Geography ===
The name "Bible Belt" has been applied historically to the South and parts of the Midwest, but is more commonly identified with the South. It encompasses both the Deep South (South Carolina, Georgia, Alabama, Mississippi, and most of Louisiana), the Upland South (North Carolina, Tennessee, Kentucky, Arkansas, and Oklahoma), and the southern part of the Mid-Atlantic (the Virginias). In a 1961 study, Wilbur Zelinsky delineated the region as the area in which Protestant denominations, especially Southern Baptist, Methodist, and evangelical, are the predominant religious affiliations.

The region also includes most of Texas and North Florida, and extends east to include most of Virginia outside of Northern Virginia. In addition, the Bible Belt covers Missouri south of the Missouri River (i.e. the Ozarks), as well as Southern Indiana and Southern Ohio along the Ohio River.

On the other hand, areas in the South which are not considered part of the Bible Belt include heavily Catholic Southern Louisiana, religiously diverse Central and South Florida, overwhelmingly Hispanic South Texas and Trans-Pecos, and Northern Virginia in the Washington metropolitan area. A 1978 study by Charles Heatwole identified the Bible Belt as the region dominated by 24 fundamentalist Protestant denominations, (including Baptist and Methodist denominations), corresponding to essentially the same area mapped by Zelinsky.

According to Stephen W. Tweedie, an Associate Professor Emeritus in the Department of Geography at Oklahoma State University, the Bible Belt was viewed in terms of numerical concentration of the audience for religious television when he first published his research in 1995. He finds two belts: one more eastern that stretches from North Florida through Georgia, Alabama, Tennessee, Kentucky, Southside Virginia, and the Carolinas; and another concentrated in Texas (excluding El Paso and South Texas), Arkansas, Louisiana, (excluding New Orleans and Acadiana), Oklahoma, Missouri (excluding Kansas City and St. Louis), and Mississippi. "[H]is research also broke the Bible Belt into two core regions, a western region and an eastern region." Tweedie's western Bible Belt was focused on a core that extended from Little Rock, Arkansas, to Tulsa, Oklahoma. His eastern Bible Belt was focused on a core that included the major population centers of Alabama, Georgia, and Tennessee.

A study by the Pew Research Center in 2016 found that the ten most religious states were Alabama, Mississippi, Tennessee, Louisiana, Arkansas, South Carolina, West Virginia, Georgia, Oklahoma and North Carolina. A 2014 study by the Pew Research Center found that the states with the highest belief in the Bible as the literal word of God were Mississippi (56%), Alabama (51%), South Carolina (49%), West Virginia (47%), Tennessee (46%), Arkansas (45%), Louisiana (44%), Georgia (41%), Kentucky (41%), and Texas (39%).

The Bible belt roughly coincides with the Diabetes belt, the Teenage Pregnancy belt and the Obesity belt.

==== By state ====
Percentage of respondents in the USA stating that religion is "Very important" or "Somewhat important" in their lives, 2014

Proportion of Evangelical Protestants per state in the American South
State	Baptist	Pentecostal	Restorationist	Presbyterian	Other	Total	Share indicating religion is "Very Important"
Alabama	24%	3%	1%	1%	14%	43%	77%
Arkansas	23%	6%	3%	1%	17%	50%	70%
Delaware	4%	3%	1%	1%	10%	19%	46%
Washington, D.C.	3%	1%	1%	2%	7%	14%	50%
Florida	7%	2%	1%	1%	11%	22%	53%
Georgia	17%	3%	1%	1%	11%	33%	64%
Kentucky	22%	8%	3%	1%	12%	46%	63%
Louisiana	15%	4%	3%	1%	10%	33%	71%
Maryland	4%	2%	1%	1%	7%	15%	50%
Mississippi	29%	2%	2%	1%	8%	42%	74%
Missouri	11%	2%	2%	1%	15%	31%	56%
North Carolina	19%	3%	1%	1%	11%	35%	62%
Oklahoma	19%	8%	4%	1%	15%	47%	64%
South Carolina	21%	2%	1%	2%	13%	39%	69%
Tennessee	24%	3%	4%	1%	13%	45%	71%
Texas	10%	4%	2%	1%	10%	27%	63%
Virginia	11%	3%	1%	1%	9%	25%	60%
West Virginia	17%	6%	2%	1%	11%	37%	64%

==== Other Bible Belts in the United States ====
In addition to the South, there is a smaller Bible Belt in West Michigan, centered on the heavily Dutch-influenced cities of Holland and Grand Rapids. Christian colleges in that region include Calvin University, Hope College, Cornerstone University, Grace Christian University, and Kuyper College. Much like the South, West Michigan is generally fiscally and socially conservative.

There is also a Bible Belt in the western suburbs of Chicago (especially in DuPage County), centered on Wheaton. Christian colleges in that region include Wheaton College, North Central College, Northern Baptist Theological Seminary, and Elmhurst University. Christian publishing houses in that region include Crossway, InterVarsity Press, and Tyndale House. Carol Stream is home to the headquarters of Christianity Today.

Colorado Springs, Colorado, could be considered a Bible belt due to the large amount of prominent evangelical organizations headquartered there including Focus on the Family, Compassion International, The Navigators, David C. Cook, Young Life, Biblica, and others, even though it has low church attendance compared to other Bible belts.

=== History ===
During the colonial period (1607–1776), the South was a stronghold of the Anglican church. Its transition to a stronghold of non-Anglican Protestantism occurred gradually over the next century as a series of religious revival movements, many associated with the Methodist and Baptist denominations, gained great popularity in the region.

The northern colonial Bible Belt (especially New England with its Puritan heritage) frequently performed missionary work in the South. The centre of Baptist activity in early America was in the Middle Colonies. In 1707 five churches in New Jersey, Pennsylvania, and Delaware assembled together and established the Philadelphia Baptist Association, one of the oldest Baptist regional associations in America, and through the new ecclesiastical body they embarked upon vigorous missionary activity. By 1760 the Philadelphia Baptist Association included churches located in the present states of Connecticut, New York, New Jersey, Pennsylvania, Delaware, Virginia, and West Virginia; and by 1767 further multiplication of churches had necessitated the formation of two subsidiary regional associations, the Warren Baptist Association in New England and the Ketochton Baptist Association in Virginia. The Philadelphia Association also provided leadership in organizing the Charleston Baptist Association in the Carolinas in 1751."

An influential figure was Shubal Stearns: "Shubael Stearns, a New England Separate Baptist, migrated to Sandy Creek, North Carolina, in 1755 and initiated a revival that quickly penetrated the entire Piedmont region. The churches he organized were brought together in 1758 to form the Sandy Creek Association". Stearns was brother-in-law of Daniel Marshall, who was born in Windsor, Connecticut and "is generally considered the first great Baptist leader in Georgia. He founded Kiokee Baptist Church, the oldest continuing Baptist congregation in the state". Also, Wait Palmer, of Toland, Connecticut, may have influenced African American Christianity in the South: "The Silver Bluff, South Carolina, revival was a seminal development, whose role among blacks rivalled that played by the Sandy Creek revival of the Separate Baptists, to which it was indirectly related. It was probably the same Wait Palmer who had baptized Shubal Stearns in 1751 who came to Silver Bluff in 1775, baptizing and constituting a church. Abraham Marshall, who encouraged the later offshoots, was a Separate Baptist of the Sandy Creek school. The revival at the Silver Bluff plantation of George Galphin (some twelve miles from Augusta, Georgia) had brought David George to the Afro-Baptist faith and had provided a ministry for George Liele".

According to Thomas P. Kidd, "As early as 1758, Sandy Creek missionaries helped organize a slave congregation, the Bluestone Church, on the plantation of William Byrd III, which may have been the first independently functioning African American church in North America. The church did not last long, but it reflected the Baptists' commitment to evangelizing African Americans". According to Gayraud S. Wilmore, "The preaching of New England Congregationalists such as Jonathan Edwards about the coming millennium, and his conviction that Christians were called to prepare for it, reached the slaves through the far-ranging missionary work of white evangelists such as Shubal Stearns, Wait Palmer, and Matthew Moore - all of whom left Congregationalism and became Separatist Baptist preachers in the plantation country of Virginia, North and South Carolina, and Georgia".

=== "Buckle of the Bible Belt" ===
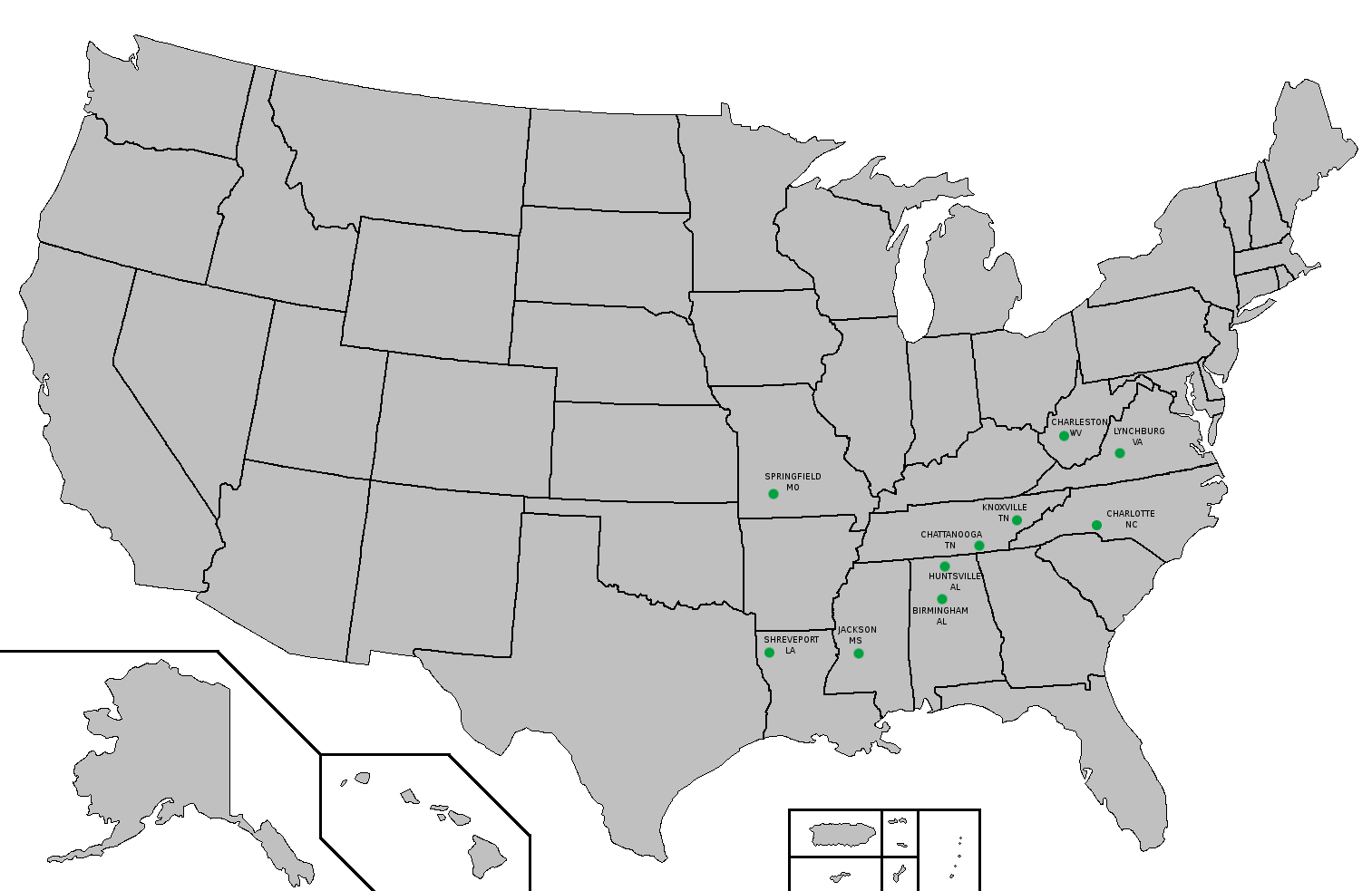
Bible-minded cities map

A study was commissioned by the American Bible Society to survey the importance of the Bible in the metropolitan areas of the United States. The report was based on 42,855 interviews conducted between 2005 and 2012. It determined the 10 most "Bible-minded" cities were Knoxville, Tennessee; Shreveport, Louisiana; Chattanooga, Tennessee; Birmingham, Alabama; Jackson, Mississippi; Springfield, Missouri; Charlotte, North Carolina; Lynchburg, Virginia; Huntsville-Decatur, Alabama; and Charleston, West Virginia.

Several locations are occasionally referred to as "the Buckle of the Bible Belt":

- Abilene, Texas, a city of 117,000, is home to three Protestant universities: the Baptist affiliated Hardin–Simmons University, the Church of Christ's Abilene Christian University, and Methodist-founded McMurry University.
- Charlotte, North Carolina, is the birthplace of Billy Graham. The Billy Graham Evangelistic Association, Wycliffe Bible Translators' JAARS Center, SIM Missions Organization, and The Christian Research Institute make their homes in the Charlotte general area. The Baptist Peace Fellowship of North America is headquartered in Charlotte, and both Reformed Theological Seminary and Gordon-Conwell Theological Seminary have campuses there.
- Nashville, Tennessee, sometimes referred to as "the Protestant Vatican", has over 700 churches, several seminaries, and a number of Christian schools, colleges and universities, including Belmont University, Trevecca Nazarene University, Lipscomb University, Welch College and American Baptist College. Nashville is the seat of the National Baptist Convention, USA, Inc., the headquarters of the Southern Baptist Convention, the National Association of Free Will Baptists, the Gideons International, the Gospel Music Association, and Thomas Nelson, the world's largest producer of Bibles.
- Tulsa, Oklahoma, is a city where Protestant and, in particular, Southern Baptist, the Word of Faith movement, and other evangelical Christian traditions are very prominent. Tulsa is home to Oral Roberts University, Phillips Theological Seminary, and RHEMA Bible Training College (in the suburb of Broken Arrow). A number of prominent Protestant Christians have lived or studied in Tulsa, including Joel Osteen, Kenneth E. Hagin, Carlton Pearson, Kenneth Copeland, Billy Joe Daugherty, Smokie Norful, and Billy James Hargis. Tulsa is also home to a number of vibrant Mainline Protestant congregations. Some of these congregations were founded during the oil boom of the early twentieth century and their facilities are noted for striking architecture, such as the art deco Boston Avenue Methodist Church and First Presbyterian Church of Tulsa. The metropolitan area has at least four religious radio stations (KCFO, KNYD, KXOJ, & KPIM), and at least two religious TV stations (KWHB & KGEB).
- Greenville, South Carolina, is a city where many Baptist churches, particularly Independent Baptist, are located. There are more than one hundred Baptist churches in the Greenville area, as well as Bob Jones University. It also is the home of WTBI-FM radio station which plays old-fashioned Christian music and preaching 24 hours a day.

=== Political and cultural context ===
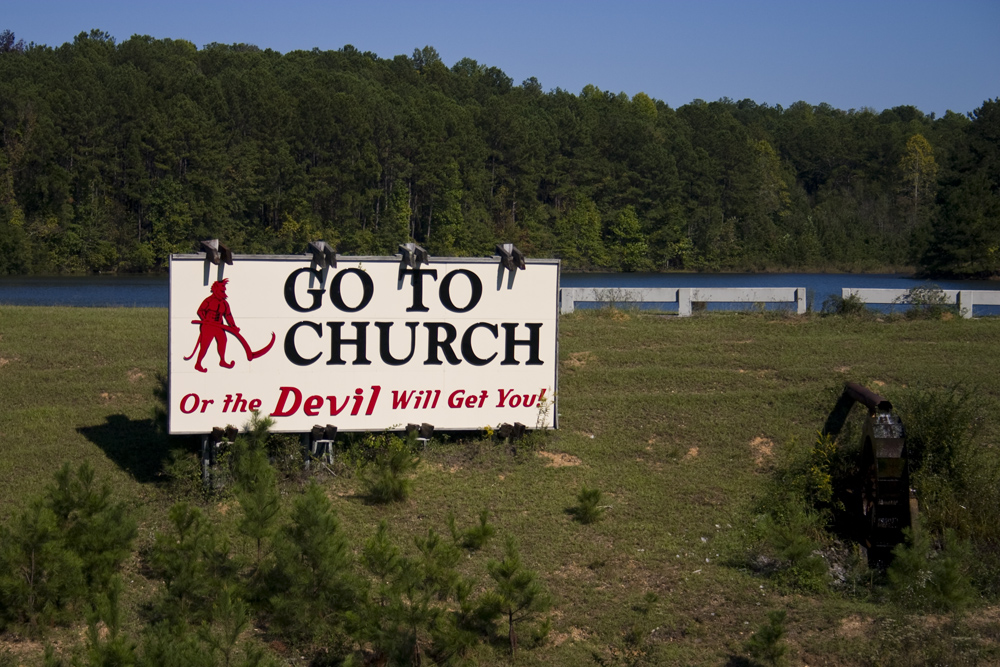
Billboard near the center of Alabama

Evangelical Protestantism in recent decades links to social conservatism. In 1950, President Harry S. Truman told Catholic leaders he wanted to send an ambassador to the Vatican. Truman said the leading Democrats in Congress approved, but they warned him, "it would defeat Democratic Senators and Congressmen in the Bible Belt."

In presidential elections, the Bible Belt states of Alabama, Mississippi, South Carolina, and Texas have voted for the Republican candidate in all elections since 1980; Oklahoma has supported the Republican presidential candidate in every election since 1968, with Republicans having carried every county in the state in all presidential elections since 2004. The states of Kentucky, Louisiana, West Virginia, Arkansas, Missouri, and Tennessee have voted for the Republican candidate in all elections since 1996.

However, with the exception of Mississippi, historical geographer Barry Vann shows that counties in the upland areas of the Appalachians and the Ozarks have a more conservative voting pattern than the counties located in the coastal plains.

During Republican presidential primaries, Christian Social Conservatives tend to win most states from the Bible Belt. In the 2008 Republican Party presidential primaries Mike Huckabee won most Bible Belt states. In the 2012 Republican Party presidential primaries Rick Santorum won most states. Both were Christian Social Conservatives. In the 2016 Republican Party presidential primaries Donald Trump won most of the states while Ted Cruz won few.

== Outside the United States ==
=== Australia ===
In Australia, the term "Bible Belt" has been used to refer to areas within individual cities, which have a high concentration of Christian residents usually centralized around a megachurch, for example:

- Formerly, the northwestern suburbs of Sydney focusing on The Hills District were traditionally known as the "Bible belt", where Hillsong Church is located. Between the 2011 and 2016 census, however, the Christian population of The Hills district reduced by 18.5% and those without a religion grew from 1 in 8 in 2006 to 1 in 5 in the 2016 census.
- The Greater Western Sydney area, typically in the City of Fairfield area, in the suburbs between Fairfield and Horsley Park, where the megachurches are St Hurmizd Church, an Assyrian Church of the East and the Apostle Chaldean Catholic Church, a Chaldean Catholic church. Other Bible belts include those with high Anglo-Saxon Protestant populations found in the Sutherland Shire, parts of City of Penrith, Camden Council and the Wollondilly Shire.
- The outer-eastern suburbs of Melbourne, where CityLife Church, Crossway Baptist Church, Stairway Church and Discovery Church are located.
- Melbourne's suburbs surrounding Melbourne Airport and Essendon Fields Airport.
- The City of Casey in the outer south-eastern suburbs of Melbourne, incorporating suburbs including Narre Warren, Cranbourne, Berwick, Pakenham, Endeavour Hills, Hampton Park and Hallam.
- The northeastern suburbs of Adelaide focusing on Paradise, Modbury and Golden Grove, where Influencers Church is located
- The Brisbane southern suburbs of Mansfield, Springwood, Carindale and Mount Gravatt.
- In 2017, the far northern suburbs of Perth were forming this reputation, with the focus being on One Church and Globalheart in the suburbs of Merriwa and Joondalup respectively.
- Toowoomba city in Queensland has long been regarded as fertile ground for Christian fundamentalist right-wing movements that adhere to biblical literalism, particularly those within the Pentecostal and charismatic stream of Christianity.

=== Canada ===
The province of Alberta has been referred to as Canada's Bible Belt due to its containing a significant population of Catholics, Anabaptists, and other Protestants. Certain areas of Canada's east coast region, such as the province of New Brunswick, also contain significant populations of Catholic, Baptist, Anglican, and United faith adherents, up to 85% overall. There is also a vast Bible belt across southern Manitoba.

=== Denmark ===
In Denmark, rural western Jutland in particular is considered to be the Bible Belt. This is due to the higher number of citizens who are associated (in this particular area) with conservative Lutheran Christian organizations such as the Church Association for the Inner Mission in Denmark, which traditionally have had a very strong resistance to abortion and LGBT rights. Today, the movement is strongest around Hedensted, Løsning, Korning, and Øster Snede. The Danish Oasis Movement, the YMCA, and Jehovah's Witnesses are also active in the area. The Evangelical Lutheran Free Church is active in Løsning and the Adventists in Vejle.

=== Estonia ===
Census results show religious belief in the country is more prevalent in the east running from north to south along the border with Russia, particularly in those areas with large populations of Russian Orthodox, Estonian Orthodox, and Orthodox Old Believers.

=== Finland ===
In North Ostrobothnia, Lapland, and Northern Savonia, the influence of the Laestadian movement, a Finnish Lutheran revival, is particularly strong. In South Ostrobothnia and Swedish-speaking Ostrobothnia, the influence of awakenism and evangelicalism (evankelisuus) is strong, as is that of the Free Church. The Finnish Bible belt has been described on the basis of various indicators, but there is no precise definition. Mika Gissler of the THL has identified the medical districts of the Ostrobothnian regions as the Bible zone, which have distinguished themselves in the long term by a lower number of abortions than the rest of the country. Perho in Central Ostrobothnia is the most Lutheran municipality in Finland. Church membership in Ostrobothnia is also more common than in the rest of the country. Voting of the Christian Democrats in 2019 parliamental elections was most common in Larsmo and Parkano.

=== France ===
Brittany has a long Catholic tradition, and the church has historically played an important role in the region's cultural and social life. Today, the region is known for its many religious festivals and processions, as well as its numerous churches, chapels, and shrines. Another region with a strong Catholic tradition is the Vendée, which is located in western France. The Vendée has a long history of resistance to anti-clericalism and anti-Catholicism, dating back to the French Revolution.

The western suburbs of Paris are also known to be very Catholic, including the city of Versailles.

=== Germany ===
An area in the Ore Mountains in Saxony has been described as the "Saxon Bible Belt" with a notable evangelical Protestant/Christian fundamentalist/free church community, as well as some conservative Lutheran parishes that are opposed to same-sex marriage. Nevertheless, the Evangelical-Lutheran Church of Saxony approved church resolutions regarding the issue regardless of opinions within those parishes.

=== Lithuania ===
Among its Baltic neighbors, Lithuania is in general much more religious with Catholicism having long historical roots in the culture of Lithuanians, but even in this context Vilnius district and Šalčininkai district municipalities, which have a large number of Lithuanian Poles, are the most religious administrative regions of Lithuania. Both the Šalčininkai and Vilnius district municipalities were declared by the ruling Electoral Action of Poles in Lithuania – Christian Families Alliance as being guarded and ruled by Jesus Christ.

=== Mexico ===
In Mexico, there is what is known as the Rosary Belt (Spanish: Cinturón del Rosario). The term, created by journalist and writer Carlos Monsiváis in 1999, refers to a region comprising the states of Aguascalientes, Guanajuato, Jalisco, Querétaro and, in more recent years, Zacatecas, where 90% of the population professes Roman Catholicism, which has a notable influence on local politics and society. Guanajuato, for example, is one of the most important electoral strongholds of the National Action Party, of Christian democrat tradition, mostly inspired by the Social Doctrine of the Church, and with strong conservative ideals. It was in this region where the first uprisings against the government took place during the Cristero War, demanding an end to the persecution of Catholics in the country as a result of the promulgation of the so-called Calles Law, which restricted Catholic worship in Mexico.

=== Netherlands ===
The Bible Belt of the Netherlands (Dutch: Bijbelgordel) stretches from Zeeland, through the West-Betuwe and Veluwe, to the northern parts of the province Overijssel. In this region, orthodox Calvinists prevail.

The ABC Islands of Aruba, Bonaire, and Curaçao are all under 20% irreligious.

=== New Zealand ===
In New Zealand, Mount Roskill, Auckland, contains the highest number of churches per capita in the country, and is the home of several Christian political candidates. The electorate was one of the last in the country to go "wet", in 1999, having formerly been a dry area where the selling of alcohol was prohibited.

In the 2013 New Zealand census, the Māngere-Ōtāhuhu Local Board area of Auckland had the highest concentration of Christians in New Zealand, with 67.7 percent of the local board's 71,000 residents identifying as such. This is due to its high proportion of Pacifica immigrants.

In contrast to other Bible belts, both areas tend to vote for left-wing candidates and are both currently represented in parliament by the center-left Labour Party as of 2023.

=== Norway ===
The Bible Belt of Norway is located mainly in the western and southern parts of the country, especially rural areas of Agder and Rogaland counties, which contains numerous devout Lutherans.

=== Poland ===
The southern and eastern parts of Poland are much more religious than in the north and west. See Poland A and B.

=== Soviet Union ===
Before its independence, Soviet Ukraine was known as the Bible Belt of the Soviet Union, with a significant proportion of Baptists.

=== Sweden ===
The area normally called the Bible Belt of Sweden is centered on Jönköping in southern Sweden and contains numerous free churches. Of the Småland counties, Jönköping is characterized by the Free Church, Kalmar by the High Church, and Kronoberg by the Old Church. In a broader sense, the Bible Belt refers to the area between Jönköping and Gothenburg.

There are also numerous conservative Lutheran Laestadians in the Torne Valley area in the far north of the country.

=== United Kingdom ===
In Northern Ireland, the area in County Antrim stretching from roughly Ballymoney to Larne and centered in the area of Ballymena is often referred to as a Bible Belt. This is because the area is heavily Protestant with a large evangelical community. From 1970 to 2010, the MP for North Antrim was Ian Paisley, a Free Presbyterian minister well known for his theological fundamentalism. The town of Ballymena, the largest town in the constituency, is often referred to as the "buckle" of the Bible Belt.

== See also ==
- Banana Belt
- Blue wall
- Born again
- Christian fundamentalism
- Christian right
- Conservative holiness movement
- Hindi Belt
- Deep South
- Evangelicalism in the United States
- Great Awakening
- Jesusland map
- List of belt regions of the United States
- List of U.S. states by religiosity
- Quran Belt
- Rust Belt
- Southern Baptist Convention
- Unchurched Belt
