= Bill Summerell =

Australian rugby league player (1913-1972)

Personal information
- Full name: William George Summerell
- Born: 22 November 1913 Fairfield, New South Wales, Australia
- Died: 27 June 1972 (aged 58) Hurstville, New South Wales, Australia

Playing information
- Position: Second-row
Club
Years	Team	Pld	T	G	FG	P
1935–38	St. George	16	5	1	0	17
- Source: Whiticker/Hudson

William George Summerell (1913-1972) was an Australian rugby league footballer who played in the 1930s. He later became an administrator for the St. George Dragons.

== Playing career ==
Bill Summerell (nicknamed 'Monka') played 106 games for the St. George Dragons during a long career that included 16 first grade appearances before retiring as a player in 1938. He returned 5 years later to trial for first grade during World War II, but his enlistment for war duties with the RAAF curtailed his comeback aspirations, although he played some reserve grade games in 1942 including a Reserve Grade Semi Final against Wests that was written in the press as the greatest game of his career on 26 August 1942

== Coaching and Administrative career at St. George ==
Summerell later coached Reserve and Third Grades during the 1950s and became Chairman of selectors giving many years of great service to the St. George Dragons notably during the Golden Era (1956-1966).

Bill loved the St. George Dragons and during one evening in 1972 at Kogarah Jubilee Oval, while looking at the panorama of Botany Bay, he declared, "That's the greatest sight I've ever seen" before dying suddenly the next day.

== Death ==
Bill Summerell died on 27 June 1972 at Hurstville, New South Wales and was later cremated at Woronora Cemetery, Sutherland, New South Wales aged 58.
