= Bible Belt (Netherlands) =

Religious sector of the Netherlands

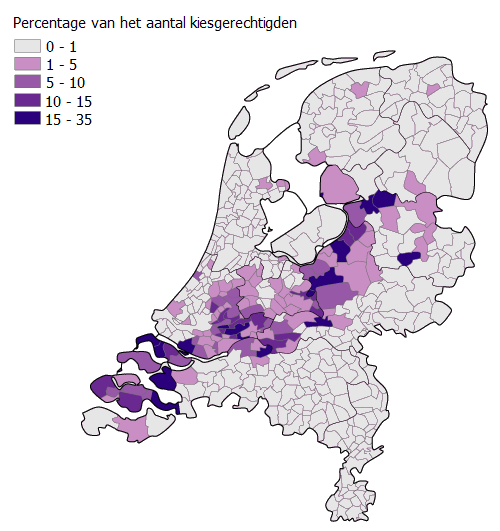
Areas where the Dutch Christian right Reformed Political Party (SGP) received a significant number of votes in 2010, largely co-extensive with the Dutch Bible Belt

The Bible Belt (Dutch: Bijbelgordel, Biblebelt) is a strip of land in the Netherlands with the highest concentration of conservative orthodox Reformed Protestants in the country. Although the term is of recent origin (named by analogy after the Bible Belt of the United States) the Dutch Bible Belt has existed for many generations. Due to the traditions of the local populace, it is also regarded as a cultural area of the Netherlands.

This Bible Belt stretches from Zeeland and Goeree-Overflakkee in the southwest, through the eastern half of South Holland, the West-Betuwe and Veluwe in the center of the country, to parts of the province Overijssel in the northeast. Some exclave communities exist outside the belt with strong conservative Reformed leanings. For example, some municipalities of Friesland, such as Dantumadiel, have characteristics typical of the Bible Belt, as well as Urk, considered by many as one of the most traditional communities in the country.

== Locations ==
Municipalities in the Bible Belt include Yerseke, Tholen, Ouddorp, Opheusden, Kesteren, Barneveld, Nunspeet, Elspeet, Heerde, Epe, Hattem, Zwartewaterland and Staphorst. The largest village regarded to be part of the Bible Belt is Ede. In Overijssel, the Bible belt is even more dispersed and typically not from one municipality to the next. Pockets exist such as in Rijssen.

The various conservative orthodox Calvinist denominations, such as the Old-Reformed Congregations in the Netherlands, have a combined official membership of about 400,000 people, approximately 2.5% of the entire population, although other sources estimate their share at about 7%.

== History ==
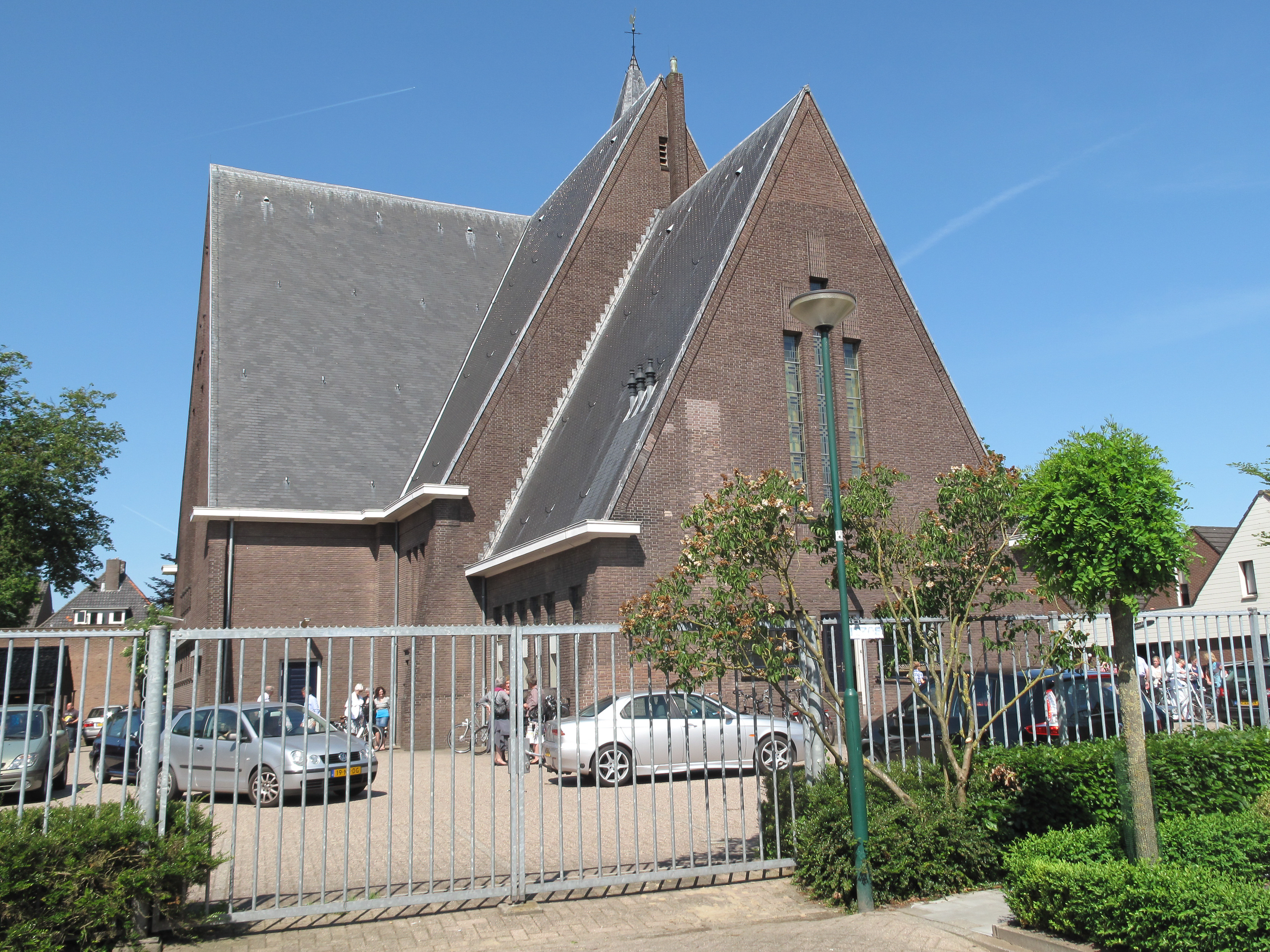
A Protestant Reformed Church in Veenendaal.

When Flanders and North Brabant were reconquered by the Spanish army during the Eighty Years' War, their Protestant inhabitants were required to either convert to Catholicism or leave. Many emigrated north of the border, particularly during the Twelve Years' Truce of 1609–21. Many of them later became staunch supporters of the pietist movement known as the Nadere Reformatie (further reformation). Following the 1832 schism, known as the Afscheiding ("Secession"), and the 1886 Dutch Reformed Church split (Doleantie ("Sorrow")) which was led by Abraham Kuyper, they left the mainstream Dutch Reformed Church and founded their own, more conservative congregations, the most notable of which are the Christian Reformed Churches and the Reformed Congregations ("Gereformeerde Gemeenten"), known colloquially as zwarte-kousenkerken ("black stockings churches").

The Bible Belt differs in many aspects (amongst them a regular Sunday church attendance – often twice on a Sunday) from the traditionally Catholic province of Limburg to the south (where Sunday church attendance averages between 2% and 3% of the population) and western and northern parts of the Netherlands, which are secular.

== Life and tradition ==
The church plays a central role in the life of Bible Belt communities, and they typically oppose the liberal practices of mainstream Dutch society, such as euthanasia, gay rights, abortion, prostitution, and pornography. In some parts, activities like watching television are forbidden. In Staphorst, for instance, swearing is discouraged, many women wear skirts or dresses, and the automated bank machine and other services are closed on Sundays. In Bible Belt communities, a strong religious tone in public life is accompanied by a conservative outlook, a preference for large families (the region has relatively high fertility rates), and an emphasis on traditional values. Statistically, the highest birth rates in the Netherlands and the youngest populations are within this region, and they also have the lowest divorce rates.

An aspect of Bible Belt society that has drawn the attention of the Dutch general public in the 1990s (when concerns of a measles epidemic emerged) is the suspicion of parents towards state-run vaccination programmes.

The Bible Belt provides a base of support for the Reformed Political Party (SGP) and Christian Union (CU).

== See also ==
- Bible Belt (disambiguation)
- Dutch Americans in Michigan, a diaspora community tracing its origins to the Dutch Bible Belt
- Religion in the Netherlands
