= Fenix FCS =

- Full name: Fenix Football Club Sydney
- Nicknames: El Fenix, Albimorados,
- Founded: 2004
- Ground: Knight Park; Yennora, New South Wales
- Capacity: 200
- League: Sydney Amateur Football League
- 2009: 3rd
- Website: http://www.fenixfcs.org/
Home colours	Away colours

Fenix Football Club Sydney, is an Australian association football club located in Fairfield, New South Wales. The club was founded on 15 August 2004, currently a member of the Sydney Amateur Football League under the Football NSW federation. The club is largely supported by members of the Latin American Australian community.

== History ==
Inaugurated on 15 August 2004, by Chilean Luis Gutiérrez, and the Uruguayan Fabian Mateo. The name of the club was adopted in honour to Centro Atlético Fenix, an Uruguayan institution founded in July 1916, the name was adopted and the club baptised as Fenix. The fenix is the emblem and logo of the club.

In 2010, Luis Gutierrez, the only founder who was still participating with the club, decided to leave and presented his resignation to the Public Officer role that he had been in charge since the foundation of the club, for personal reasons.

== Uniform ==
Throughout time the club has owned a series of uniforms, when first established the uniform was a white shirt, with light blue details, and a Flag of Uruguay on the left arm, an upgrade was made the following years and a light blue uniform, similar to the one used by the Uruguay national football team was used.

As time progressed, the Uruguayan identity has expanded to a South American one and the white and purple uniform was introduced to represent a team rather than a nation, and until now the club has kept the same colours, as seasons have gone past the details on the uniform have changed, the first jersey did not have sponsors and the numbers were black, a second set was introduced with minor variations. In 2009 a new design was added and it was first presented to an official match on 17 May 2009, traditionally the club uses a jersey half white and half purple, black shorts and purple socks. The away uniform is a white shirt with yellow and grey details, with black shorts and white socks.

== Honours ==
- Patricia Bobadilla Cup:
  - 2004 Champions
  - 2005 Runners Up
  - 2006 Runners Up
  - 2007 Third Place
  - 2008 Champions
- Cacique Cup:
  - 2007 Fourth Place
  - 2008 Third Place
  - 2009 Runners Up
- Copa Libertadores Sydney:
  - 2009 Third Place
- S.D.S.F.A. League:
  - 2005 Champions
- S.A.F.L League Second Division:
  - 2006 Third Place
  - 2007 Runners Up
  - 2008 Runners Up
- S.A.F.L League:
  - 2009 Third Place
