= Leonid Denysenko =

Ukrainian Australian graphic artist (1926–2020)

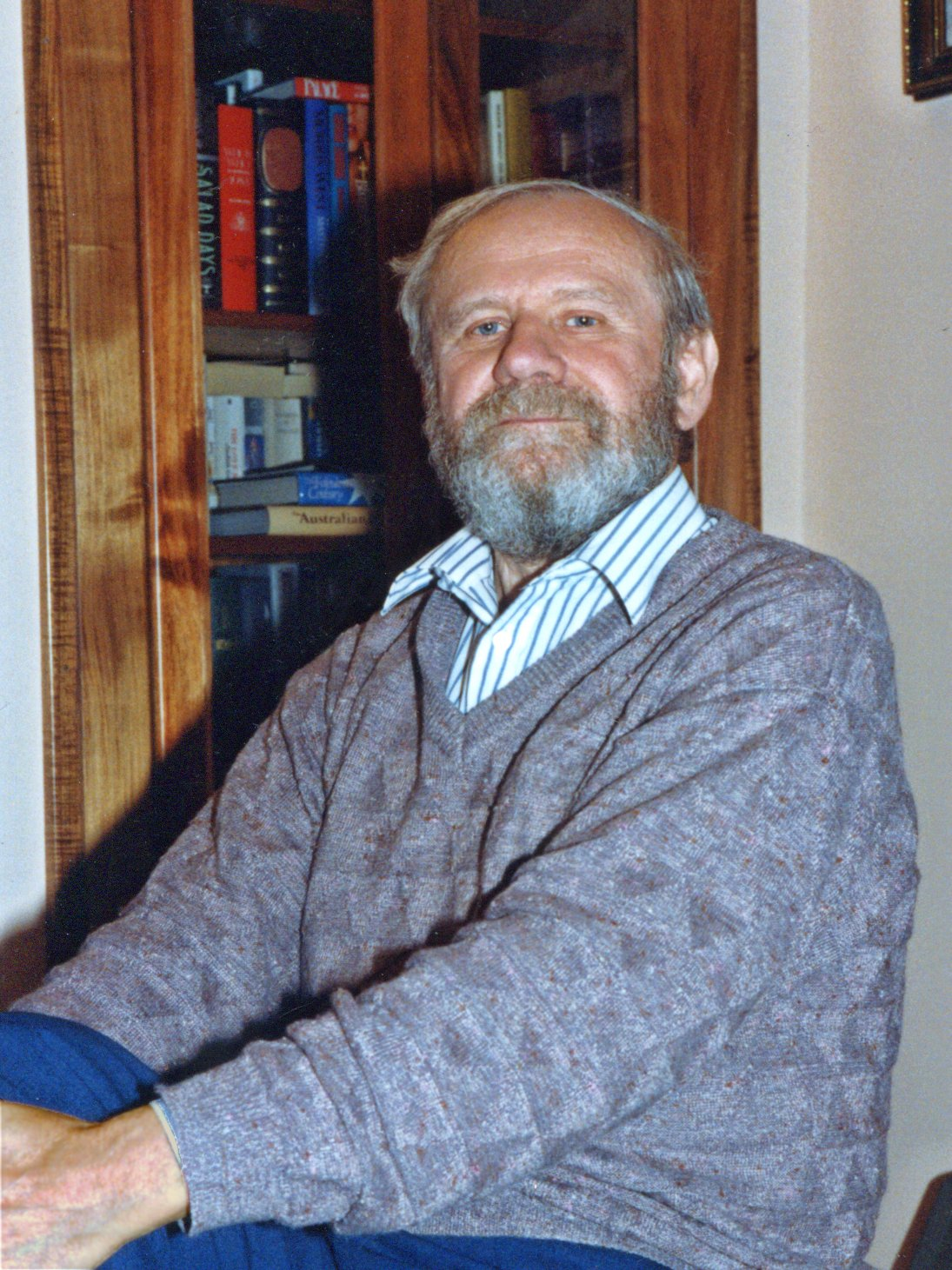
- Denysenko in 2001
- Born: Леонід Дмитрович Денисенко; 25 July 1926; Warsaw, Poland
- Died: 12 May 2020 (aged 93); Canberra, Australia
- Known for: graphic arts, drawing, cartoons, literography
- Notable work: God is Love (literography), International Monument to New Settlers (Fairfield, NSW)

Leonid Denysenko (25 July 1926 – 12 May 2020) was a Ukrainian Australian artist living in Sydney, Australia. He is notable for the introduction of the graphic art technique of "literography". He was a founding member of the Ukrainian Artists Society of Australia.

== Biography and career ==
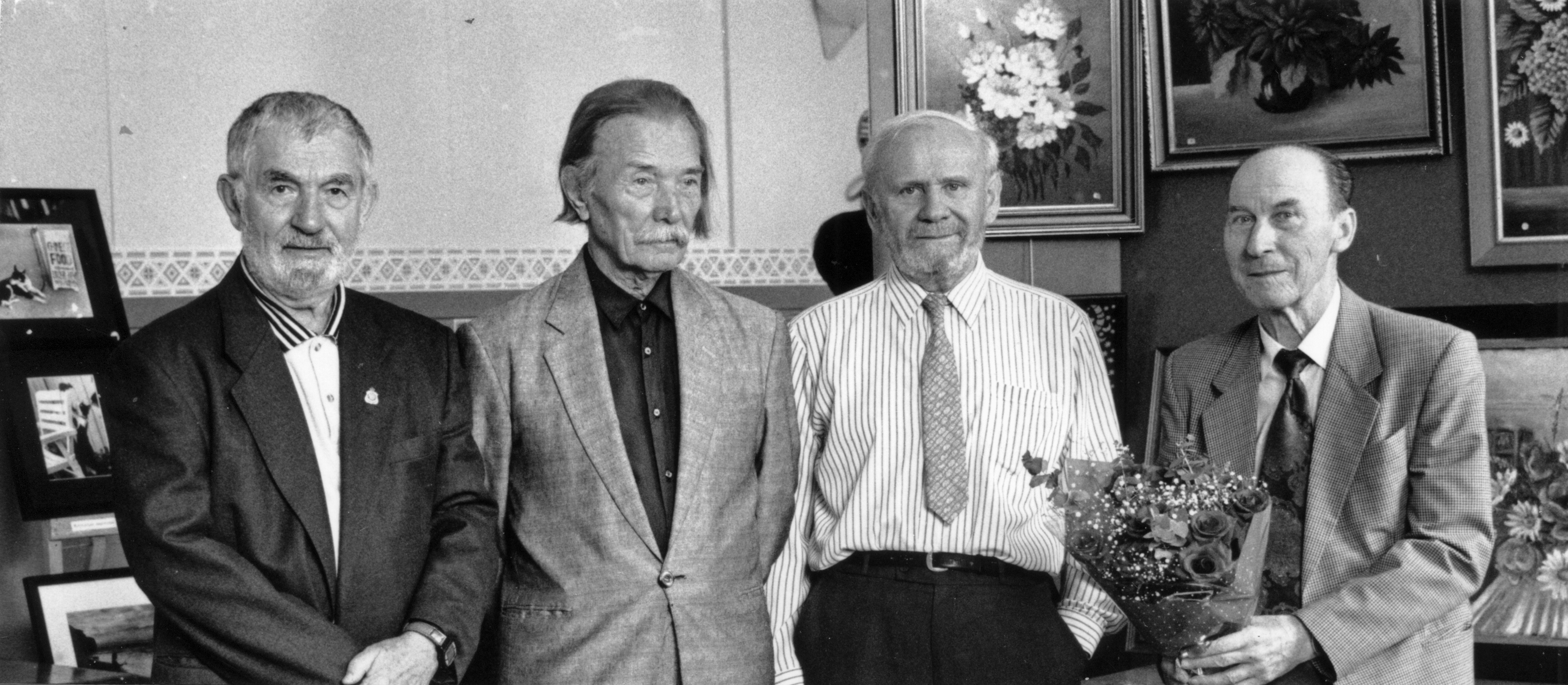
Densysenko (third from left) with Valentin Shkolny, Stepan Chwyla, and Peter Kravchenko (from left to right) at the Ukrainian National Hall in Lidcombe in 1999

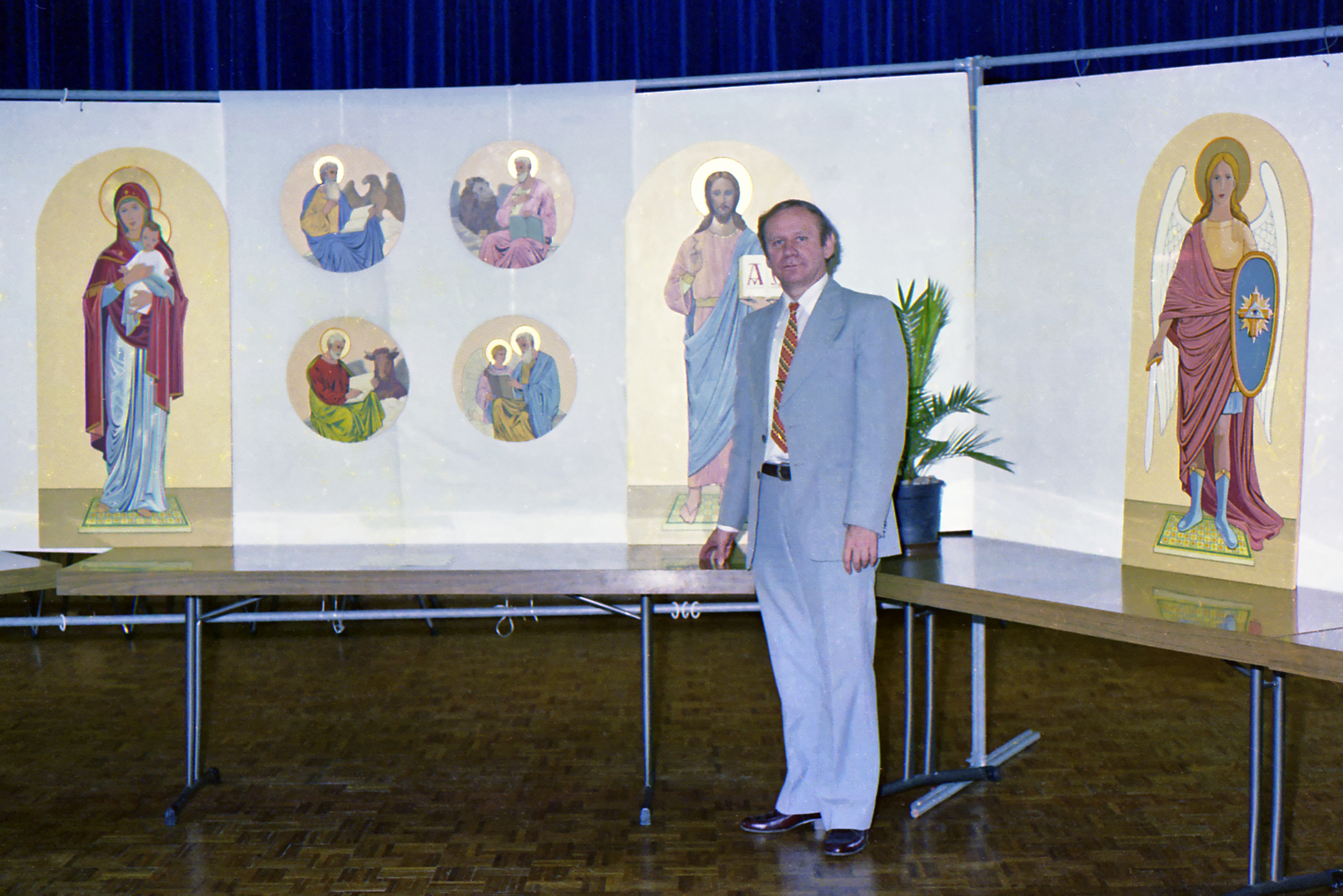
Denysenko with his wall panels before they were mounted on the exterior of the Ukrainian Millenium - Orthodox Centre in Canberra

Born in Warsaw in 1926 of Ukrainian émigré parents, Denysenko studied art in Poland. After World War II he worked as an artist with the United States armed forces in Germany.

After arriving in Australia in 1949 with his family, he was sent to a migrant reception and training camp at Bathurst, NSW. As part of the 'assisted passage' Denysenko and his brother, Yurij were under a contract to the Australian Government to work where the Government sent them: the two were sent to Queensland to be sugar cane cutters. As related by Leonid himself in the Australian Women's Weekly:

"I was distraught. I didn't want to be split up from my parents. Luckily the camp held an arts and crafts exhibition soon after we arrived and I exhibited some of the sketches I had made in Germany and in Italy on my way here. "Then I sketched cartoons of the hierarchy of the camp and of the then General (later Field-Marshal) Sir Thomas Blamey who opened the exhibition. He was very pleased with the drawing and I was bold enough to say I didn't want to be a cane cutter. His reply was that my hands were too good. So I became staff records officer of the camp, which gave me plenty of time to sketch. "

In time, the Denysenkos left the camp and Leonid with his mother and brother, helped stage a number of Ukrainian arts and craft shows in Australia. By 1950 Leonid was already being featured in Australian media as a "migrant artist from Ukraine", and "a young Ukrainian whose pen-and- ink work is much above the ordinary".

Having passed the required exams to teach art in secondary and high schools, Denysenko went on to enjoy a diverse career. He worked as a stage and set designer for theatre and films, a cartoonist and illustrator for books and periodicals, a stamp designer, a ballet company's leading dancer, an art teacher and principal, and a freelance journalist.

Denysenko held a degree in graphic art, a certificate in education and a diploma in fine arts. He died in Canberra on 12 May 2020, at the age of 93.

== Commonwealth Jubilee Exhibition of New Australian Arts and Crafts ==
In 1951 Denysenko was chosen to be in charge of the New Australian Arts and Crafts Exhibition, which was part of the celebrations for the Jubilee of Australia's Federation. Denysenko's pen-and-ink sketches of Australian towns visited during the exhibition's tour were also part of the show. This touring exhibition visited capital cities and towns in all the states of Australia, including Queensland and Tasmania.

== Works ==
Denysenko pioneered a new graphic art technique called "literography", which uses letters from words to form detailed pictures. His most famous work is the icon "God is Love", which features an image of Jesus Christ using letters of the word Love written in 79 different languages.

In December 1955, the Australian Department of Immigration announced a public competition to obtain designs for a suitable stamp about migration. Designs also were sought from a further 10 artists and designers, including Denysenko. About 300 entries were received.

Despite the great response to the competition and much discussion, a stamp on the theme of migration was never issued. Instead, the Department of Immigration used many of the entries in its touring immigration and citizenship promotional displays. In 1989 the two entries by Denysenko were featured in an exhibition of these "forgotten works" at the Powerhouse Museum in Sydney.

Together with his brother Jurij, an architect, Denysenko won a competition for the design of the International Monument in Fairfield in Western Sydney, that celebrates migration and the multi-ethnic community in that local government area.

Denysenko's designed the mosaics adorning the church at the Ukrainian Orthodox Centre in Canberra.

== Exhibitions ==
Denysenko exhibited in group exhibitions of the Ukrainian Artists Society of Australia in both Australia, and Ukraine, and his work "God is Love" has featured in many exhibitions throughout Australia.

=== Group exhibitions ===
- 1973 – International Eucharistic Congress – Arts Festival, Exhibition Building, Melbourne, 15–25 February 1973
- 2001 — "Devotion: the Religious, the Domestic and the Pacific", Casula Powerhouse Arts Centre, 12 September – 18 October 2001
- 2010 — "Text as Spiritual Imagery" Exhibition, McGlade Gallery, Strathfield, September – October 2010
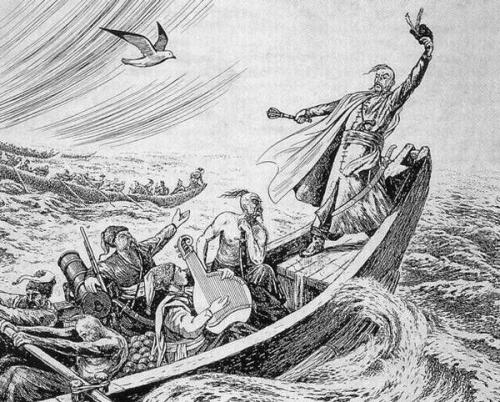
Illustration for a Taras Shevchenko poem

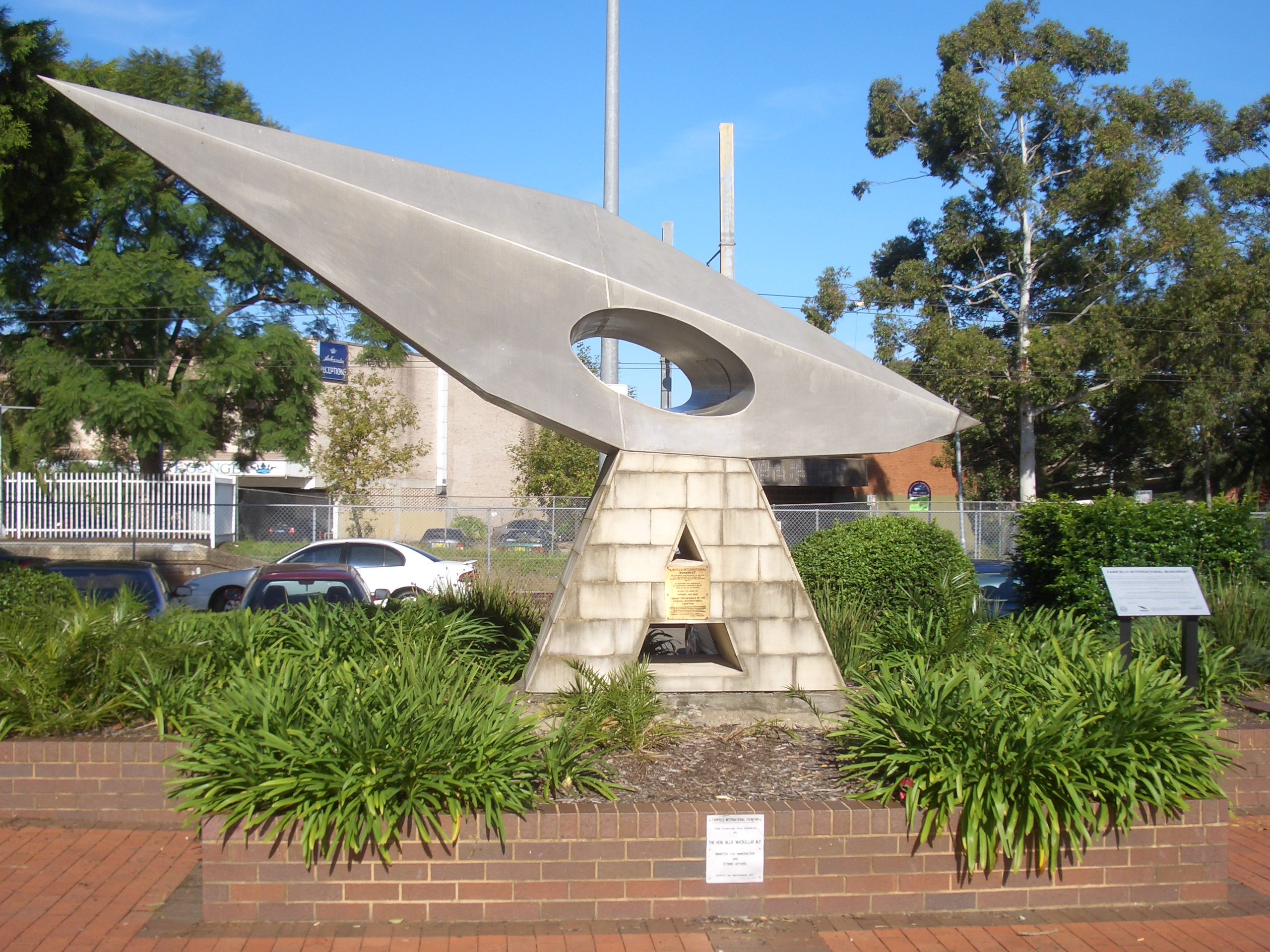
The International Monument celebrating the multi-ethnic community of Fairfield in Western Sydney. Design by Leonid and Jurij Denysenko.

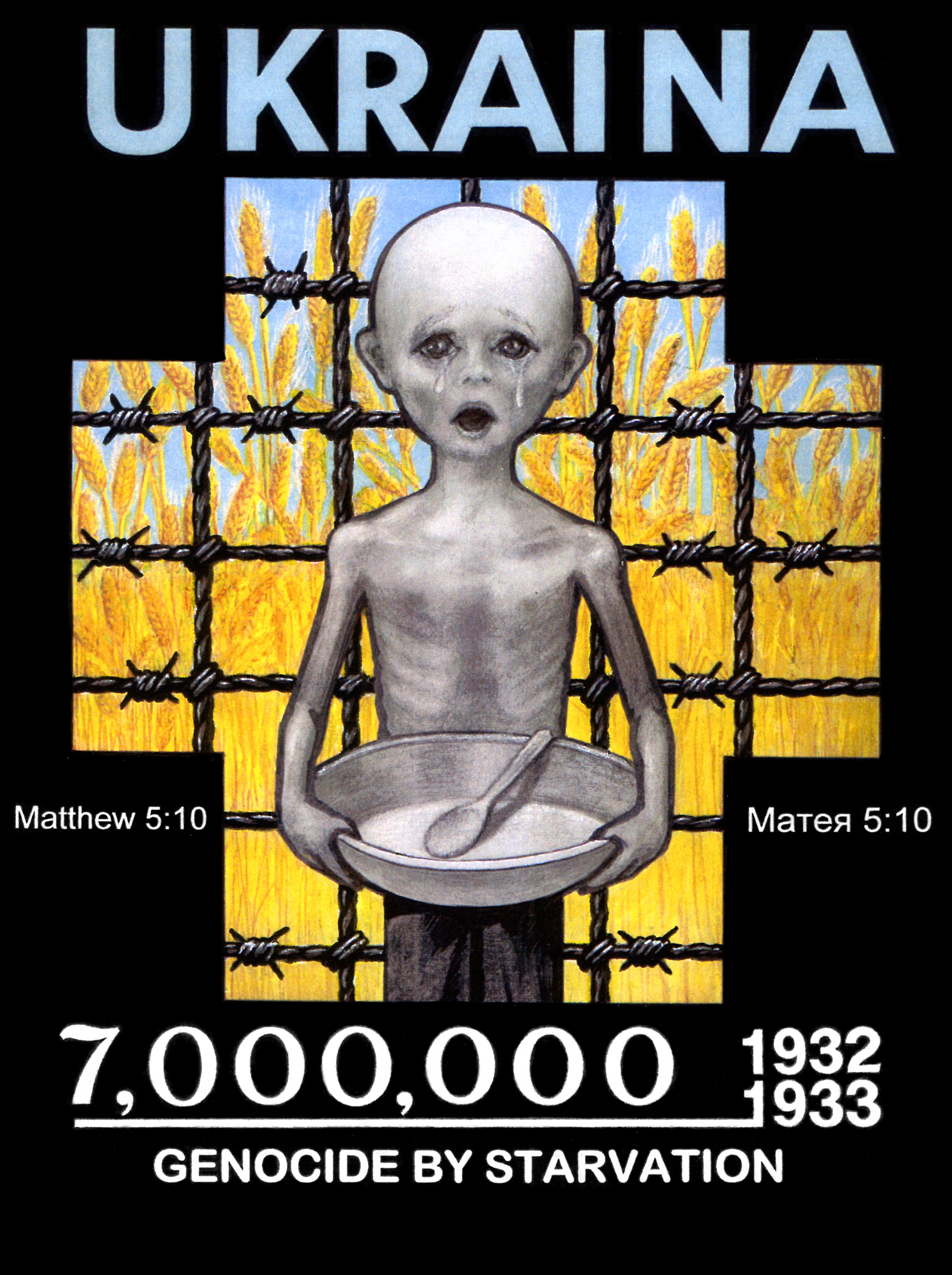
A Holodomor poster by Leonid Denysenko, 2009.
