= Fairfield, New South Wales =

Fairfield
- Suburb
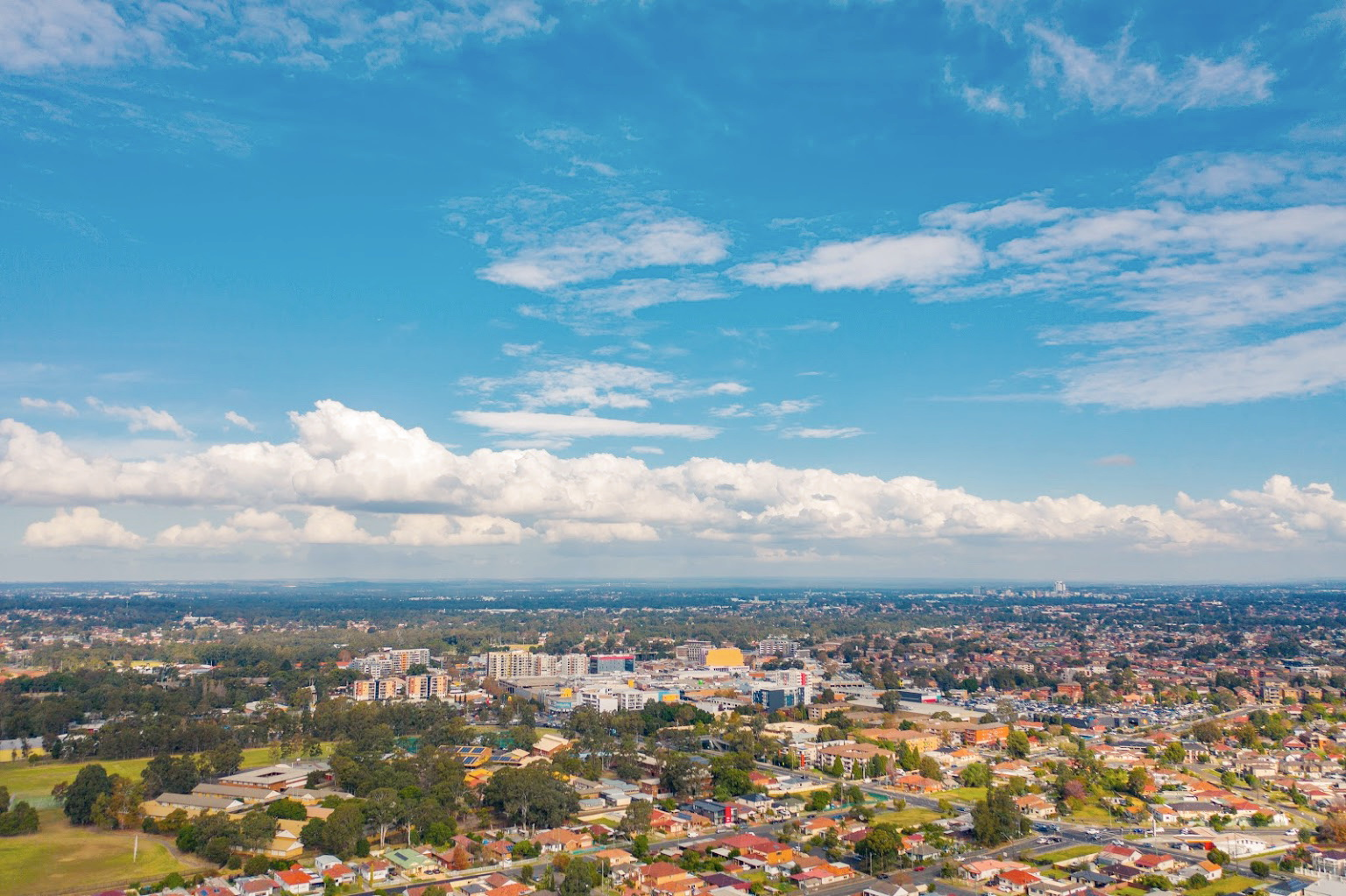
- A bird's eye view of Fairfield

- Interactive map of Fairfield
- Country: Australia
- State: New South Wales
- City: Sydney
- LGAs: City of Fairfield; Cumberland Council
- Location: 30 km (19 mi) west of Sydney CBD
- Established: 1807

Government
  - State electorate: Fairfield
  - Federal divisions: Fowler; McMahon

Area
  - Total: 4.4 km^{2} (1.7 sq mi)
- Elevation: 15 m (49 ft)

Population
  - Total: 18,596 (2021 census)
  - Density: 4,230/km^{2} (10,950/sq mi)
- Postcode: 2165
Suburbs around Fairfield
Smithfield	Yennora	Old Guildford
Fairfield Heights	Fairfield	Fairfield East
Canley Heights	Canley Vale	Carramar

Fairfield is a suburb of Western Sydney, in the state of New South Wales, Australia. Being in the centre of the Cumberland Plain, Fairfield is located 30 kilometres (19 mi) west of the Sydney central business district and is the administrative heart of the Fairfield City Council (local government area) – despite a very small portion of it belonging to the Cumberland Council. Fairfield supports a mixture of commercial and residential developments, mostly characterised by medium-density buildings and some new high-rise apartments.

Fairfield is one of the most multicultural and culturally diverse cities in Australia, with more than half of the residents having been born overseas, mostly in non-English speaking countries. The majority of the suburb's dwellers speak a language other than English at home, with the two most common ones being Arabic and Assyrian Neo-Aramaic. Fairfield is an ethnic enclave of Assyrian Christians (mostly from Iraq, and more recently Syria), along with newer Sunni Iraqi arrivals.

== History ==
=== European settlement, 1780s–1810s ===
Prior to European settlement, Aboriginal people from the Cabrogal-Gandangara tribe have lived in the Fairfield area for more than 30,000 years. The earliest recorded white settlement in the Fairfield district is described in William Bradley's Journal where he noted an expedition from Rose Hill to Prospect Creek to determine whether Prospect Creek led to Botany Bay. Bradley described a place on the Creek where the water changed from fresh to salt with a drop of 4 feet (1.2 m). The presence of salt water confirmed Prospect Creek's connection to the sea.

Gabriel Louis Marie Huon de Kerrileau, a Breton soldier in the NSW Corps arrived in the colony in 1794, having fled France during the French Revolution. In 1807 he received a grant of 100 acres (40 ha) in the centre of Fairfield, which he named Castel Paul. This was an Englished form of the town in which he was born in Brittany, Kastell-Paol, Saint-Pol-de-Léon in French. By 1814 Castel Paul had been combined, by subsequent owners, with several similarly sized grants to form a largely uncleared 700 acres (280 ha) estate.

=== Early development, 1820s–1920s ===
The free settler John Horsley purchased the estate in that year and named it Mark Lodge, after family properties in Essex, England. Horsley, a Magistrate and Coroner at Liverpool (1825-1834), and his large family were among the pioneers of white settlement in the Fairfield District. Later, a Colonial Treasurer, Thomas Ware Smart (1810–1881) bought the estate and in the 1860s built the mansion, 'Fairfield House'.

Fairfield railway station was opened in 1856 and has the oldest surviving railway building in New South Wales. Development began in the mid 19th century supported by railway construction in 1856. The railway aided with the enlargement of local industries including timber, fruit development and agricultural produce. Local directories published in 1919 indicate that most Fairfield residents were employed as farmers, fruit growers, poultry farmers or orchardists. Around the start of the 20th century the area had a population of 2,500 people and with fertile soils, produced crops for distribution in Sydney. Electricity was connected in 1921. John James Woods, born in 1876 in County Tyrone, Ireland, arrived in Fairfield in 1895 and went on to establish JJ Woods and Sons Carriers Pty Ltd in the early 20th century. Starting with horse-drawn carts, the business grew into a major transport company. By the time of Woods's death, it operated around 40 trucks and played a key role in Fairfield's transformation from a rural town into a thriving urban centre.

=== Post-war period, 1940s–1980s ===
Rapid population increase after World War II saw the settlement of many ex-service men and European migrants, with Ware Street becoming the new main street, which featured the city's only escalator. The street at that time featured prominent hardware, furniture, menswear and homeware stores, including a Bing Lee. Large scale Housing Commission development in the 1950s swelled the population to 38,000. By the 1950s, Fairfield town centre had developed into a major regional commercial centre serving the surrounding suburbs, with The Crescent forming its principal retail and business precinct. The opening of the Crescent Theatre in 1934 stimulated the growth of additional cinemas across the district, and by the 1950s it had become a popular entertainment venue. Renamed Hoyts Crescent in 1944, the theatre closed in 1967. Its auditorium was demolished in 2016, although the original façade was retained. The Civic Centre was established in the 1960s in Spencer Street and featured many businesses, including the nearby Civic Hotel. Fairfield Hospital was opened in September 1956 on The Horsley Drive in Carramar, but was relocated to Prairiewood in 1988 with the old site converted into a Karitane infant, Early childhood family education and perinatal mental health centre.

By 1979, the population had reached 120,000 and the city was becoming one of the larger Local Government Areas in New South Wales. In the early 1980s, Fairfield Forum was opened and Ware Street was shut for traffic, with a pedestrian zone established in its stead with a water fountain imported from Italy being the ornament of the civic area. However, the pedestrian plaza was deemed unsuccessful, despite the annual street parades occurring there, and thus Ware Street once again was open to traffic.

=== Rapid growth, 1980s–present ===
During the mid to late 1980s Iran–Iraq War, large number of Assyrians fled Iraq and settled in Fairfield, making it the most popular settlement for Assyrians. In 1990, Neeta City was opened due to the rapid growth of Fairfield's commercial centre. An amphitheatre situated in Spencer Street with chess board was closed in the early 2000s with the street reopening to traffic. In the mid-2000s, Fairfield's first high rise apartment building (around 9 to 11 storeys) was constructed, with a number of other high rise buildings which were built consequentially throughout the city centre.

In 2015, the Abbott government granted 12,000 extra humanitarian visas to persecuted groups in the war-torn Middle Eastern countries, namely Syria. The Department of Social Services confirmed that 11,400 Iraqi and Syrian refugees (many of whom being Assyrian) were admitted to Australia as part of its one-off humanitarian intake, with half of them primarily settling in Fairfield and also Liverpool. Fairfield City accommodated 3,000 humanitarian arrivals in 2016, taking in 75% of all western Sydney's refugee intake, with Liverpool City Council second at 14%. Fairfield City Centre today features a concoction of retail, commercial and residential developments, including medium density edifices and medium to high-rise shop-top housing developments.

In July 2021, Fairfield was one of the "suburbs of concern" and became a hotspot due to rising COVID-19 cases in the region that resulted in a strict lockdown in the area, transforming the CBD into a ghost town, with heavy police patrol compliance checks. Fines were issued for those who did not comply with the state public health order. Workers from Fairfield were ordered to stay at home by NSW premier Gladys Berejiklian unless they had leave the house for emergency reasons or that they had produced a negative COVID-19 test.

== Geography ==
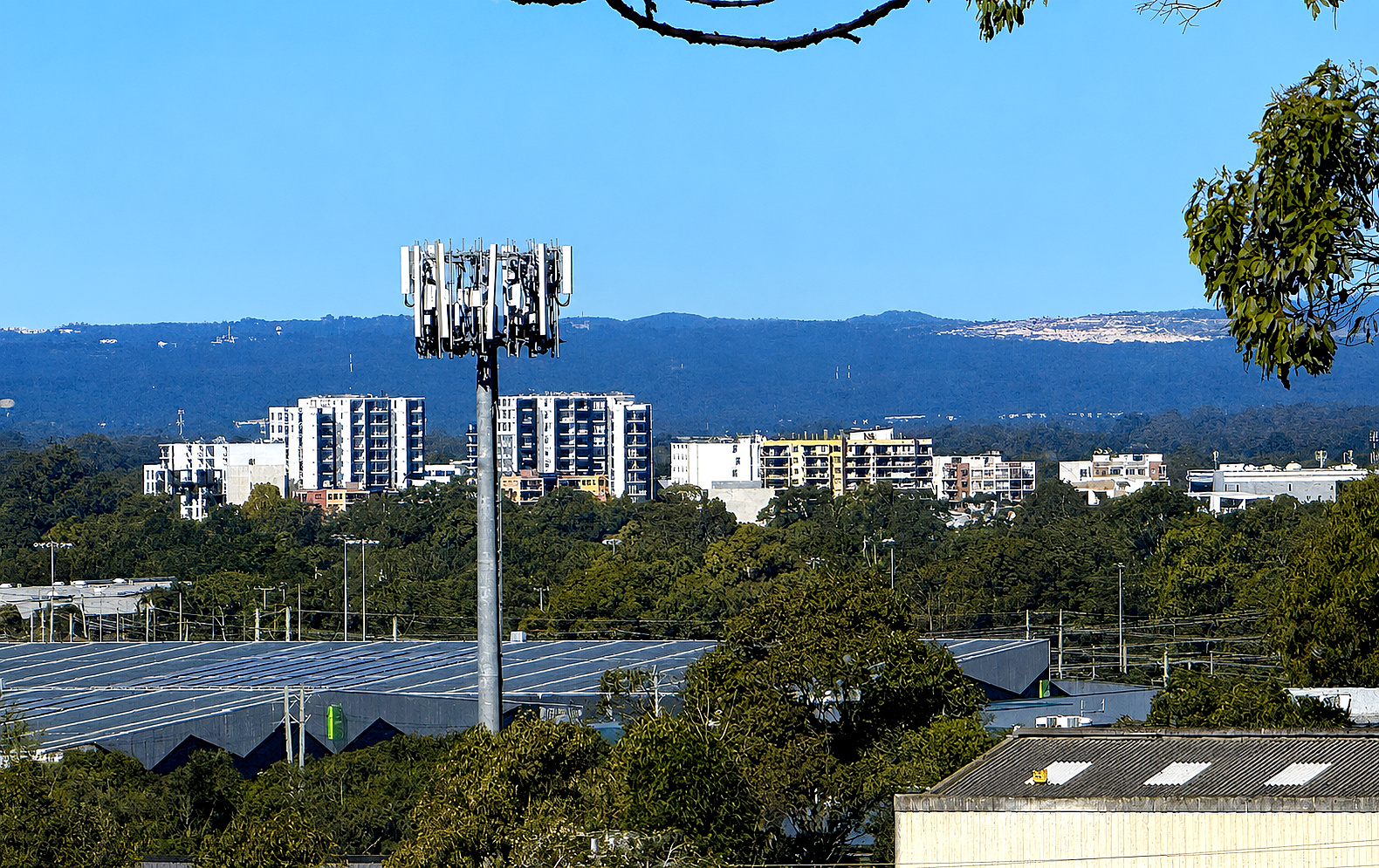
Fairfield CBD skyline and surrounding urban tree canopy, viewed from Greystanes

Much of the original bushland cover within the city has been cleared through past land management practices. A few small areas of this original bushland remain, including examples of Cumberland Plain vegetation and Cooks River/Castlereagh Ironbark Forest, which are listed under the Threatened Species Conservation Act. The Australian white ibis are specifically present in The Crescent, opposite of the train station. Although the suburb is in the Fairfield LGA area, only one very small part of it falls in the Cumberland City Council area; Bell Crescent, which is a dead-end street just east of Prospect Creek. The Horsley Drive has the greatest street-tree canopy cover in Fairfield, at approximately 6,292 m², followed by Sackville Street (4,800 m²), Railway Parade (4,615 m²) and Hamilton Road (4,161 m²).

Eight creeks, 80 kilometres in length, have their headwaters in Fairfield City and flow into the Georges River and Hawkesbury Nepean catchments. The impact of development over the past 50 years has resulted in severe degradation of the natural habitat in the creek banks and water quality has been assessed as very poor in recent years. Strategies are being implemented so that this trend is being reversed. De Freitas Wetland is a natural wetland located near Prospect Creek at Vine Street. Air quality in the city is heavily impacted upon by an insufficiently integrated public transport system, creating an over reliance upon private vehicles for moving people and freight. Fairfield CBD lies on Cenozoic alluvial terrace and floodplain deposits (particularly the areas near Prospect Creek), with the surrounding elevated areas being on older, Middle Triassic Bringelly Shale. The suburb gives its name to the Fairfield Basin, a broad synclinal geological structure within the Sydney Basin. The Fairfield Basin forms one of the major structural sub-basins beneath the Cumberland Plain and preserves substantial thicknesses of the Wianamatta Group.

=== Climate ===
Fairfield has a humid subtropical climate (Köppen climate classification: Cfa). Summer weather may come from north-east (humid) or the north west (dry). Fairfield is usually a few degrees warmer than Sydney on summer days and a few degrees cooler on winter nights. There could be a temperature differential of 5 degrees Celsius in summer due to sea breezes in the City that don't generally penetrate inland, and in extreme cases there could be a 10 degrees differential. It receives less annual rain than Sydney CBD by about 400mm. Late winter and early spring receive the least rainfall, whilst late summer and autumn receive more rain.

Climate data for Prospect Reservoir^{[note a]}
Month	Jan	Feb	Mar	Apr	May	Jun	Jul	Aug	Sep	Oct	Nov	Dec	Year
Record high °C (°F)	47.0 (116.6)	46.4 (115.5)	39.5 (103.1)	37.1 (98.8)	29.4 (84.9)	25.6 (78.1)	26.5 (79.7)	29.4 (84.9)	35.0 (95.0)	39.0 (102.2)	42.0 (107.6)	44.4 (111.9)	47.0 (116.6)
Mean daily maximum °C (°F)	29.3 (84.7)	28.6 (83.5)	26.8 (80.2)	24.1 (75.4)	20.7 (69.3)	17.7 (63.9)	17.2 (63.0)	19.3 (66.7)	22.4 (72.3)	24.8 (76.6)	26.1 (79.0)	28.0 (82.4)	23.8 (74.8)
Mean daily minimum °C (°F)	18.0 (64.4)	18.0 (64.4)	16.2 (61.2)	12.9 (55.2)	9.7 (49.5)	6.1 (43.0)	6.6 (43.9)	6.6 (43.9)	9.5 (49.1)	12.1 (53.8)	14.5 (58.1)	16.4 (61.5)	12.3 (54.1)
Record low °C (°F)	10.0 (50.0)	10.8 (51.4)	7.9 (46.2)	3.6 (38.5)	1.2 (34.2)	−0.8 (30.6)	−0.6 (30.9)	−0.5 (31.1)	1.7 (35.1)	4.5 (40.1)	6.8 (44.2)	7.8 (46.0)	−0.8 (30.6)
Average precipitation mm (inches)	96.4 (3.80)	126.9 (5.00)	97.4 (3.83)	67.4 (2.65)	49.5 (1.95)	76.1 (3.00)	40.7 (1.60)	39.7 (1.56)	42.2 (1.66)	55.3 (2.18)	77.1 (3.04)	75.5 (2.97)	845.0 (33.27)
Average precipitation days (≥ 1mm)	8.3	8.7	9.2	6.5	5.3	7.0	5.6	4.2	5.1	6.6	8.2	8.2	82.9
Average afternoon relative humidity (%)	52	54	55	50	57	54	52	43	45	44	51	51	51
Source 1: Prospect Reservoir (1991–2020 averages)
Source 2: Prospect Reservoir (1965–2018 extremes) Horsley Park (1997–present extremes)

Climate data for Bankstown Airport
Month	Jan	Feb	Mar	Apr	May	Jun	Jul	Aug	Sep	Oct	Nov	Dec	Year
Record high °C (°F)	44.8 (112.6)	43.3 (109.9)	41.6 (106.9)	36.9 (98.4)	28.5 (83.3)	25.4 (77.7)	26.7 (80.1)	30.2 (86.4)	35.6 (96.1)	39.7 (103.5)	43.1 (109.6)	43.6 (110.5)	44.8 (112.6)
Mean daily maximum °C (°F)	28.2 (82.8)	27.8 (82.0)	26.2 (79.2)	23.7 (74.7)	20.4 (68.7)	17.7 (63.9)	17.2 (63.0)	18.9 (66.0)	21.5 (70.7)	23.7 (74.7)	25.1 (77.2)	27.3 (81.1)	23.1 (73.6)
Mean daily minimum °C (°F)	18.1 (64.6)	18.1 (64.6)	16.2 (61.2)	12.7 (54.9)	9.6 (49.3)	6.6 (43.9)	5.1 (41.2)	6.0 (42.8)	8.7 (47.7)	11.8 (53.2)	14.3 (57.7)	16.6 (61.9)	12.0 (53.6)
Record low °C (°F)	10.4 (50.7)	10.0 (50.0)	7.8 (46.0)	2.4 (36.3)	1.3 (34.3)	−1.9 (28.6)	−4.0 (24.8)	−0.7 (30.7)	0.0 (32.0)	4.4 (39.9)	6.8 (44.2)	6.3 (43.3)	−4.0 (24.8)
Average precipitation mm (inches)	90.3 (3.56)	106.4 (4.19)	97.7 (3.85)	83.2 (3.28)	71.1 (2.80)	73.1 (2.88)	44.6 (1.76)	49.1 (1.93)	44.7 (1.76)	62.1 (2.44)	77.2 (3.04)	67.2 (2.65)	867.0 (34.13)
Average precipitation days	11.1	10.9	11.3	8.8	9.8	9.3	8.0	7.3	7.7	9.5	11.0	9.8	114.5

^[note a]: Fairfield is a large suburb, therefore some areas in it may be proximate to the climate of the top or bottom table

== Commercial area ==
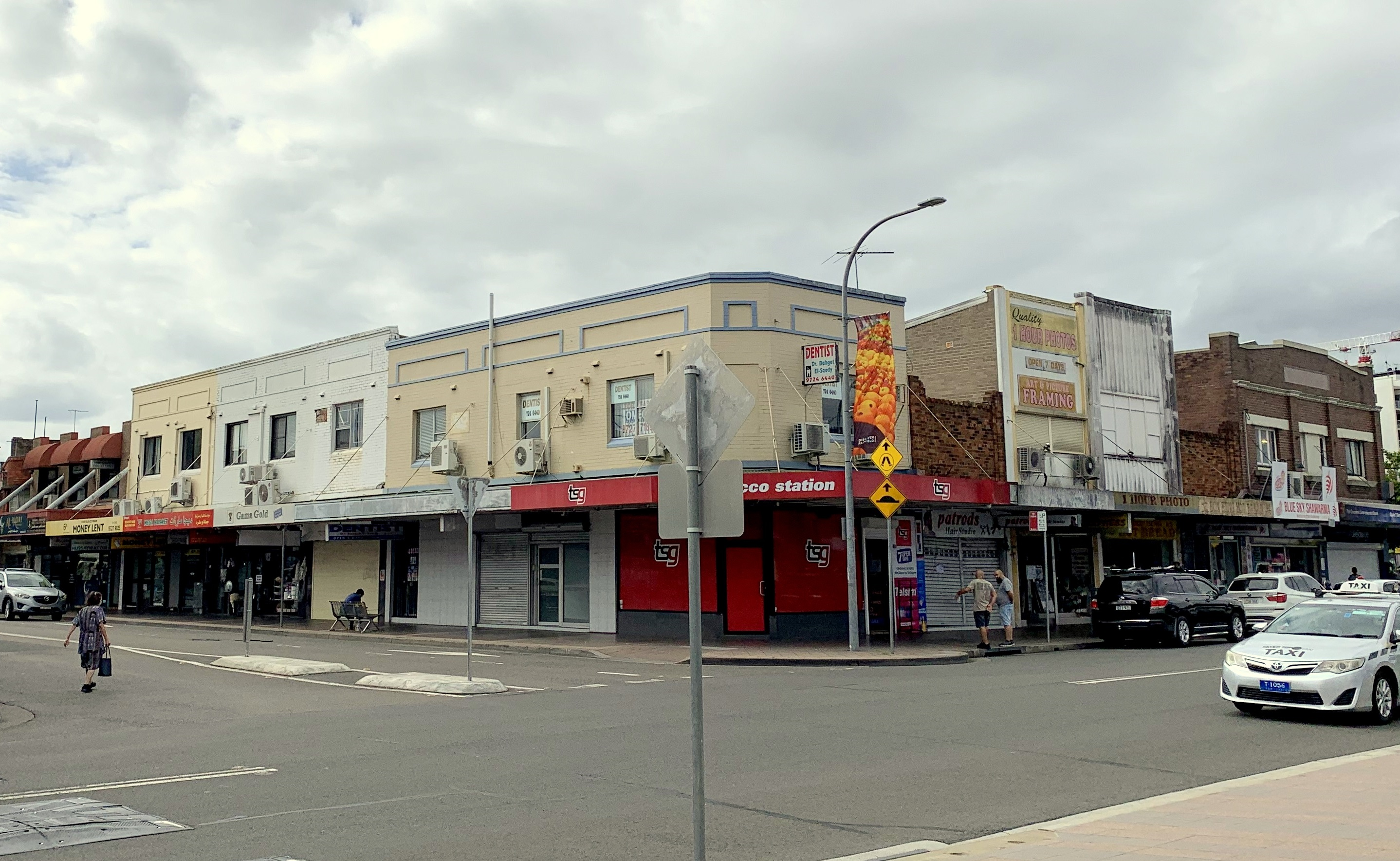
Commercial centre in The Crescent with art deco buildings dating from the 1920s.

Fairfield consists of a combination of main street retail centred in Smart and Ware Streets, arcade and larger shopping centres, with a variety of activities including retail, café/restaurant/take away foods, supermarkets (with some displayed in a bazaar-style environment), personal services and commercial uses. A couple of shop fronts along The Crescent are in the Federation and Art Deco style, which date from the late 1890s to 1920s, respectively, reflecting its former role as an early main street. The CBD is surrounded by a halo of three-storey residential flats, which are beneficial for pedestrian activity to the City Centre. The community holds public gathering and interaction in a high regard, which is manifested by the CBD's active shopping streets and daily social assemblage for playing chess on Kenyon Street.

Fairfield has three shopping malls which were established between the 1980s and early 1990s. The two largest are the Fairfield Forum, Fairfield City Central which was renamed from Neeta City in 2021 and the smaller Fairfield Chase, which underwent a major redevelopment in 2025. Forum contains Kmart, Aldi and Coles. Fairfield City Central features a Woolworths supermarket (previously it featured a Big W). The Fairfield Chase Commercial Tower was Fairfield's first high-rise structure. It has a lower level of commercial shops, a medical centre and food outlets open to the public while the higher levels function as private office building spaces are occupied by government agencies such as Legal Aid NSW, the NSW Service for Treatment and Rehabilitation of Torture and Trauma Survivors and private companies such as a child care centre and employment agencies. The Crescent, Nelson, Ware and Nelson Streets are ornamented by a number of London planes. Fairfield's culturally diverse population is reflected in multicultural local businesses such as over twenty different types of cafés and restaurants that include Assyrian, Iraqi, Italian, Chinese, Lebanese, Vietnamese, South American and Thai cuisine.

== Culture ==
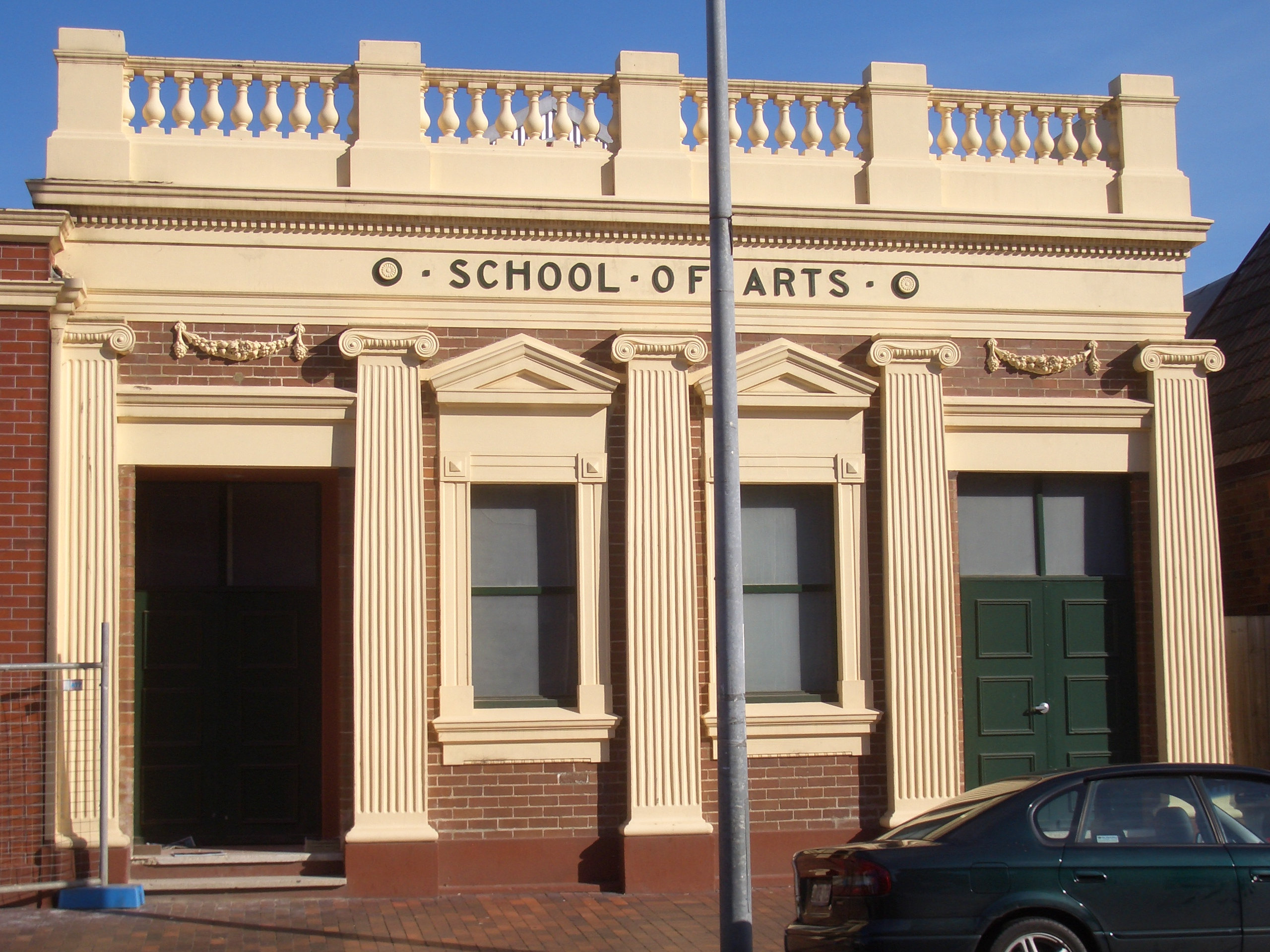
School of Arts

Fairfield School of Arts is significant for its historical, social and aesthetic values. Constructed at the turn of the 20th century, it has long served as a major community and social venue while contributing prominently to the local streetscape as a landmark building. Architecturally, it is a notable example of the transition between the Late Victorian and Federation styles, which are relatively uncommon within the City of Fairfield. In Fairfield, the School of Arts became an important venue for public meetings, performances and community events, reflecting the township's cultural and civic development during its early growth. A cinema at Fairfield Forum was opened as 'Hoyts Forum Twin' on 17 March 1983 with around 400 seating. In 1992, the complex was renamed Fairfield Cinema, with a third screen installed in 1996. In 2006, it was reestablished as the World Cinemas (primarily exhibiting Bollywood films). The cinema was altogether closed in 2010 and its site became a fitness/gym centre.

There is a 1,000 sqm public library in Hamilton Road, which was previously located in Kenyon Street. Fairfield has a few Assyrian churches, sporting clubs, cultural associations and health groups. Sydney's Iraqi community congregated in Fairfield to celebrate Iraq qualifying for the Asian Football Cup finals in 2007. More than 7000 people joined in street celebrations around Fairfield on Sunday 29 July 2007 after Iraq won the Asian Cup finals. Similar events took place in January 2023 when Iraq won the 25th Arabian Gulf Cup by defeating Oman in the final. Although most of the aforementioned commercial precincts are not a leading part of Fairfield's night time attribute at present, wedding receptions, however, do prevail night activity on the weekends. Major wedding and party venues in the area include Crystal Room Paradiso, Monamor Reception, Imperial Paradiso and Paradiso Reception Centre. In the 1990s and 2000s, El Roche Reception Centre was a popular wedding venue and a Middle Eastern restaurant in Smart Street, before it was shut down in August 2009, and superseded by Crystal Room Paradiso in 2010. 'Fairfield' has been synonymised with 'Assyrian', as people overseas have been familiar with its Assyrian culture. Iraqi and Assyrian businesses have opened in Fairfield, mostly around Ware Street. These businesses include everything from jewellery shops to restaurants, making the area favourite entertainment and shopping hotspot for the Iraqi and Assyrian community. Ware Street and Kenyon Street have been nicknamed "Little Iraq" or "Little Assyria", reflecting the area's Assyrian community. Elderly Assyrian men can often be seen playing dominoes at outdoor tables featuring chessboard patterns.

=== Media ===
Fairfield was served by two local newspapers, the Fairfield Advance and the Fairfield Champion, both of which were published weekly on Wednesdays. The Fairfield Champion ceased publication in September 2022 after Australian Community Media (ACM) discontinued several Western Sydney titles because of rising production and printing costs, while the Fairfield Advance has largely transitioned from regular print editions to digital and online local news coverage. Fairfield Local News is an online, independent local news source for those who reside in the Fairfield area. 2GLF is a community radio station that caters to the communities of Liverpool and Fairfield LGAs.

Fairfield City Council supports digital content creation through facilities including Fairfield HQ on Barbara Street, which is a professional photography and videography studio designed for digital content creation. It provides access to media studios, podcasting and audio production suites, green screen technology, graphic design, video production, music production, virtual reality, robotics and other digital learning resources to foster creative skills and digital literacy within the community.

=== Heritage ===
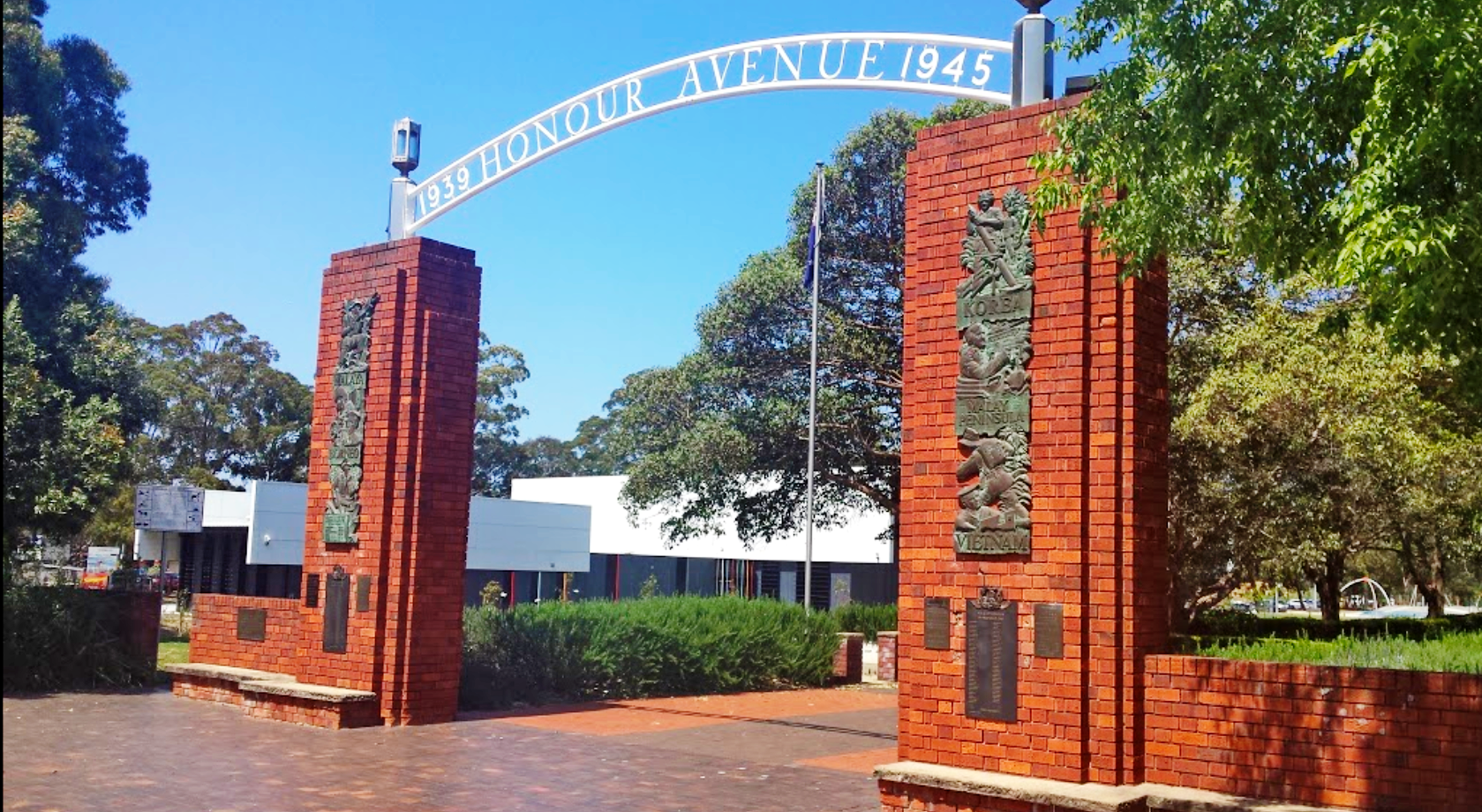
Honour Avenue, situated at the entrance of Fairfield Park Precinct, commemorates Australia's involvement in various 20th century wars.

The School of Arts Building, established in the late 19th century, is a social and historical significance and is an example of Victorian and Federation period styles which are uncommon in the suburb. The Uniting Church is made up of two churches – One of which was built in 1894 and the other in 1927. The first fire brigade built in the city, the Fire Station in William Street, is a free classical style building and is also a historical significance. A federation weatherboard cottage located in Lawson Street was established in around 1910.

Made up of two red brick entrance pillars, Honour Avenue was built in honour of the Fairfield residents who served in the World Wars and it includes the names of World War II personnel. Its connecting metal arch exhibits the words: '1939 Honour Avenue 1945'. The avenue therein contains large brush boxes on both sides and public seating. The heritage-listed site Fairfield railway station is the oldest Railway Station in New South Wales. The commercial centre, particularly in The Crescent, has one of the oldest groups of buildings in Fairfield City, which are Mid-Victorian, Georgian Style public buildings dating back to 1856.

The International Monument in The Crescent Park was built as a symbol of Fairfield's migrant population in 1968. It was designed by Leonid Denysenko and Yurij Denysenko. The letter "A" represents Australia and also Mount Ararat. Originally, the monument had water gushing from the middle in the form of a waterfall. The angular object above symbolises a boat or a plane, while the hole in the middle symbolises the opening where migrants exit to colonise the new land. The nearby LJ Clock Tower was erected in 1958.

== Infrastructure ==
=== Sports and recreation ===
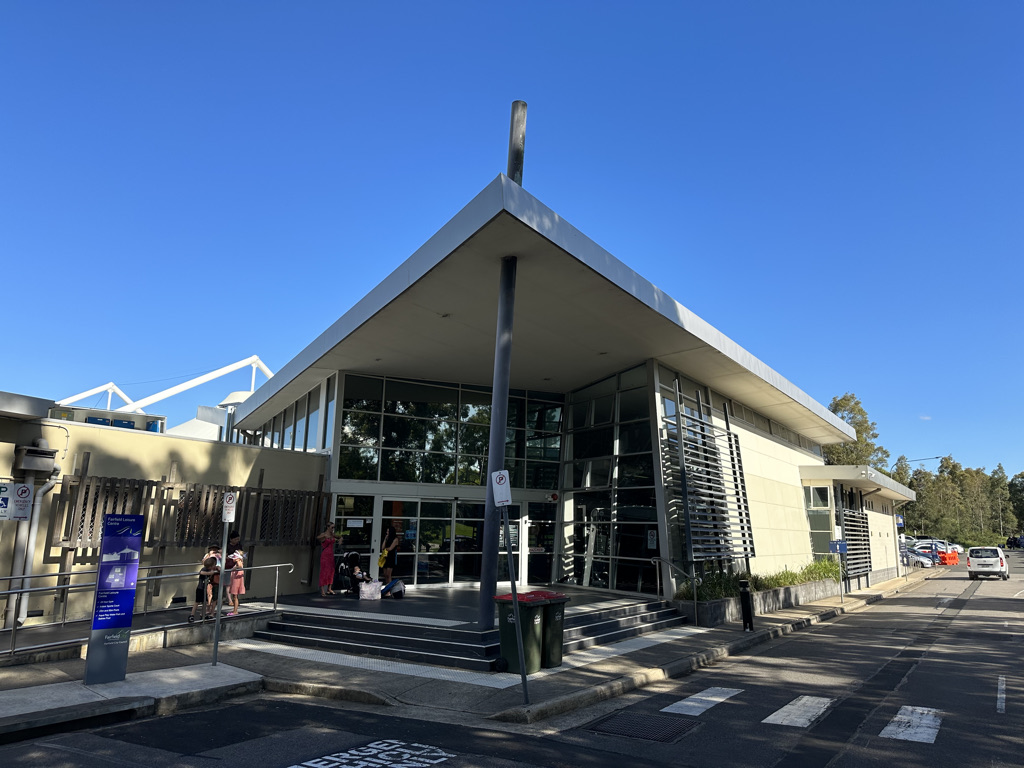
Fairfield Leisure Centre

Fairfield Adventure Park, a large playground for older children and teens, was opened in April 2015. Nearby is the Fairfield Youth and Community Centre and the Fairfield Leisure Centre, an aquatic centre. These facilities are all situated in Fairfield Park Precinct, a large urban park and sports ground. Prospect Creek winds through it. Several small parks meander Prospect Creek as it heads northwest, and they include Cawarra Park, Fairfield Road Park, Bernadette Park, Crosby Reserve and Arbela Park, all featuring walking tracks alongside the creek. The Crescent Park is adjacent to the station, which features public seating surrounded by native and exotic plants. Babylon Reserve on North Street is a passive bushland reserve comprising remnant eucalypt woodland, native understorey vegetation and a small open grassed area, remaining largely undeveloped as a natural reserve.

Avenel Park is undergoing redevelopment as part of the NSW Government's Western Sydney Infrastructure Grants Program. The project will transform the park into an inclusive recreation precinct featuring a skate park, multi-sports court, obstacle course, inclusive fitness area with a 25-metre sprint track, walking circuit, turf mound with seating, picnic shelters, cooling stations, landscaping and tree planting. The project is funded with $4,211,419 from the NSW Government and a $60,159 contribution from Fairfield City Council, for a total project value of $4,271,578.

Fairfield is the home suburb of the Fairfield Bulls and Fenix FCS football clubs.

=== Urban design ===
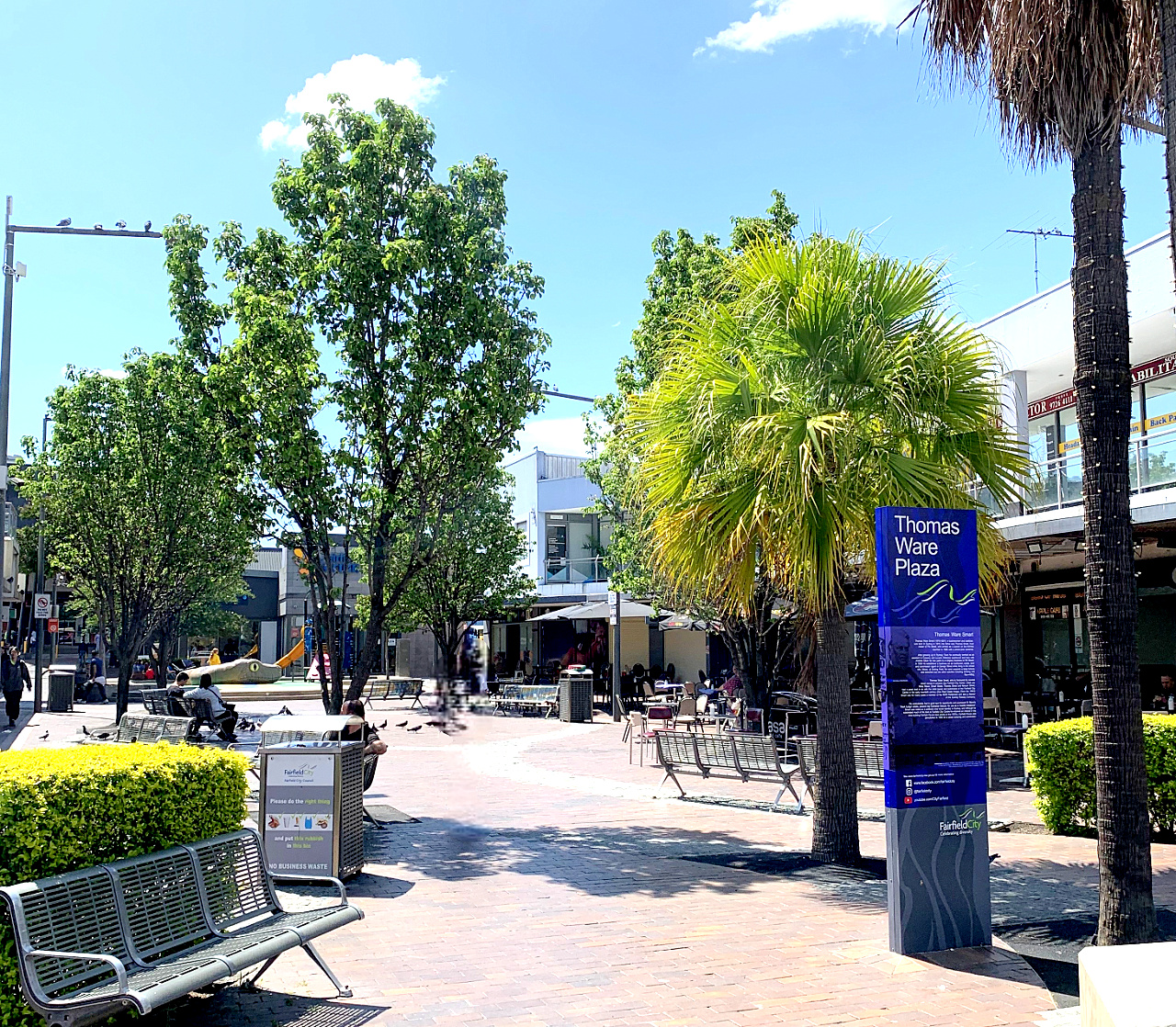
Thomas Ware Plaza, which was named after Thomas Ware Smart

Fairfield City Centre comprises a network of streets serving distinct retail, civic and transport functions. Ware Street and the western section of Spencer Street form the primary retail and pedestrian precinct, characterised by widened footpaths and frequent pedestrian crossings. Other streets, including Smart Street, Barbara Street and The Crescent, accommodate a mix of commercial activity and vehicle traffic, supported by bus routes and signalised intersections. The centre is interconnected by arcades, laneways, pedestrian links and plazas, creating a varied pedestrian network. Mature street trees are present along several corridors, although tree canopy coverage and public seating have been identified as requiring further improvement. Fairfield does not feature a formal 'City Square', though The Crescent Plaza, and Thomas Ware Plaza in Nelson Street, provide a similar sense of fashion to a City Square. Thomas Ware Plaza is a paved civic area with seating and trees adjoining Thomas Ware Plaza Shopping Centre.

The southern side of Fairfield railway station is characterised by a greener streetscape than the northern side, with greater access to open spaces, recreational facilities and street trees. Recreational and ecological areas are located on the periphery of the town centre, although there is no central public open space for community gatherings, and pedestrian connectivity between the town centre, Station Plaza and Crescent Park is limited. Ware Street is characterised by low-level streetscape planting that enhances the pedestrian environment and highlights pedestrian crossings, while Anzac Avenue features a broad boulevard-style streetscape with a substantial tree canopy. The northern part of the town centre is dominated by hard-paved public spaces, with Crescent Park providing its only significant green space, although its amenity and connectivity remain limited. Other public spaces include the Barbara Street Children's Playground, the only public playground in the town centre. Council-operated car parks are also underutilised at various times of the day and night.

=== Water and sewerage ===
The Fairfield Wet Weather Treatment Plant, operated by Sydney Water, is located in the suburb and forms part of the Malabar Wastewater Treatment Plant. The facility provides primary treatment of wastewater during periods of heavy rainfall, helping to reduce sewage overflows into local waterways. The facility provides preliminary treatment by removing debris and sediment before wastewater continues through the sewerage system to the Malabar deep ocean outfall. Upgrades to the plant include new treatment infrastructure, odour control systems and associated works to improve treatment capacity, environmental performance and the resilience of Sydney's wastewater network. The Fairfield Recycled Water Plant is operated by Veolia Water Australia under a licence issued pursuant to the Water Industry Competition Act 2006. An independent operational audit conducted in 2016 found the plant to be operating safely and in full compliance with its licence conditions and regulatory requirements, with no instances of non-compliance identified or recommendations for corrective action.

=== Transport ===
Fairfield railway station, situated on The Crescent and Dale Street, is on the Main Southern railway line. Sydney Trains run frequently from Fairfield to Leppington, Schofields and the City Circle. Fairfield also has a major bus interchange adjacent to the railway station with all services operated by Transit Systems. The Horsley Drive is a prominent road in Fairfield, with a high amount of traffic, and acts as a pivotal entrance to the city from the north and southeast. Hamilton Road to the southwest is another.

=== Schools ===
Public schools in Fairfield include Fairfield High School and Fairfield Public School. Private Schools include Patrician Brothers' College and Our Lady of the Rosary Primary School, which are both catholic schools. Patrician Brothers' Primary School was also previously located in Fairfield but closed in 2006. Alternative High Schools include Indie School - Fairfield campus, and Warakirri College - Fairfield campus a private independent school.

== Demographics ==
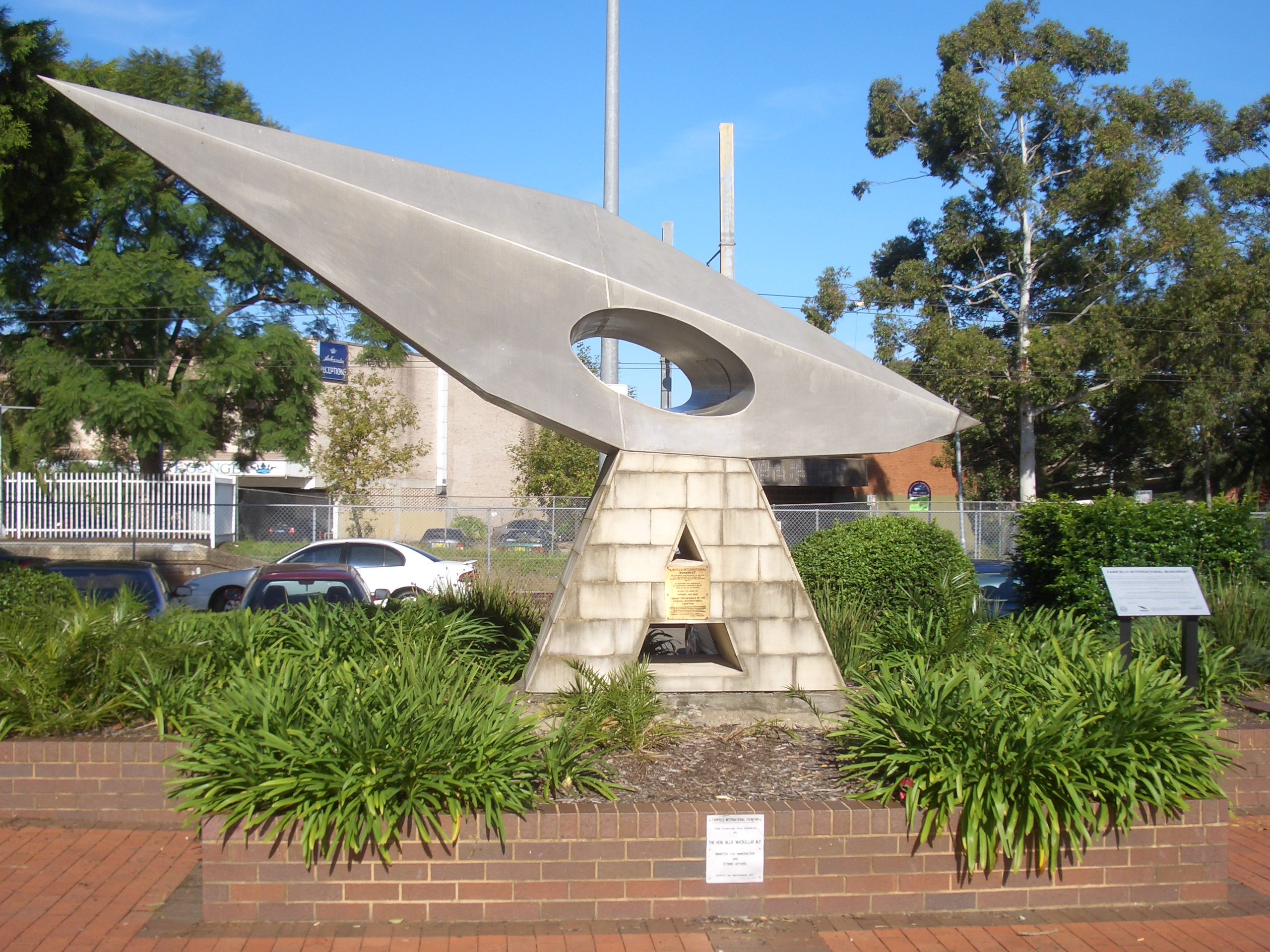
The International Monument, built as a symbol of Fairfield's migrant population

According to the 2021 census, the suburb of Fairfield had a population of 18,596 people, the majority of whom (67.3%) were born outside of Australia.

Country of birth

The largest groups were born in Iraq (22.6%), Vietnam (9.8%), Syria (8.3%), China (2.7%) and Cambodia (2.1%).

Languages

Only 16.0% of people spoke English as their only home language. The most common language spoken other than English is Arabic at 16.7% (mostly Iraqi Arabic and Syrian Arabic), Assyrian Neo-Aramaic at 15.2%, Vietnamese at 12.0%, Chaldean Neo-Aramaic at 5.9% and Mandarin at 3.0%. If the Assyrian and Chaldean varieties were combined, then Neo-Aramaic will be the most common language at 21.1%.

Ethnicity

The most common ethnic groups were Assyrian (15.5%), Vietnamese (11.2%), Chinese (10.2%), Iraqi (10.1%) and Australian (6.9%).

Religion

The top responses for religious affiliation were Catholic (31.1%), No religion (11.8%), Buddhism (11.7%), and Islam (8.5%). Christianity was the largest religious group reported overall (61.8%).

== Politics ==
2023 state elections Electoral district of Fairfield: First preference votes
Labor	51.1%
Liberal	20.3%
Independent	9.6%
Greens	5.6%

== Gallery ==
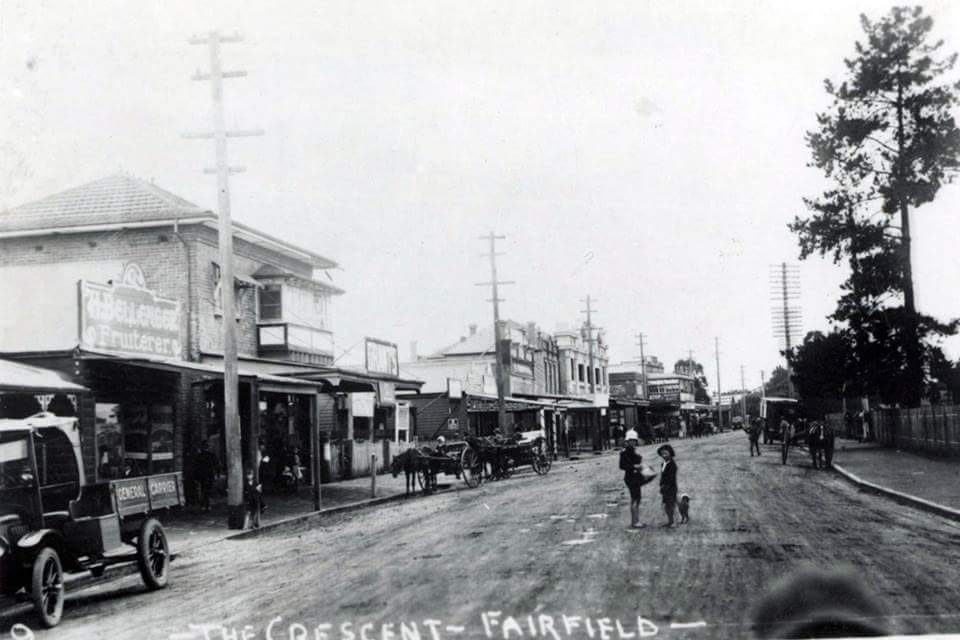
The Crescent, opposite of Fairfield train station, 1890s

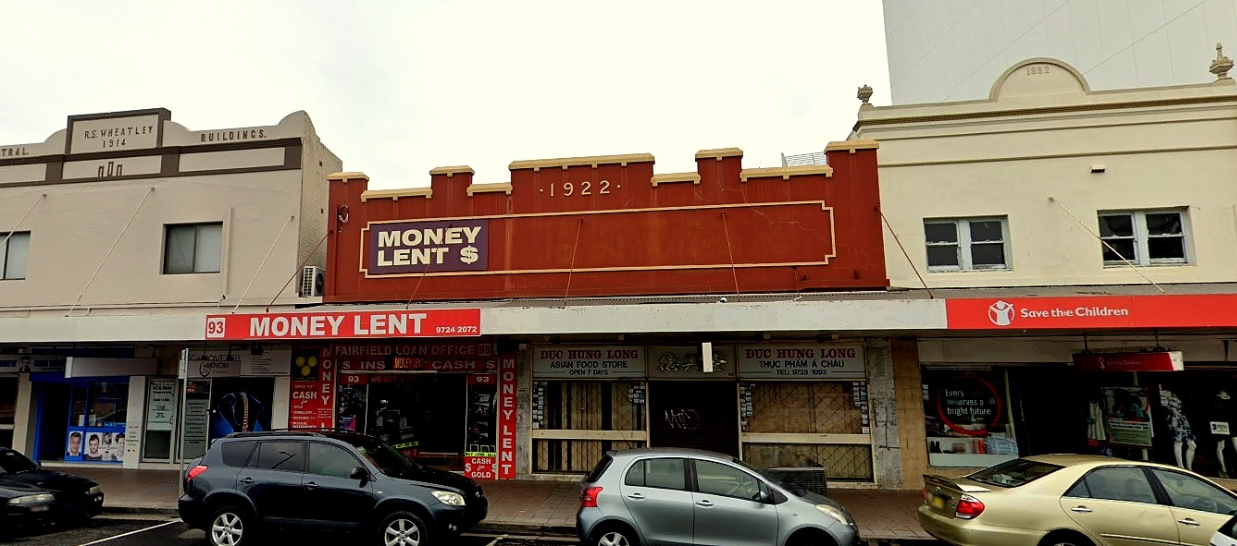
Storefronts dating between 1892 to 1922.

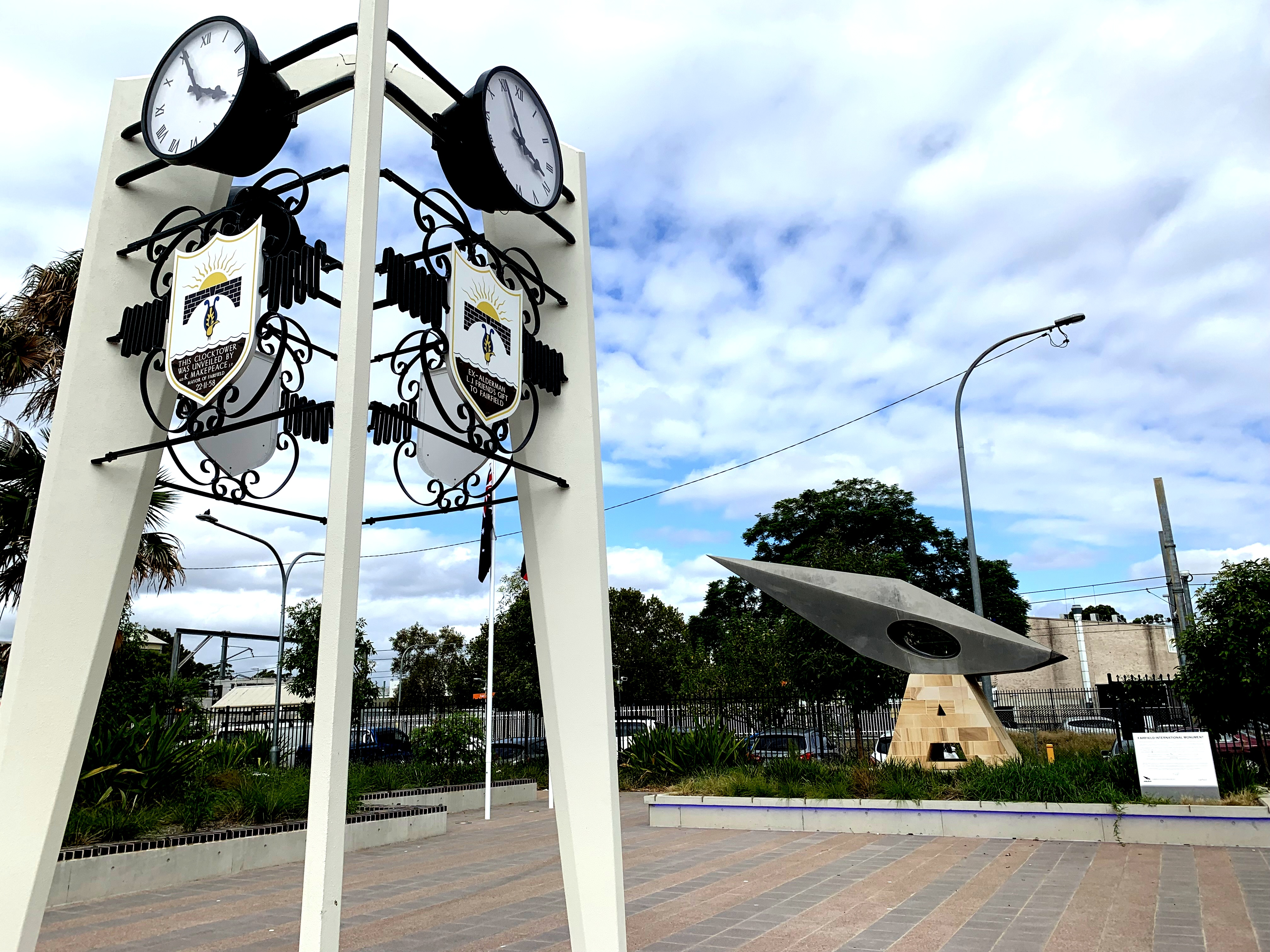
The Clock Tower, erected in 1958

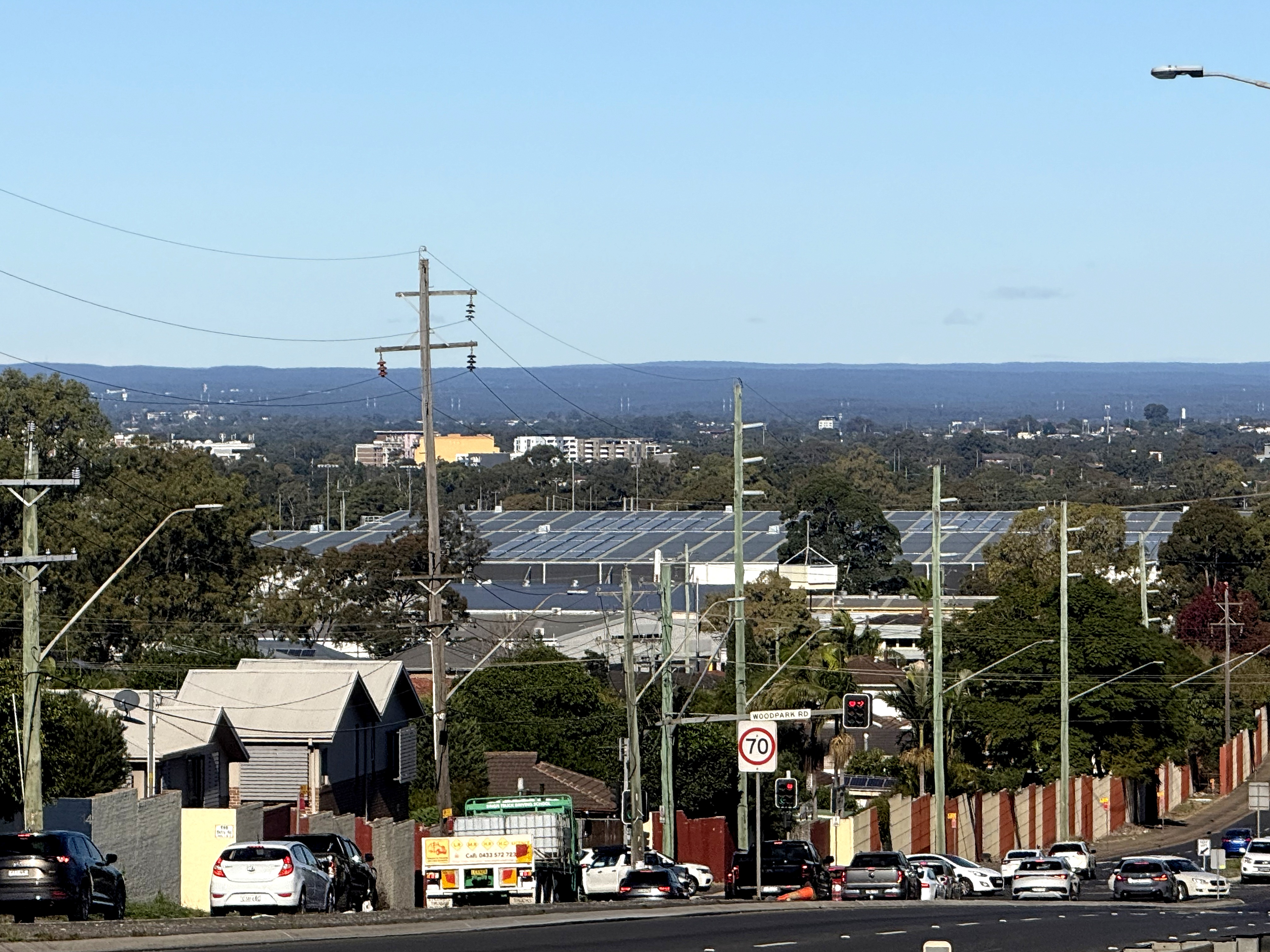
View of Fairfield's topography from the Cumberland Highway, near Canal Road, Woodpark.

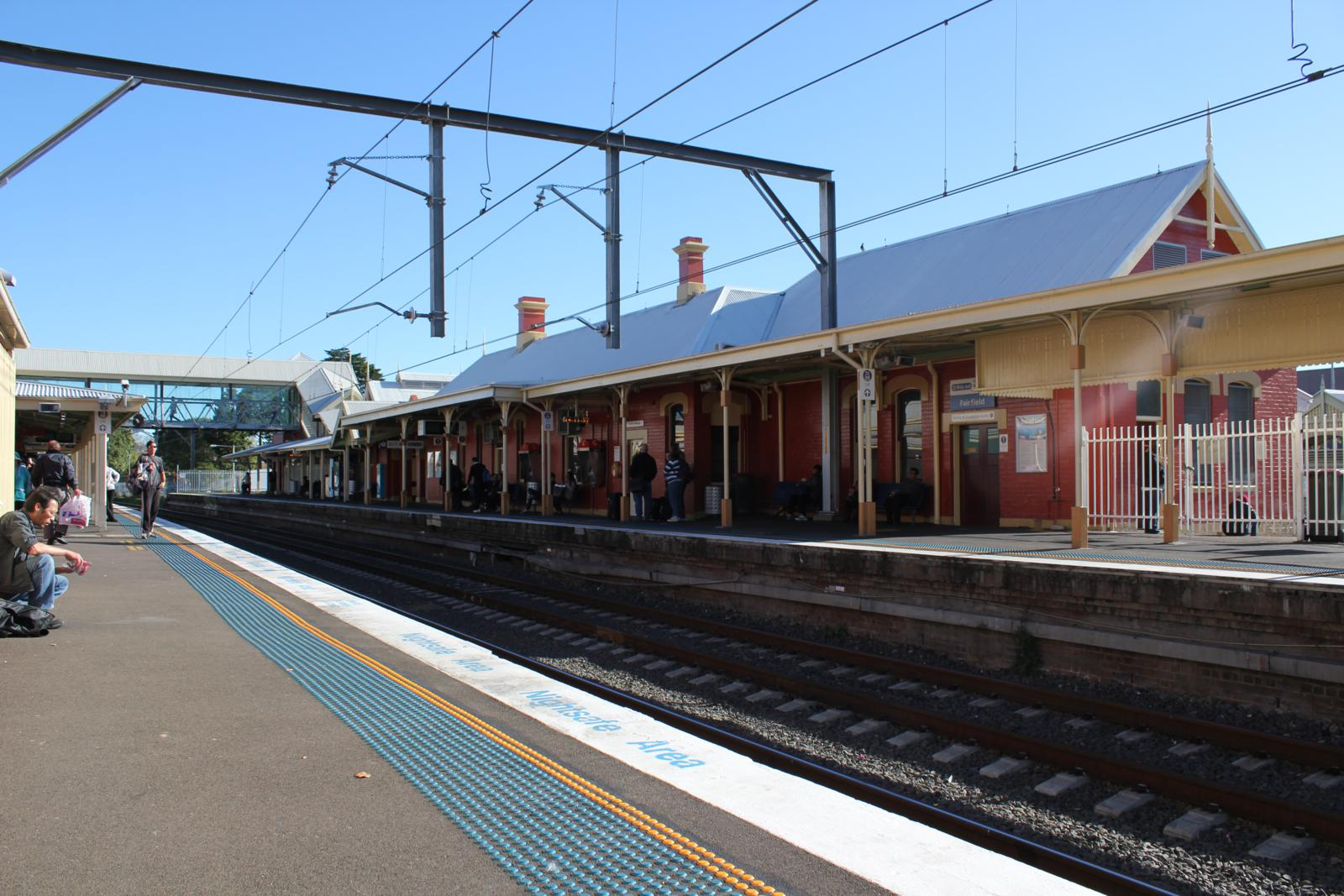
Fairfield railway station

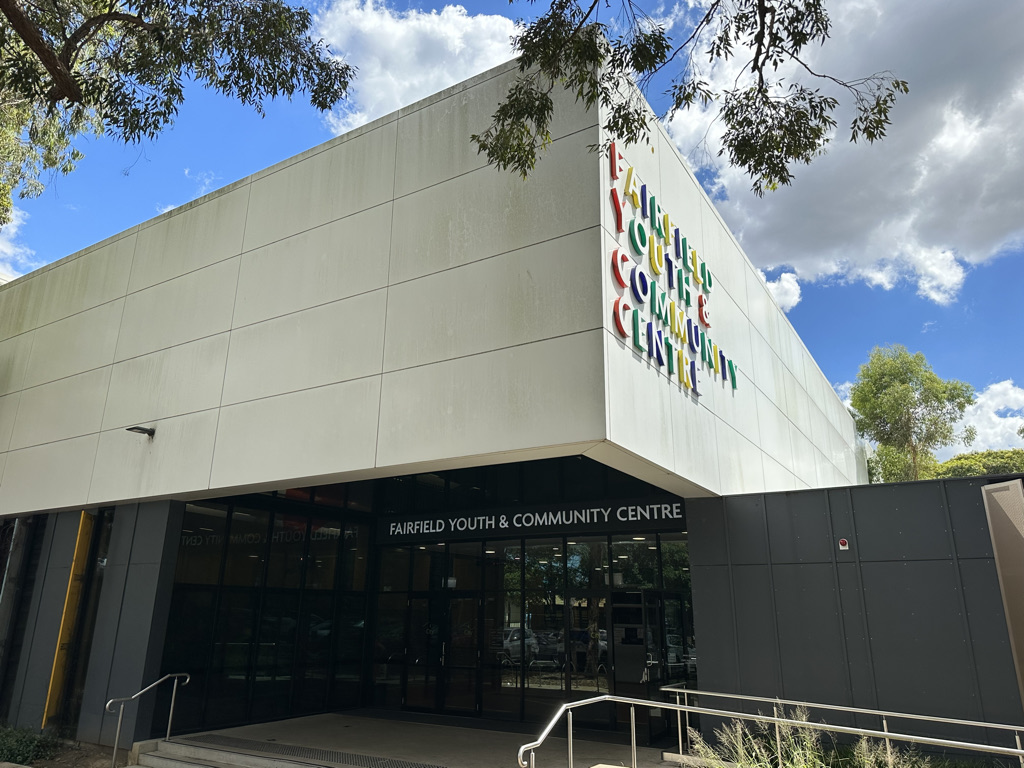
Fairfield Youth and Community Centre

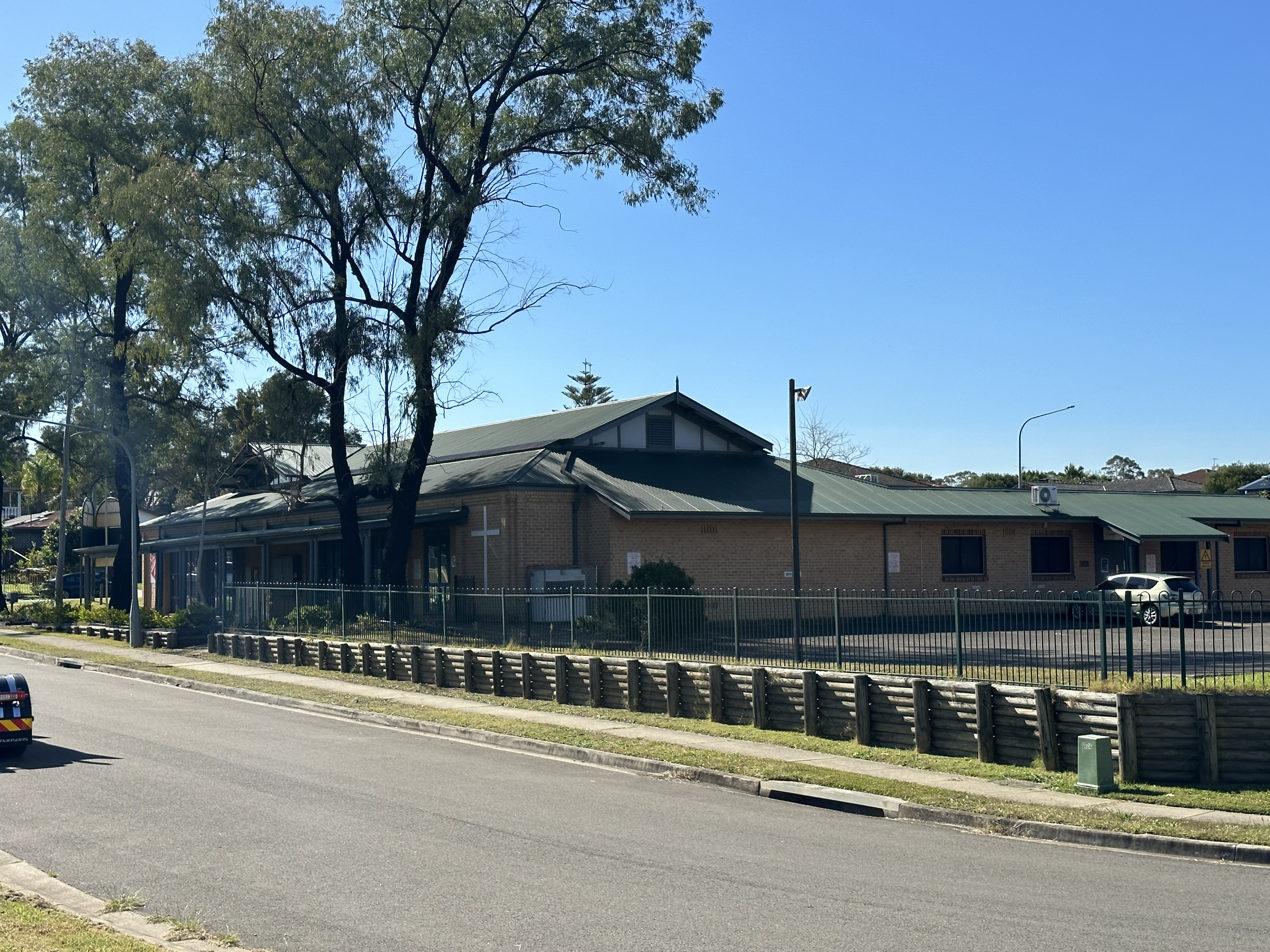
Fairfield City Community Church

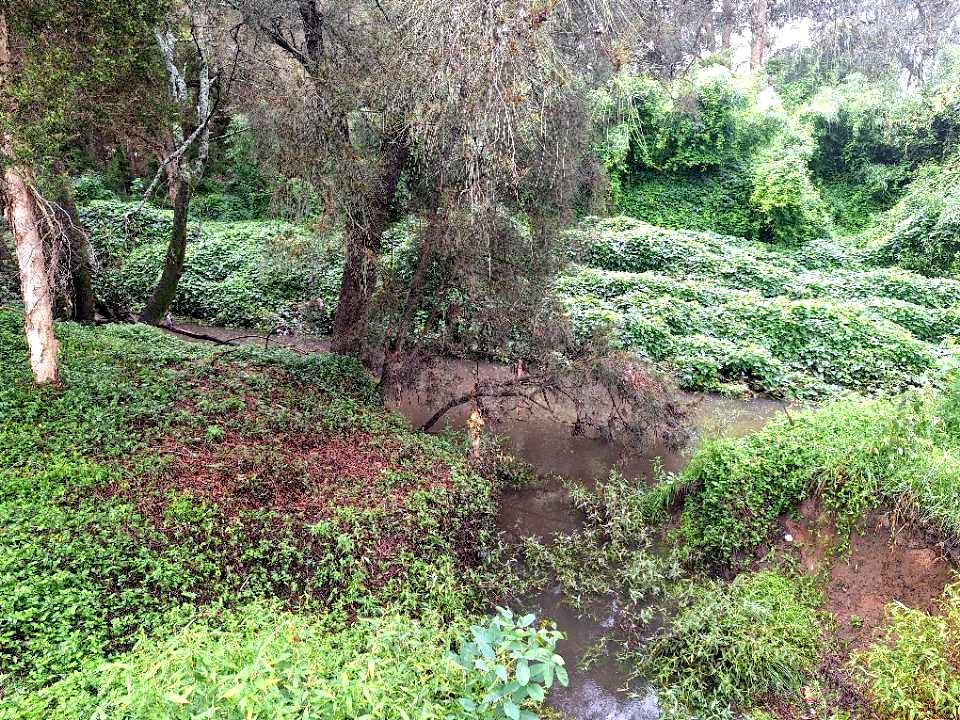
Prospect Creek at Cawarra Park, with weedy vegetation

== Notable people ==
- Mark Bosnich, Socceroos player
- Abbi Church, women's rugby league player
- Mitchell Claydon, Australian-English cricketer
- Jelena Dokić, tennis commentator and former player
- Blake Green, rugby league player
- Evan Green, journalist
- Glenn Grief, rugby league player
- Bing Lee, Founder of the Bing Lee enterprise
- Michael Masi, Formula One race director
- Bill Summerell, rugby league player
- Donnie Sutherland, journalist and television host
- Kyle White, rugby league player
- Ruben Zadkovich, Newcastle Jets and Socceroos player

== See also ==
- Fairfield Hospital (Sydney)
