= Quran Belt =

Region

A Quran Belt is a region where Islamic Values are strong. It is most commonly associated with an area where Islam has historically been influential in northwest China (Xinjiang, Ningxia, Gansu and Qinghai) along the borders of central Asia, Tibet and Mongolia.

Other parts of the world where Islam is or has historically been highly influential have also been referred to as the Quran Belt, such as Kabul and Kandahar in Afghanistan, central Saudi Arabia, Southeastern Anatolia, Iran's Qom, Iraq's Karbala, Pakistan's Khyber Pakhtunkhwa, and India's Jammu and Kashmir territory, Lakshadweep islands, and Barak Valley region of Assam state.

== See also ==
- Bible Belt
