= Bible Belt (Sweden) =

Region of Sweden with high rates of Christianity

Christian Democrats results in the 2014 Swedish general election. The Christian Democrats obtained considerable support in the Christian area in southern Sweden.

The Swedish Bible Belt (Swedish: bibelbältet) is a region centered on Jönköping in northern Småland where demographics show that people are characteristically more religious. In the Bible Belt the free churches are relatively popular in comparison to the Church of Sweden. Of the Småland counties, Jönköping is characterised by the Free Church, Kalmar by the High Church and Kronoberg by the Old Church.

In a broader sense, the Bible Belt refers to the area between Jönköping and Gothenburg.

There are also numerous conservative Laestadian Lutherans in the Torne Valley area in the far north of the country.

== See also ==
- Laestadianism
