= Prospect Creek (New South Wales) =

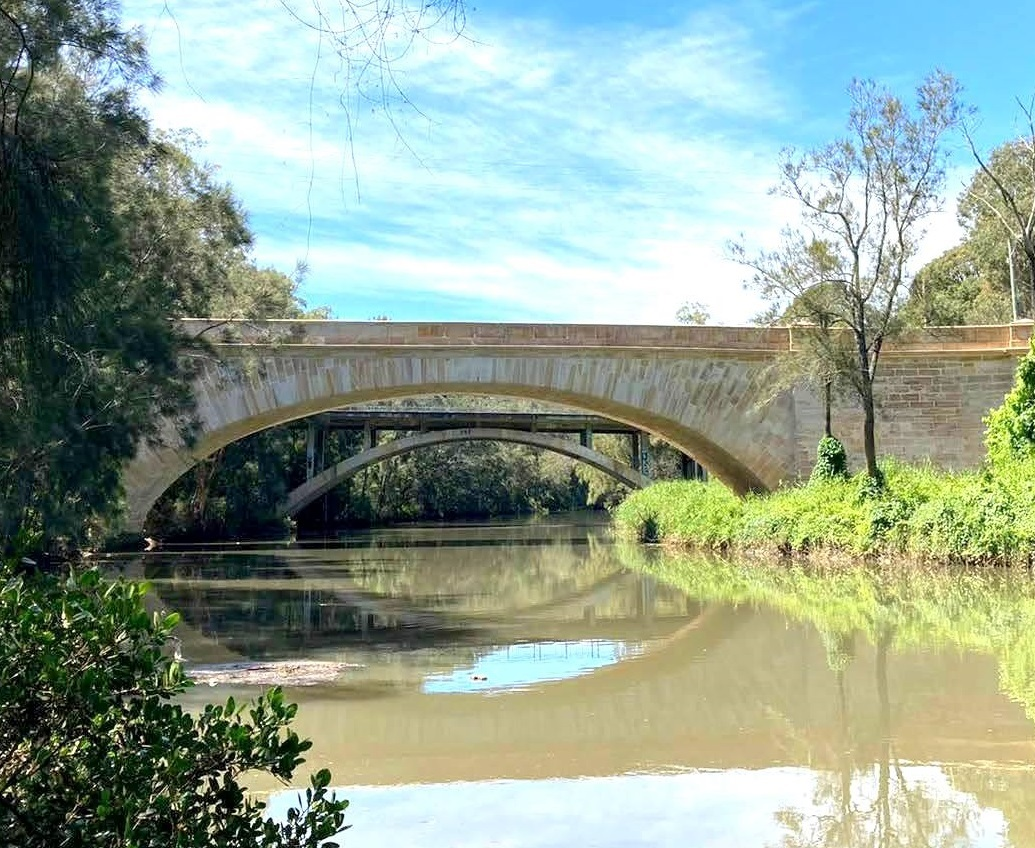
- Prospect Creek flowing below Lansdowne Bridge (Hume Highway), Carramar

Location
- Country: Australia
- State: New South Wales
- Region: Sydney Basin (IBRA), Greater Western Sydney, Canterbury-Bankstown
- LGAs: Blacktown, Cumberland, Fairfield, Liverpool, Canterbury-Bankstown

Physical characteristics
- Source: Prospect Reservoir
  - location: north of Bulls Hill, Prospect
  - coordinates: 33°50′2″S 150°53′20″E
- Mouth: confluence with the Georges River
  - location: Dhurawal Bay, Georges Hall
  - coordinates: 33°54′35″S 150°58′25″E
- Length: 26 km (16 mi)
- Basin size: 98 km^{2} (38 sq mi)
- Width
  - minimum: 5 m (16 ft)
  - average: 11 m (36 ft)
  - maximum: 30 m (98 ft)
- Depth
  - minimum: 1 m (3.3 ft)
  - average: 1.5 m (4.9 ft)
  - maximum: 3 m (9.8 ft)

Basin features
- Progression: Georges River → Botany Bay
- River system: Georges River
- Tributaries
  - left: Burns Creek
  - right: Orphan School Creek
- Dam / Reservoir: Prospect Reservoir

Prospect Creek is an urban watercourse of the Georges River catchment that is located in the western region of Sydney, in New South Wales, Australia. Situated within the local government areas of Fairfield City and Canterbury-Bankstown Councils, the creek is 26 kilometres (16 mi) long, starting at the Prospect Reservoir at the top of the catchment and flows south-east to the Georges River at Georges Hall, as its tributary. In the north, the creek forms the border between Cumberland and Fairfield City Councils. Running through a prominent open space corridor, Prospect Creek drains the encompassing floodplain.

The creek offers 8 km (5.0 mi) of recreational area and winds through a number of parks and reserves, including walkways and cycling paths that parallel the creek. As Prospect Reservoir forms a part of the Sydney metropolitan water supply, the flow of the creek is regulated in accordance with the operational requirements of Sydney Water. The creek's catchment area covers approximately 98 square kilometres (38 sq mi) and is predominantly urbanised, comprising industrial and residential areas as well as recreational open space.

For the first British settlers, the creek and the surrounds offered essential food and water resources, and thereby encouraged the development of local agriculture and industry. At time of its European discovery, Prospect Creek was a series of freshwater ponds, rather than an unbroken stream, particularly north of Carramar. During the early 20th century, the lower Prospect Creek was a large part of life for residents in the Fairfield LGA area with numerous pleasure grounds and recreation spaces, that included boating. The lower Prospect Creek (in the south) is affected by tides, and that part of the creek was referred to as a 'river' by the locals in the early 20th century.

== History ==
=== Indigenous ===
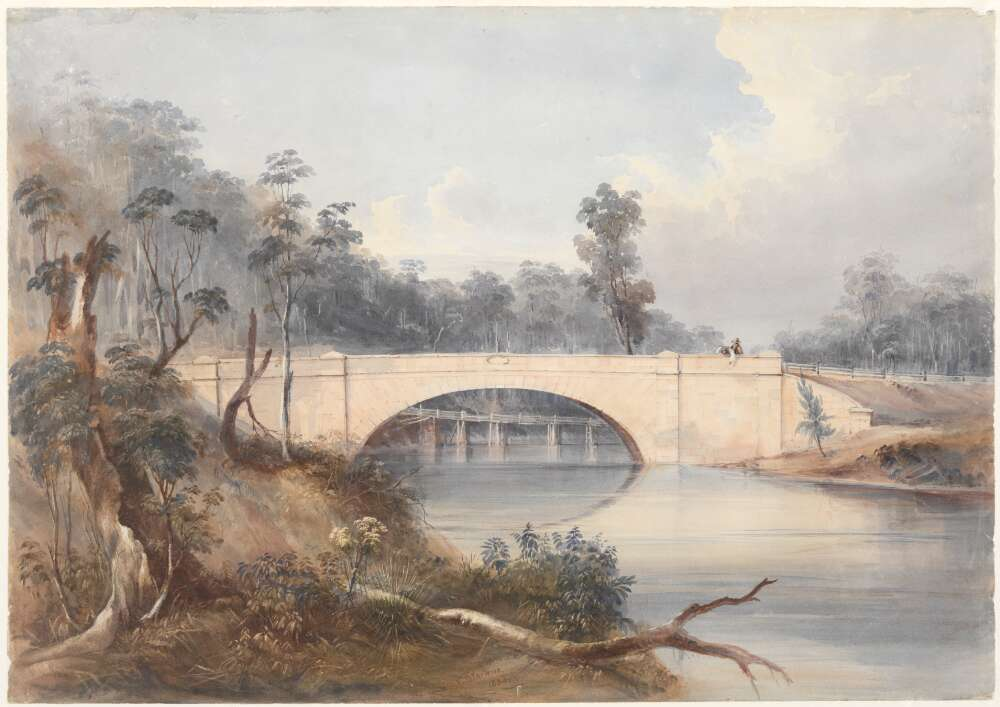
Lansdowne Bridge over Prospect Creek, 1836

Prospect Creek was a traditional travel route that connected the Darug and D'harawal people. Early colonial evidence also indicates that the Bidjigal people lived closed to the creek. There have been Aboriginal camps along the creek and as well as other areas of Sydney through the late 19th century and to as late as the 1950s.

For the Aboriginal Australians, the creek and surrounding areas provided areas for hunting and gathering. Casuarina nuts were used in traditional medicine and basalt pebbles were used to create traditional axes. The Cabrogal people near the creek acquired tidal system plants and animals, including bankias ('cobra worms'), woodlands foods such as possum and freshwater fish. Around thirty sites with Aboriginal artefacts, such as stone tools, had been identified around Prospect Creek. The area near the Lansdowne Bridge at the creek, in what is now Shortland Brush, was a traditional sit down place for the Indigenous Australians as it featured ample aquatic and land foods.

=== Colonial era (1780s–1880s) ===
In the late 1780s, William Bradley went on an expedition from Rose Hill to Prospect Creek to determine whether Prospect Creek led to Botany Bay. Bradley described a place on the Creek where the water changed from fresh to salt with a drop of 4 feet (1.2 m). The presence of salt water confirmed Prospect Creek's connection to the sea. Prospect Creek provided a camp for Pemulwuy, a Bidjigal warrior leader who led in the resistance against the British during the early colonisation. In 1785, George Bass and Matthew Flinders began exploring the Georges River and went as far as Prospect Creek. In 1789, Governor Arthur Phillip probed the country between Salt Pan Creek beginning at Prospect Creek.

In July 1791, Tench and William Dawes travelled south from Rose Hill in search of a large river reportedly several miles to the south, which Tench wrote they expected might prove a "second Nile or Ganges". Instead, they reached what Tench described as a saltwater creek communicating with Botany Bay. Having expected to find fresh water, the party spent what he described as a "miserable night" on its banks without drinking water. Historian Robert Haworth identifies the watercourse encountered by Tench and Dawes as Prospect Creek, placing the site of their "second Nile" and overnight stay at its mouth near Georges Hall, where it joins the Georges River. Other accounts have placed the expedition near the present-day Lansdowne Bridge. In January 1797, Governor John Hunter examined Prospect Creek while tracing the Georges River for approximately 40 kilometres (25 mi), before travelling to Parramatta.

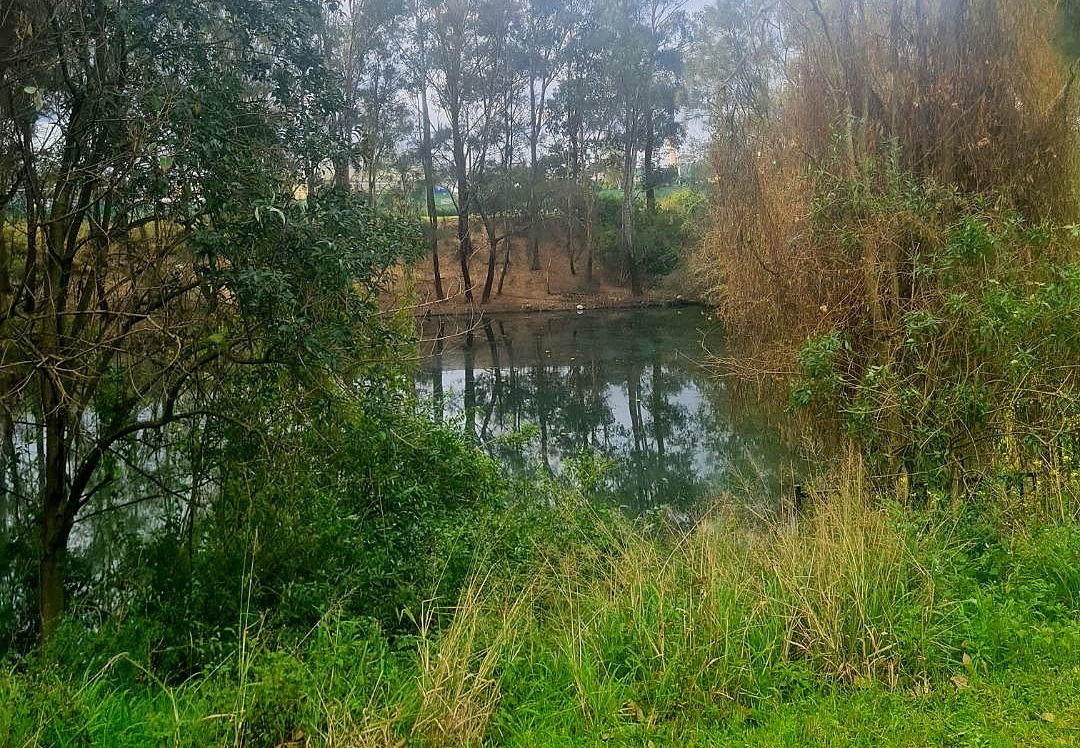
The pond along the creek in Smithfield is reminiscent of the “chain of ponds” that existed there during colonisation.

A feedlot for government cattle was constructed in front of "a fine chain of fresh water ponds", which was Prospect Creek around what is now Kenyon's Bridge in Smithfield, where 100 acres (40 ha) of she-oak forest was cut and another 50 acres (20 ha) burned down. In 1798, First Fleet Captain George Johnston received a land grant and constructed his first home located near Prospect Creek, close to Henry Lawson Drive and Beatty Parade. In 1800, just beside Prospect Creek, Lieutenant John Shortland from the First Fleet acquired an initial grant of 100 acres (40 ha) over the northern part of Lansdowne Reserve which he increased to 380 acres (150 ha). In 1802, French explorer Francis Barrallier led an exploring team to the Gandangarra, where they sought passageway through the Blue Mountains in the southwest as they took a route that bypasses the marshy areas of Prospect Creek.

On January 1, 1806, two grants were made to James Gowan, one of them being on the northern bank of the creek. On January 1810, settlers Thomas Hanson and James Larra also received land grants just north of the creek, proximate to the Carramar railway station. In 1820s, Joseph Kenyon's Woodlands on the eastern bank of Prospect Creek were described as having "immaculate lawns", "ornamental gardens" and a "showplace of the district". In 1832 Surveyor-General Thomas Mitchell commissioned David Lennox for a sum of £1,083 ($2,166) to build Lansdowne Bridge "at the intersection of Prospect Creek and Southern Street"; it was completed in 1836. Henry Whitaker purchased land near Prospect Creek in East Fairfield and established 'Orchardleigh', which is now part of Fairfield East.

In 1848, German explorer Ludwig Leichhardt and politician Sir Henry Parkes cooled their feet in Prospect Creek near Jacob Stein's vineyard (Sand Hill Farm) in Carramar. By the 1850s, there were numerous grand homes and estates beside the creek that became more accessible with the advent of the railways. By 1860, an industrial zone (that included tannery, flour mills, a brewery) also became established in the area near the Prospect Creek. In the 1880s, a woolwashing workshop was constructed on the creek at what is Fairfield Park Precinct today, with a brick weir to "keep a head of fresh water from the salt tides".

=== Recreational development (1900s–1950s) ===
In the first half of the 20th century, Prospect Creek became one of South-western Sydney's principal recreational destinations. Attractions including Latty's Pleasure Grounds, the Butterfly Hall and Hollywood Park drew visitors with the area's rural character and proximity to the waterway. The first games of Rugby League football in Australia were trial matches held at Latty's Pleasure Grounds in Lansvale in early 1908. From 1925, the Widemere Quarry Line crossed the creek until its closure in 1945. Between the 1890s and around 1941, boating was a popular pastime, with visitors hiring boats from Latty's Boatshed in what is now Heiden Park at Carramar. During the early twentieth century, the creek was valued for its clear waters and bushland setting, and frequently featured in postcards and land sale advertisements, where it was often described as a river. Contemporary accounts praised its "sparkling clear" waters and referred to the surrounding landscape as "the loveliest spot in the Southern Districts". The shaded river frontage and natural swimming holes attracted between 200 and 300 bathers on busy weekends, with more than 1,000 people using that section of the river each week.

In the early 1920s, the New South Wales Government Railways operated special weekend excursion trains from Sydney CBD to Fairfield, bringing hundreds of visitors for picnics and other recreational activities at attractions including Latty's Pleasure Grounds, the Butterfly Hall, Lansdowne Reserve and Hollywood Park. Contemporary reports described the pleasure grounds and Prospect Creek as more crowded than ever before. Despite their popularity, local newspapers criticised the inadequate public amenities, calling for improved changing sheds and the replacement of a springboard that had been washed away in floods. The Lansdowne Bridge area became another popular recreation spot, where the Garden of Eden Picnic Grounds offered a boat hire service and refreshment rooms. Hollywood Park, near the confluence of Prospect Creek and the Georges River, was also a popular picnic destination.

In the early 1920s, a pedestrian bridge was constructed across the creek, linking the end of Haughton Street with Fairfield Precinct Park. It was later replaced by the concrete footbridge known as Alderton Crossing, named in honour of the Alderton family, who had a long association with the Fairfield area. During the mid twentieth century, Prospect Creek and the Georges River were popular for swimming, fishing and prawning. Residents remembered a number of informally named swimming holes, including "Pirate's Hole", "Rocky", "Sandy", "Lehmann's" and "Swinging Bridge", and some recalled diving from the Carramar railway bridge into the creek. At the time, the reach of the creek from Vine Street to its confluence with the Georges River was commonly referred to as the George River, Prospect River and Fairfield's River because of its width and navigability by small watercraft.

=== Decline and legacy (1940s–present) ===
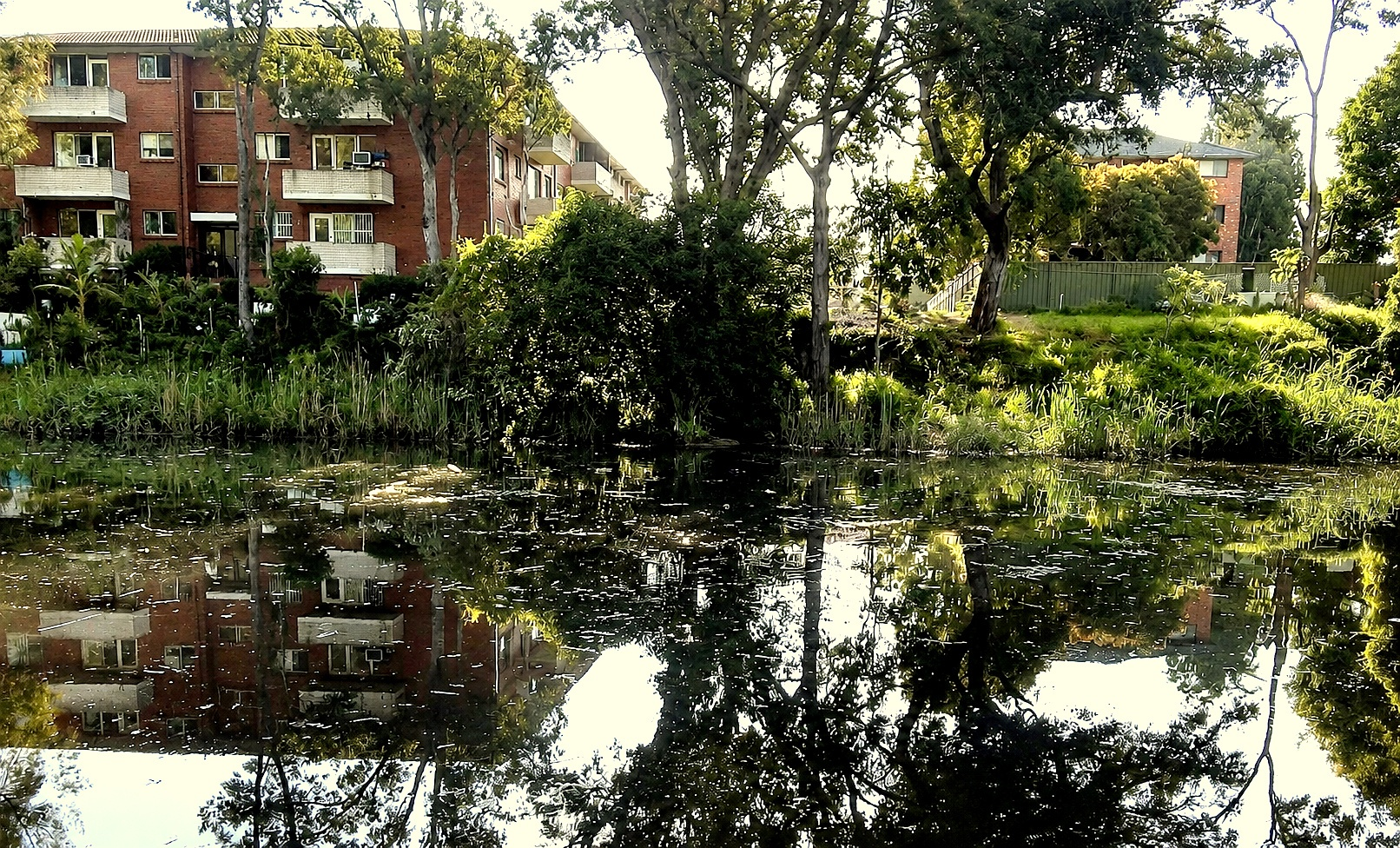
The creek flowing near a neighborhood in Carramar, with units constructed in the 1970s and 1980s

Despite occasional reports of shark attacks in the Georges River and Prospect Creek, visitors continued to flock to the area on weekends aboard special "pleasure grounds" trains for picnics, organised sports and other outdoor activities. The Latty family sold the business in the 1930s, but the boatshed continued to bear their name until it closed in the late 1950s due to successive floods, siltation and pollution of the creek. With the outbreak of the Second World War in 1939, public access to the creek became restricted because of wartime security measures. Following the Japanese attack on Sydney Harbour in May 1942, the Royal Australian Navy stationed a flotilla of small boats at the popular swimming areas known as "Swingy" and "Sandy" on Prospect Creek, while their crews were accommodated in a houseboat at Latty's Boatsheds. During the 1950s, a few members of local Protestant congregations were baptised in Prospect Creek.

From the 1970s to 1990s, a small amusement park named Magic Kingdom operated in Lansvale on the banks of the creek and was a popular attraction for visitors. Over time the creek has also slowly lost its shine as successive governments and communities turned their backs on the waterway, coupled with industrialisation occurring upstream leading to the declining water quality, which is reflected in warnings today from authorities to avoid swimming in the catchment. In 2005, a chain of illustrative Indigenous artworks were placed on the banks of the creek to encourage awareness about the Indigenous identity of the creek's corridor. The project constituted of four groups of artworks and path markers, displaying the flora and fauna of Prospect Creek, as observed by the Darug people. The artworks include four stories passed down through generations of Darug people, such as, the Australian raven and crows, The Eagle Warrior, The Casuarinas, and The Story of the Local Wattles.

In 2023, Sydney Water Corporation was convicted and fined $200,000 in the Land and Environment Court of NSW after 282,000 litres of sewage was spilled into the creek. The creek is no longer used for recreation to the same extent as it was in the mid-20th century, when residents commonly swam, boated and fished in its cleaner waters. Urban development, stormwater runoff and occasional sewage overflows have contributed to a decline in Prospect Creek's water quality in recent decades.

== Geography ==
=== Course ===
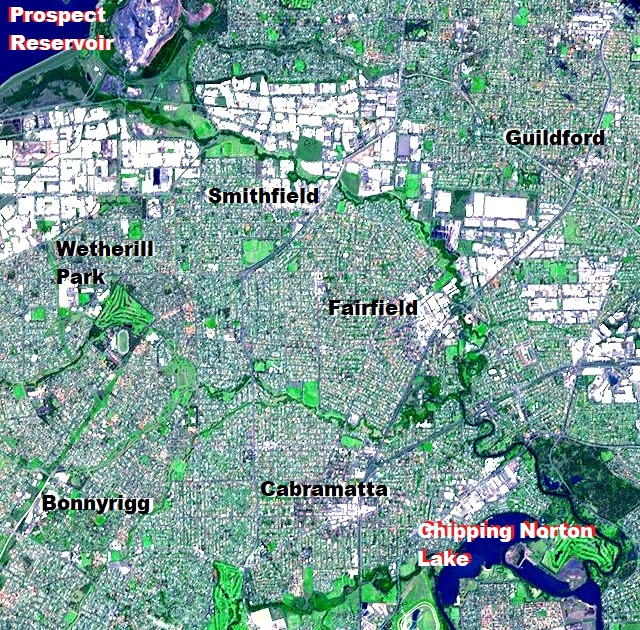
The creek’s course through the green belt, flowing southeast from Prospect Reservoir to Chipping Norton Lake

Prospect Creek flows south from Prospect Reservoir, just north of Bulls Hill in Prospect, within the Blacktown local government area. It then streams southeast through the local government areas of Cumberland, Fairfield, Liverpool and Bankstown, where it reaches its confluence with the Georges River at Georges Hall, as it flows into Dhurawal Bay in the Chipping Norton Lakes. From north to south, the creek runs across the suburbs of Wetherill Park, Greystanes, Smithfield, Fairfield, Yennora, Canley Vale, Carramar, Lansdowne and Georges Hall. The creek's corridor extends across the Aboriginal Land Councils of Deerubbin and Gandangara.

Near its upper reaches around Widemere Road, the watercourse is considerably narrower and shallower than farther downstream, giving it the appearance of a small brook. The channel in this area is relatively poorly defined; upstream of Widemere Road, a concrete-lined stormwater channel draining the Wetherill Park industrial area terminates approximately 200 m (660 ft) before the road, beyond which drainage continues through an ill-defined depression towards the creek. From northwest to southeast, the creek crosses roads such as Prospect Highway, Gipps Road, Cumberland Highway, Fairfield Road, The Horsley Drive, Fairfield Street, Vine Street, Hume Highway and then meanders parallel of Henry Lawson Drive as it heads south to Chipping Norton Lake (Dhurawal Bay). Prospect Creek's tidal limit is located around the Liverpool & Inner West Line crossing at the Canley Vale/Carramar border and the tidal reach may extend to the confluence of Orphan School Creek just south of Riverview Road at the Fairfield/Canley Vale border.

The lower reaches of Prospect Creek are tidal, with the tidal limit occurring at a weir near Vine Street in Fairfield. A survey of tidal limits in New South Wales identified the limit as the weir behind 97 Vine Street, approximately 225 m (738 ft) downstream of Konnemanns Bridge. Consequently, the creek downstream of Vine Street is influenced by tides, while the upstream reaches are non-tidal. Bridges crossed include Konemanns Bridge (Vine Street) at Fairfield; Carramar Railway Bridge (Sandal Crescent) which was constructed when the Main South Line was extended from Regents Park to Cabramatta in 1924; Waterside Crescent Pedestrian Bridge, which connects Cook Park in Canley Vale to Carrawood Park in Carramar; and Lansdowne Bridge, a sandstone arch bridge which has the largest span of any masonry bridge in Australia.

=== Environment ===
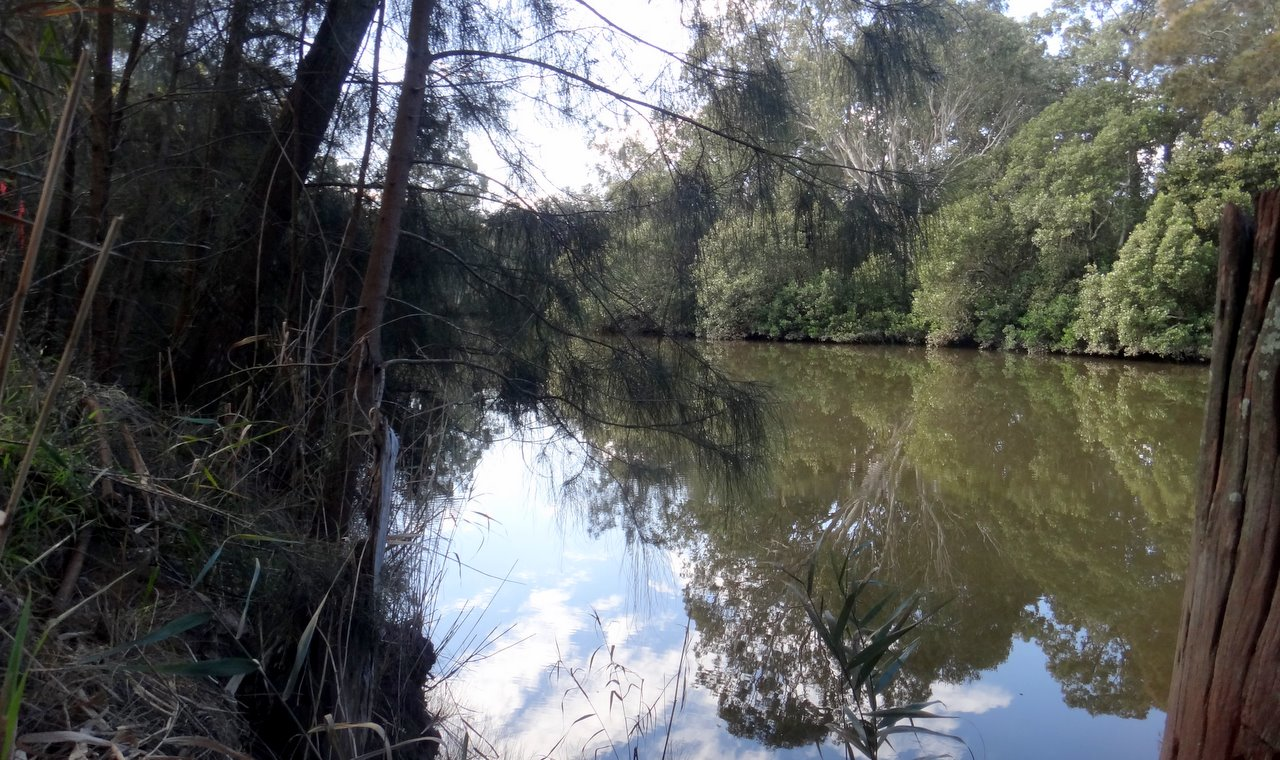
The creek at Lansvale, where it becomes tidal and is surrounded by River-flat eucalypt forest

The creek's strip, being located between urban and industrial area, is a green natural corridor used for recreation purposes and ecological conservation, in addition to the environment having indigenous significance. The creek consists of remnant and altered vegetation communities, artificial and natural wetlands, grassy open areas and as well as detention basins. Its riparian vegetation is rather diverse and often compact, which consists of around 125 native and 96 introduced species. The creek features remnant vegetation ecozones such as Coastal Swamp Oak Forest, River-flat eucalypt forest, Western Sydney Dry Rainforest (at sheltered lower slopes and gullies) and Shale-Gravel Transition Forest, with the first two being the most prominent zones.

The wetland parts south of the Cumberland Highway feature the Australasian swamphen, the Australian wood duck, the Black swan, and the Night Heron, in addition to frogs, mammals, reptiles, fish (mullet, bream, black fish, carp) and other invertebrates. The strip between Widemere Road and the Cumberland Highway is the most abundant with species and lacks weeds, and therefore it is the most ecologically important zone. Its detention basins help the creek during periods of powerful flows, thereby hindering the banks from eroding.

Within the past 200 years the creek has been impacted by the surrounding unsustainable rural and urban development which has degraded its natural environment, in addition to the creek's health also being an issue with several State Government accounts. Industrial discharge (through stormwater), illegal dumping of cars and wastes, algae bloom, grease spills and raised fecal coliform levels have impacted the creek, in addition to a significant pesticide leak in February 2002. Revegetation and works improving the habitat on the creek's strip have been running since the 1986, which included removal of weeds and comprehensive tree planting (generally between Gipps Road and the Cumberland Highway). The Friends of Prospect Creek (FPC) was a group created to arrange successful Clean Up Australia Days, where local residents volunteer to clean up waste and plant over 17,000 trees and shrubs in Long Street Park at Smithfield, the location where the Warali Wali Track of the Great Kai'mia Way route was planned.

=== Recreation ===
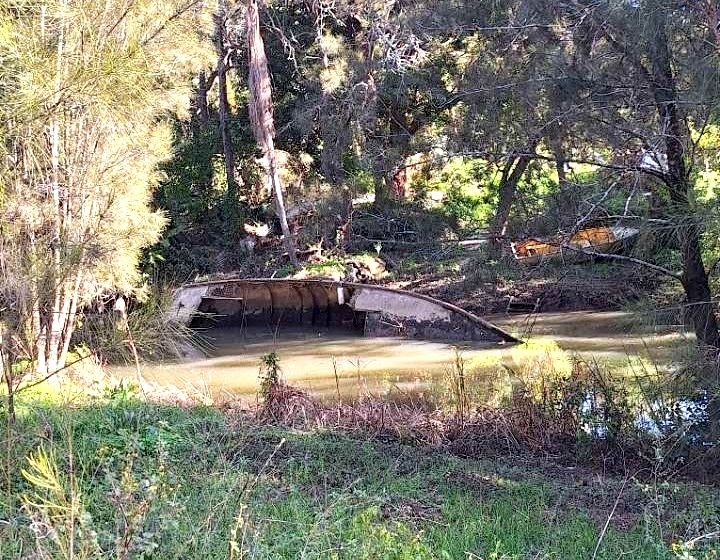
From the early 1900s, Heiden Park featured recreational boating until its abandonment in 1941. Wrecked boats here have become a subject of ruins photography.

The most prominent recreational areas along the creek corridor include Gipps Road Sporting Complex, Rosford Park and the contiguous Long Street Park in Smithfield; Fairfield Park Precinct, Cawarra Park and Makepeace Oval in Fairfield; Fairfield Road Park in Yennora; Carrawood Park and Heiden Park in Carramar; Mirambeena Regional Park in Lansdowne; and Garrison Point and Henry Lawson Reserve in Georges Hall, listed from northwest to southeast. The creek also flows along the western fringes of Fairfield High School and just north of the Bland Oak, a historic tree. Recreational activities along the creek corridor include dog walking, cycling, playing and observing local wildlife.

Several walking and cycling paths parallel the creek. The longest continuous shared path is the Prospect Creek cycleway, which follows the creek from Widmere Road, adjacent to the Liverpool–Parramatta T-way on the northern periphery of Wetherill Park, to Fairfield Road Park in Yennora, opposite Yennora Fire Station. Other sections of shared path continue from Cook Park in Canley Vale, crossing the creek into Carrawood Park in Carramar, before continuing towards Lansdowne Bridge and the Hume Highway. The path then passes through Shortland Brush and Flinders Slopes in Mirambeena Regional Park and ends at Garrison Point Reserve in Georges Hall. The walking and cycling paths pass through areas of Australian bushland, with native trees such as eucalypts occurring along the water's edge.

The creek corridor's features interpretive signs for visitors to represent the creek in terms of Aboriginal legacy. Its visitors include local residents (as well as those outside Fairfield and Cumberland LGA areas), employees, sport teams, bush regeneration groups and school students, and is even used as a commuting substitute to driving. Though surveys have shown that the visitation rate is low, and people in the area are not informed about its existence. Most forms of fishing are permitted in Prospect Creek, in both the tidal (lower) and freshwater (upper) catchments with fishing subject to bag and size limit regulations. All vessels are permitted to travel along the creek including jet skies and boats, although a limit of 8 knots (9.2 mph) is enforced by the relevant authorities.

== Catchment ==
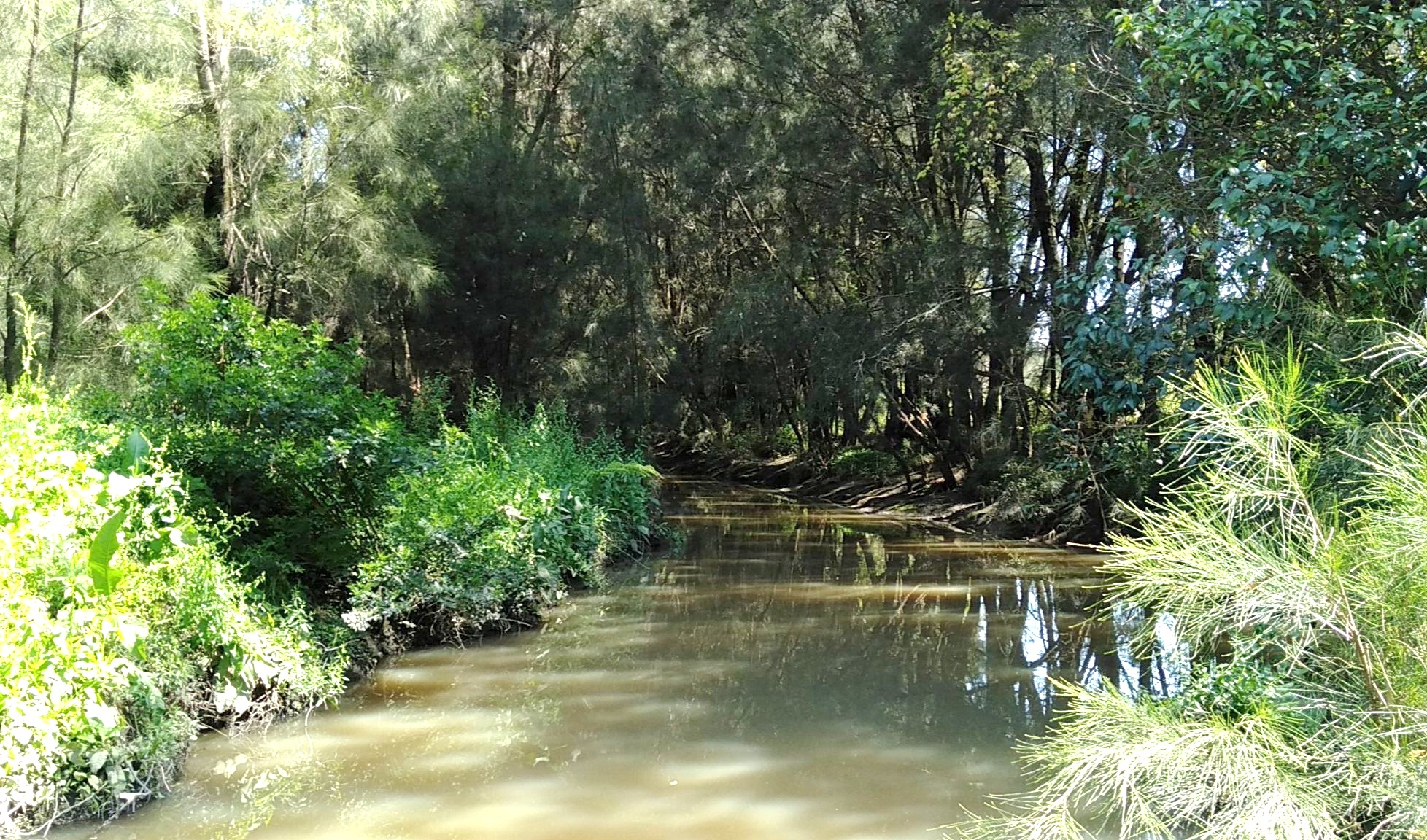
The creek near Gipps Road Park, Smithfield, bordered by Swamp Oak riparian vegetation, including Casuarina glauca.

The tidal reach of the creek below the Vine Street weir, with a broad channel bordered by dense riparian vegetation.

The creek's catchment area itself is a sub-catchment of the Georges River catchment, where it covers an area of 98 square kilometres (38 sq mi). Areas within the Prospect Creek Catchment include, Fairfield City (65.6%), Cumberland Council (13.7%), Canterbury-Bankstown (10.5%), Blacktown (7.8%) and Liverpool (2.4%). Some of the streams and drainage lines in the catchment do not permanently transport water, and rather would only do so after rain events.

Burns Creek, Clear Paddock Creek, Green Valley Creek and Orphan School Creek are all part of the Prospect Creek catchment, in addition to being Prospect Creek's tributaries (with Burns Creek being the smallest tributary of the creek at Fairfield East). Wetlands and ponds within the Prospect Creek catchment include, Kaluna Reserve near Cumberland Highway in Smithfield, Gipps Road Pond at Jack Ferguson Reserve, De Freitas Wetland at Vine Street, Clarevale Wetland, Lake Mirambeena (Lansdowne) and Lake Gillawarna (Georges Hall).

=== Drainage systems ===
As urban development grew in the area, several gullies and waterways that traditionally drained runoff into Prospect Creek were replaced by stormwater pipes. Storm water drainage release into the creek at roads such as Long Street, Cumberland Highway and Gipps Road. There are sewage and water supply pipes that are affiliated with Long Street Park and Fairfield Road Park facilities, and as well as a sewer main on Long Street, and a portion of the Sydney Water Supply Pipeline that meanders along the western border of the creek. Other systems that supply to the Prospect Creek include:

- Wetherill Park Drain, a concrete bordered canal that releases water near the source of the creek
- Smithfield Main Drain, a natural waterway and piped system which drains areas of Fairfield West, Fairfield Heights, Smithfield and Smithfield West.
- Bellingers Drain, a piped system that drains portions of Fairfield and Fairfield Heights, where it discharges into a 400 metres (1,300 ft) long natural waterway before it runs into the creek

There are catchment drains that lead to Prospect Creek in a northeasterly direction; They consist of three concrete-lined, trapezoidal-shaped channels that are 3.8 kilometres (2.4 mi) in length, 1.5 metres (4 ft 11 in) to 1.75 metres (5 ft 9 in) in width and a height that ranges from approximately 2.0 metres (6 ft 7 in) to 3 metres (9.8 ft):

- The "Main Channel" is 1,655 metres (5,430 ft) long, which is a culvert underneath the Cowpasture Road/The Horsley Drive roundabout that leads to its outlet into Prospect Creek, adjacent to Widemere Road in Wetherill Park.
- "Tributary 1", which is the next longest channel, has a length of 1,380 metres (4,530 ft), where it starts from Potter Close in Wetherill Park to its merging with the Main Channel.
- The shortest channel, the "Rosford Channel", is 775 metres (2,543 ft) in length, which begins from Victoria Street, traverses Redfern Street to the east, ending at Hassall Street in Smithfield. This used to be a natural gully up until the early 1970s.
- Two detention basins are located within the Prospect Creek catchment, at Hassall Street and Rosford Park in its upper reaches. Known as the Hassall Street and Rosford Street detention basins, they are among the largest retarding basins within the catchment and the only two located directly on Prospect Creek. Both have the potential to significantly influence downstream flood conditions. The augmentation works involved raising the Hassall Street basin embankment by 1 m, increasing its storage capacity from 350,000 m³ to 600,000 m³, and closing two outlet culverts to reduce downstream flooding. At the Rosford Street Basin, one of the five outlet culverts was also closed to improve flood storage. The works, estimated at $340,000 in 1993, commenced in 2010.
- There is a minor detention basin in Emerson Street Reserve which is bordered by The Horsley Drive to the north and Emerson Street to the east, and a large pipe drainage network, which normally drains into one of the aforementioned channels or into Prospect Creek. Their construction was completed in the mid 1980s.

== River status ==
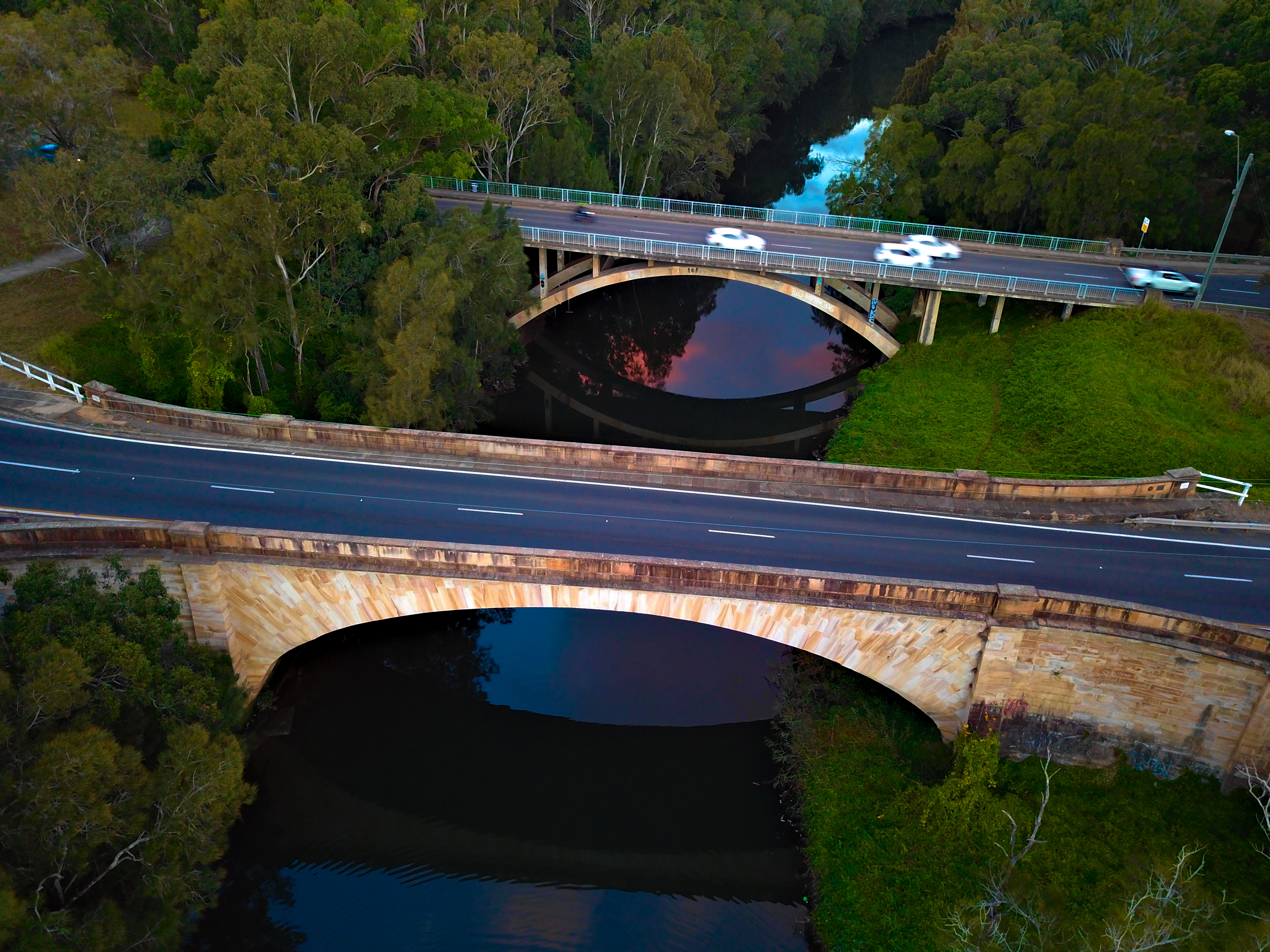
Lansdowne Bridge over what would have been the 'Lennox River'

The broad lower reaches of Prospect Creek have also been referred to locally as the Prospect River. Fairfield City Council historical material concerning the creek's popularity for boating during the 1920s refers to the waterway as the "Prospect River", while describing recreational boat trips along Prospect Creek.

In mid 2020, a proposal was submitted to upgrade a 6 kilometre (4 mi) stretch of Prospect Creek to a river status. The section of the creek proposed for designation as a river lies at the confluence of Orphan School Creek and Prospect Creek, extending from just west of Artie Street to Dhurawal Bay (Georges River) in the south. This stretch displays many river-like characteristics—being wide, deep, tidal, and navigable by watercraft, particularly near its mouth at Garrison Point, and has been referred to as a river by local residents for more than 180 years. In September 2020, this proposal went before the Geographical Names Board of NSW (GNB) after Community Advocate, Lachlan Hyde, with the support of local state MPs, pushed the New South Wales Government on the matter.

This stretch of the creek was going to be named Lennox River to honour Scottish-Australian stonemason David Lennox who designed and oversaw the construction of the Lansdowne Bridge which crosses this waterway. Guy Zangari (State Member for Fairfield), Tania Mihailuk (State Member for Bankstown), Nick Lalich (State Member for Cabramatta) and Wendy Lindsay (State Member for East Hills) all announced their support for the creek's river status in the NSW Parliament. Zangari stated, "I look forward to this stretch of Prospect Creek receiving an upgrade to river status and to [be] able to refer to it as the Lennox River, a name change that is overdue and eagerly anticipated by the residents of Fairfield."

Though despite all the support for its river status, the proposal was ultimately rejected by the NSW Geographical Names Board.
