= Heiden Park =

Park in Carramar, New South Wales, Australia

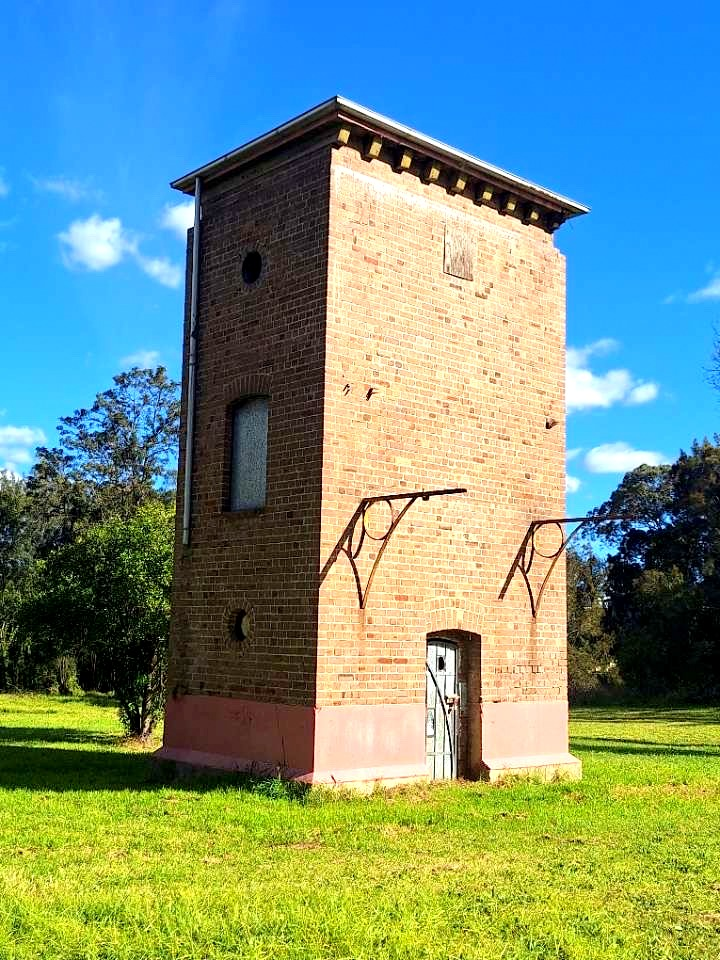
- The granary tower, constructed in the 1900s
- Interactive map of Heiden Park
- Type: Urban park, nature reserve
- Location: Carramar, New South Wales
- Nearest city: Sydney
- Coordinates: 33°52′44″S 150°57′35″E
- Area: 2.85 hectares (7.04 acres)
- Created: c. 1990
- Operator: Fairfield City Council
- Status: Open

Heiden Park (/ˈhaɪdən/ HY-dən) is a public park and heritage site in Carramar, New South Wales, Australia. Situated on the eastern bank of Prospect Creek, the park occupies part of the former Von Heiden Estate, the riverside residence of German-born piano manufacturer Carl Wilhelm Gunther von Heiden. The park preserves remnants of the estate's late Victorian and Edwardian ornamental gardens. In the early 20th century, the park's recreational area and the surrounding reaches of the creek were described as "the loveliest spot in the Southern Districts".

Following its formal acquisition in July 1951 for use as a retirement community, the park underwent extensive improvements, beginning with the opening of its first cottage for older residents in 1953 and continuing until the late 1980s. In 1990, the site was acquired by Fairfield City Council for conversion into an urban park. Following the sale of the flood-prone property, the retirement village was relocated to the former site of Fairfield District Hospital. The former von Heiden Gardens within the park are listed as a local heritage item under the Fairfield Local Environmental Plan 2013.

== History ==
=== Von Heiden estate (1919–1936) ===
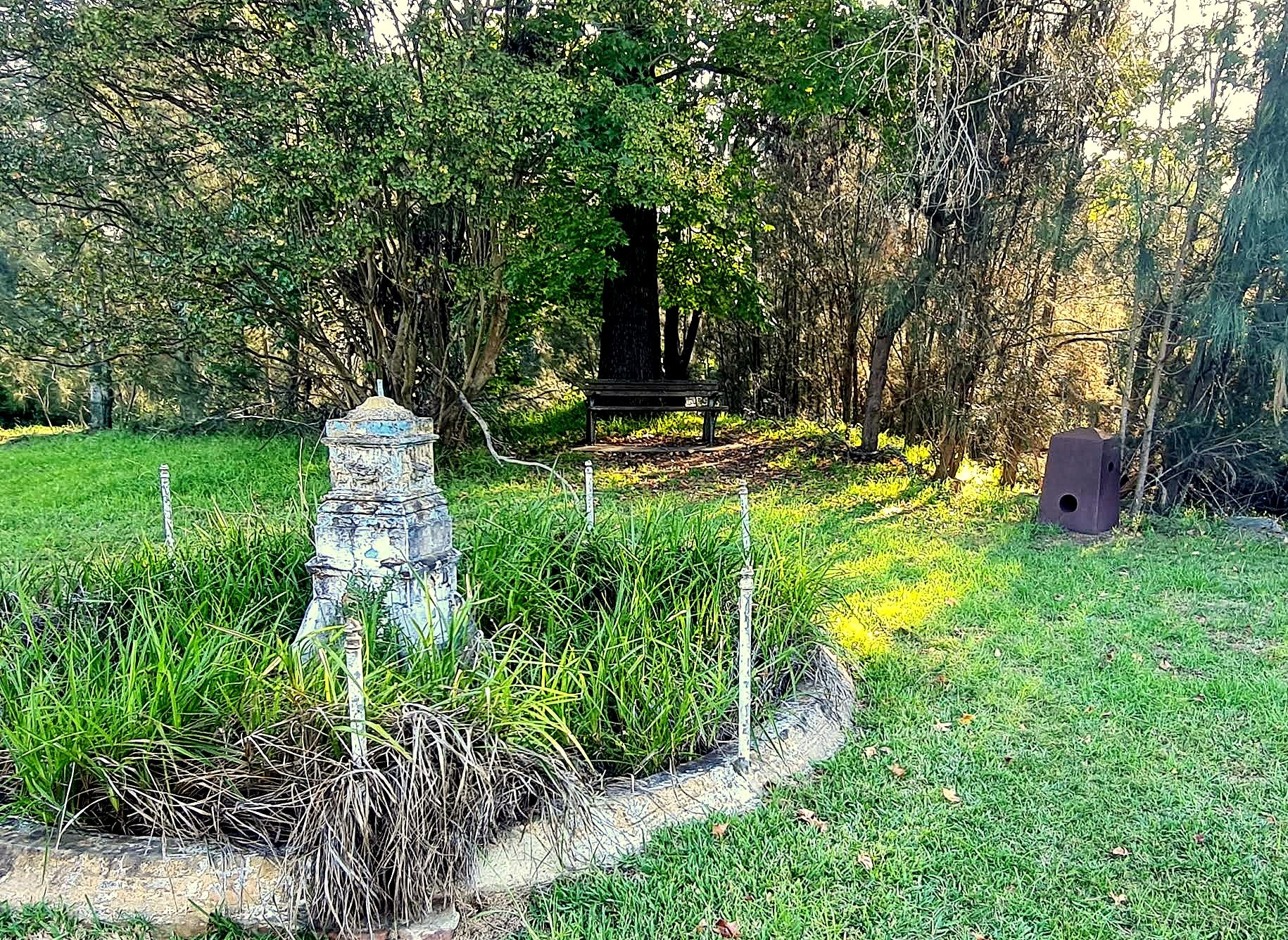
Surviving sandstone baluster base from the grand staircase of the former von Heiden estate

On 26 September 1919, Carl von Heiden purchased a 5.75-acre (2.33 ha) property at 1 Haughton Street from Francis Edward Rogers, who had acquired the land in 1903. Situated on one of the most scenic stretches of Prospect Creek, the estate featured a high-gabled residence with wide verandahs, surrounded by elaborate formal gardens in the style of the period. Balustraded staircases and terraced gardens descended to the creek, where fish ponds, ornamental fountains and statues of water bearers lined the grounds. The estate also included a grain store, a pigeon loft and a landing for the family's launch.

During the early twentieth century, the estate became a popular destination for boating, picnicking, fishing and swimming along Prospect Creek. Excursion boats regularly passed the property, whose gardens and buildings were regarded as highlights of the waterway, while the creek's clean waters at the time attracted both local residents and visitors.

By the early 1920s, Heiden Park had become one of Fairfield's principal private pleasure grounds, alongside nearby Wilga on the opposite bank of Prospect Creek, then commonly known as the "Georges River". In 1920, the proprietors, Carl von Heiden and William Latty, announced plans to expand the recreational facilities by constructing weather sheds and providing additional boats in response to increasing patronage, while Fairfield Municipal Council proposed improvements to the adjoining public reserve. During the 1920s, a suspension footbridge spanned Prospect Creek, linking the park with what is now Fairfield Park. It was the only pedestrian crossing between Vine Street, Fairfield, and the Carramar railway bridge.

=== Retirement village (1936–1989) ===
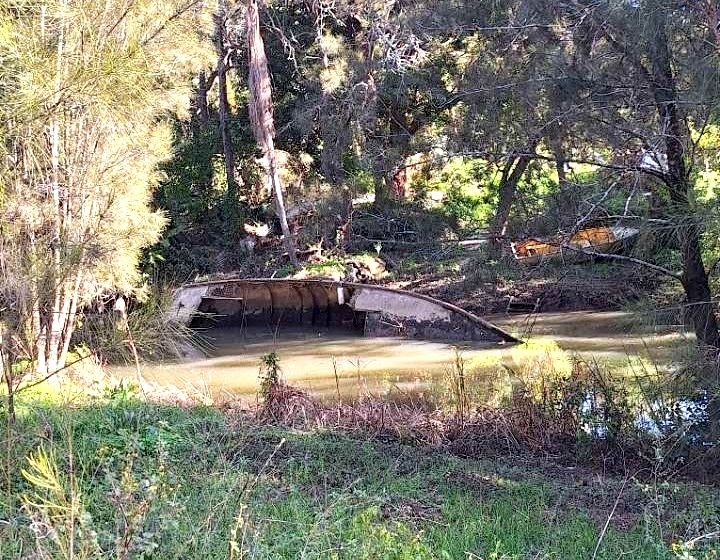
Following its abandonment in 1941, the site's shipwrecks became a popular subject of ruins photography.

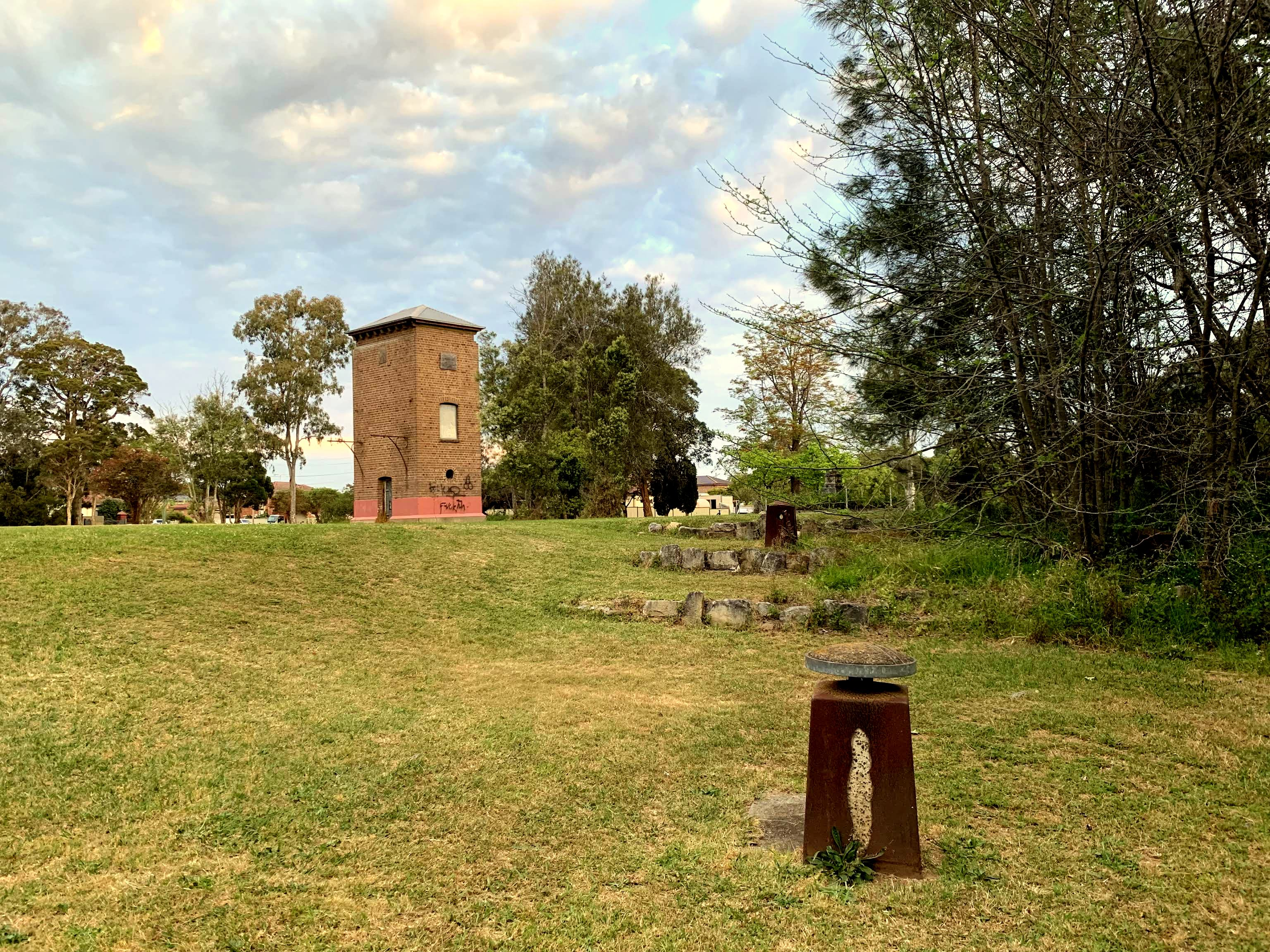
View across the park towards the granary tower

Following von Heiden's death in 1936, the estate was bequeathed to the Protestant Church by the widow of Carl von Heiden. In 1953, Heiden Park comprised a five-acre property that was almost entirely encircled by Prospect Creek, with wooded creek banks and a largely rural setting. A floodlight was installed that year to improve security. By the mid-1950s, the property was being converted into a nursing home. Construction of self-contained cottages was funded jointly by residents, the Commonwealth Government and the UPA, with later Commonwealth assistance covering half of the construction costs under the aged housing assistance scheme. The property also retained orchards, vineyards, vegetable gardens, poultry, dairy facilities and a pigeon loft, reflecting its largely self-sufficient character. In 1956, described the estate as an attractive setting for aged care, noting its spacious grounds and peaceful riverside surroundings.

Owing to its location on a flood-prone section of Prospect Creek, the cottages were raised above flood level during the 1960s. Council records indicate that residents were evacuated during flooding in December 1961, and further evacuations occurred during the major floods of 1986 and 1988 before residents returned after the cottages had been cleaned. A moulded square sandstone baluster base, now held in the Fairfield City Museum collection, survives from the grand staircase that once descended from the von Heiden residence to Prospect Creek. The staircase and a fountain surmounted by a statue of a boy remained in place until the 1980s.

In 1985, councillors inspected the Heiden Park complex and approved the submission of an application to acquire the Fairfield District Hospital site on the corner of The Horsley Drive and Mitchell Street, which was vacated in 1987 or 1988, for conversion into a UPA nursing home (called the Heiden Park Lodge).

=== Public park (1989–present) ===
In 1989, the UPA approved the voluntary sale of Heiden Park to Fairfield City Council for $800,000 following endorsement by its district councils and State Executive. The sale was prompted by the site's severe flood risk and the lack of available flood insurance. As a condition of the purchase, the council agreed to permanently commemorate the von Heiden name when the property became a park in 1990. In the late 1980s and early 1990s, the UPA relocated residents from the site of the present-day Heiden Park while continuing to seek government funding for Heiden Park Lodge, a hostel that opened to the west of the park in 1992. By 1991, all buildings on the former Heiden Park site had been demolished, with only the external staircase, fountain and tower remaining.

In 1996, a gazebo was installed in the park by Fairfield City Council, but it has since been removed. In 1996, Fairfield City Council commissioned a conservation plan for the site. By that time, the staircase and balustrades surrounding the fountain had been extensively vandalised and were recommended for demolition. The two lots adjoining Heiden Park appear to have been resumed by Fairfield City Council between 1998 and 2004. Despite efforts to maintain the site, many surviving ornamental features were lost through vandalism or neglect by 2006. Although the council proposed redeveloping the area as a park and bird sanctuary, the project did not proceed because funding was not secured.

== Features ==
Heiden Park contains several remnants of the former von Heiden estate, including a Federation-era brick tower believed to have served as a pigeon loft or grain store, sandstone terraces and retaining walls, the grand staircase leading to Prospect Creek, a former boat landing, and mature trees that are the last surviving elements of the estate's Late Victorian ornamental gardens. A fountain surmounted by a statue of a boy remained in situ until the 1980s. Its sandstone baluster base survives, with the date "1922" still visible. The park contains timber benches and it is bordered by native riparian bushland along Prospect Creek, including remnants of the endangered Coastal Swamp Oak Forest ecological community, which contribute to the area's biodiversity and natural character.

The park's main entrance is marked by three concrete pillars and a modern entrance gate. A shared walking and cycling path passes through Heiden Park before crossing Prospect Creek via a pedestrian bridge, which replaced an earlier suspension footbridge that stood on the site during the early twentieth century, to Fairfield Precinct Park. A solitary jacaranda tree, planted in the late 1980s or early 1990s, stands prominently within the park and has become a distinctive landscape feature. The Bland Oak in the adjoining Oakdene Park is a historic southern live oak estimated to be more than 180 years old, making it one of Sydney's oldest surviving introduced trees and one of the largest specimens in the region.

== See also ==
- Carramar, New South Wales
- Fairfield Park Precinct
