= Fairfield Park =

Fairfield Park may refer to:

- Fairfield Park Precinct, or Fairfield Park, an urban park in western Sydney, Australia
- Fairfield, Bedfordshire, England, a village that was originally known as Fairfield Park
- Fairfield railway station, Melbourne, Australia, originally called Fairfield Park railway station
