= Burns Creek (Sydney) =

Creek in Western Sydney, New South Wales, Australia

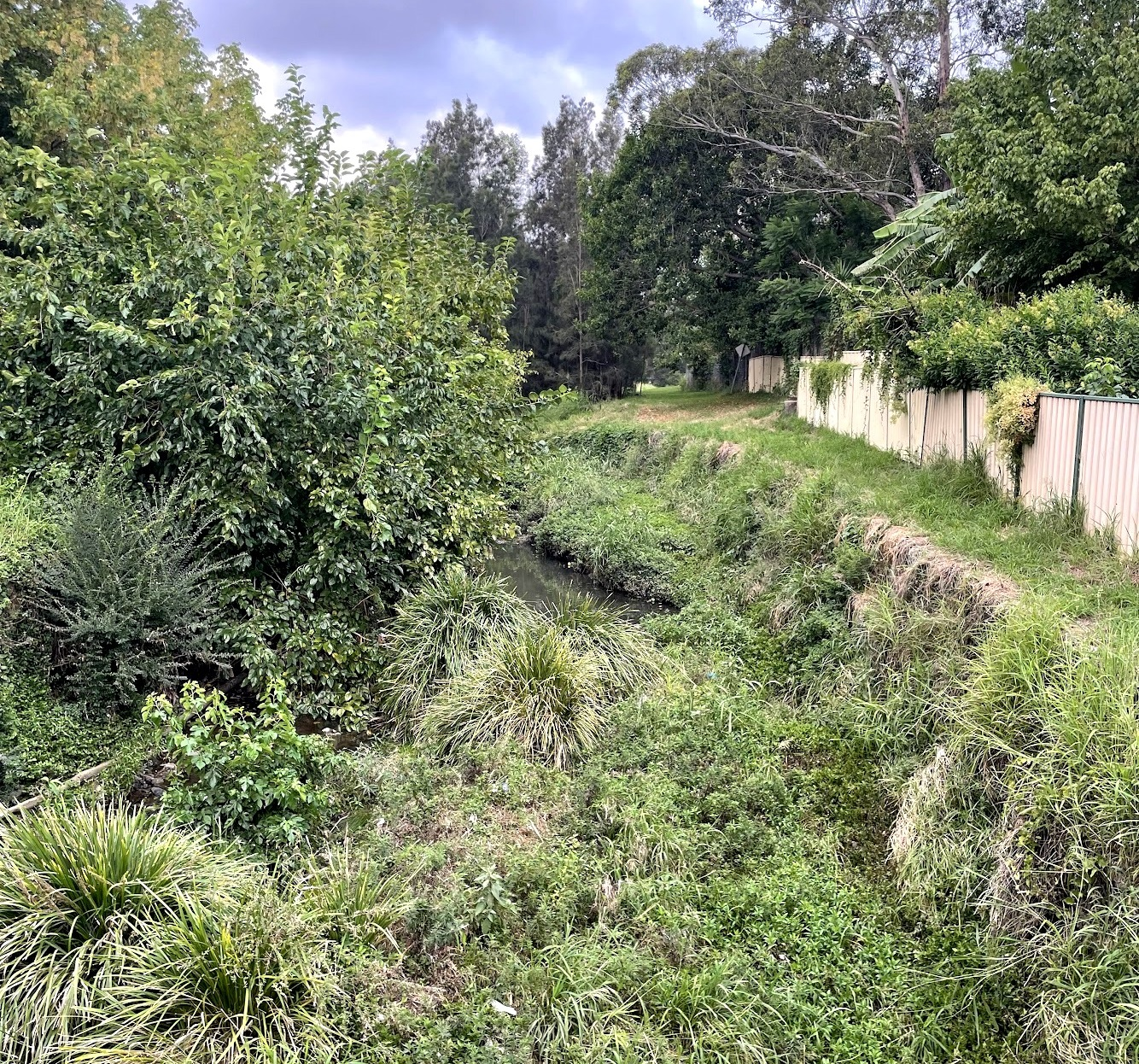
- The creek just near The Horsley Drive in Fairfield East

Location
- Country: Australia
- State: New South Wales
- Region: Sydney Basin (IBRA), Greater Western Sydney
- LGAs: Fairfield

Physical characteristics
- Source: Blackford Park
  - location: Tangerine Street, Fairfield East
  - elevation: 12 m (39 ft)
- Mouth
  - location: Prospect Creek
  - coordinates: Cockburn Crescent Reserve, Fairfield East
- Length: 4.6 km (2.9 mi)
- Width
  - average: 4 m (13 ft)
- Depth
  - minimum: 50 cm (20 in)
  - maximum: 1 m (3.3 ft)

Basin features
- River system: Sydney Basin catchment
- Tributaries
  - right: Stimsons Creek
- Dam / Reservoir: Prospect Reservoir

Burns Creek is a small brook in south-western Sydney that is a tributary of Prospect Creek. It is located predominantly in the suburb of Fairfield East in the City of Fairfield, New South Wales, Australia. Short in length, the creek flows from west to east, where it starts as a confluence from the Prospect Creek just below The Horsley Drive (near Patrician Brothers' College, Fairfield) and flows to the eastern portion of Tangerine Street, before becoming a drain in Villawood to the southeast.

The rivulet has an even smaller tributary which is the concrete-walled Stimsons Creek to the north.

== Geography ==
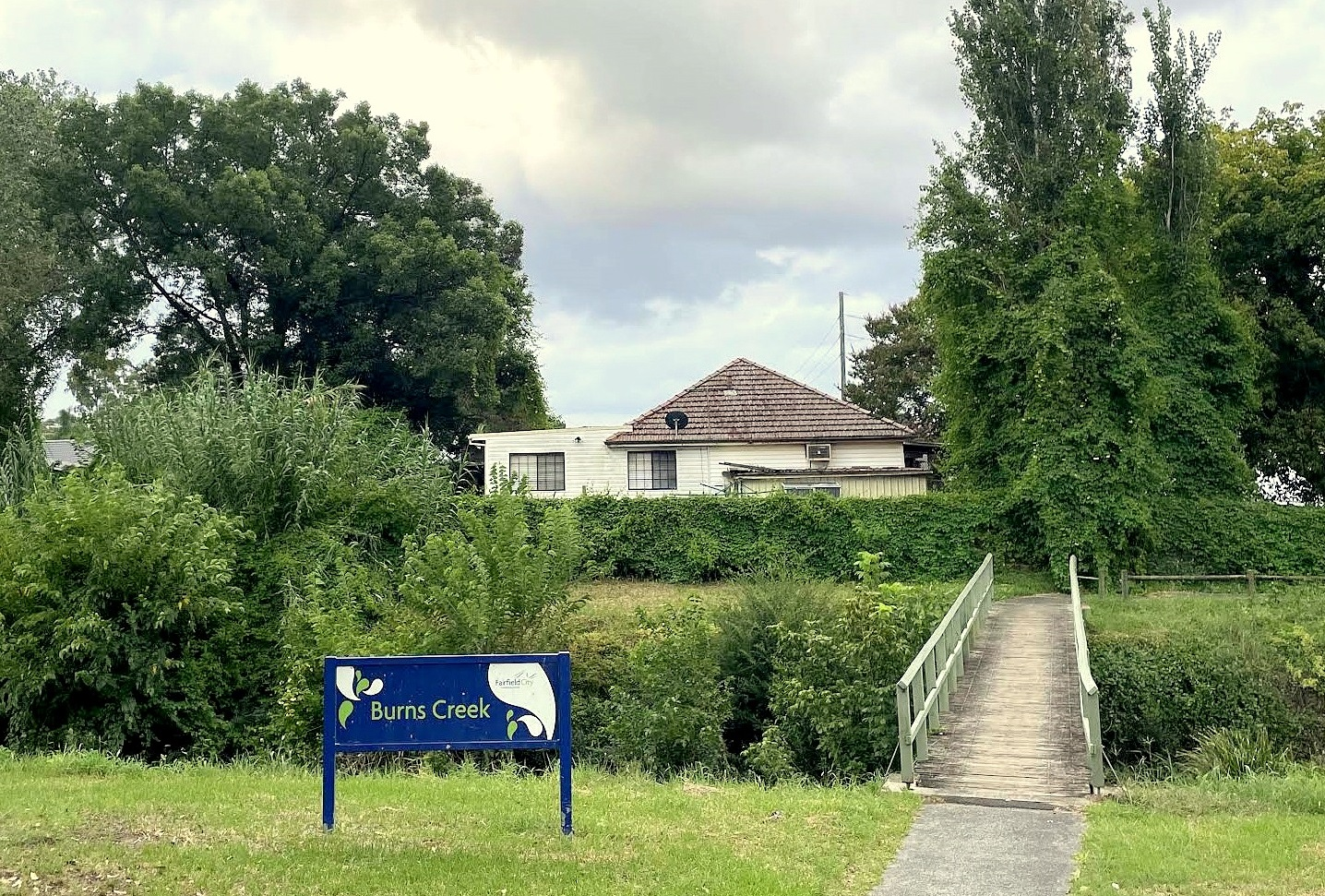
Footbridge with the creek's signboard in display

Burns Creek drains a catchment area of 13.5 square kilometres (5.2 mi^{2}) into Prospect Creek. Its catchment area includes portions of the local government areas of Canterbury-Bankstown, Fairfield and Cumberland local government areas. The largest area of catchment is residential land use (approximately 50%), followed by industrial land use, where open space only accounts for about 15% of the catchment. Flooding in the creek has generally concurred with the flooding within the extensive Prospect Creek catchment.

The boundaries of nearby residential and commercial zones are usually situated at the top of the bank, or are at least located up to 10 metres (33 ft). A grassy high flowing bypass floodway was established across the curve where the creek meets the concrete-walled Stimsons Creek. Road bridges are found at Normanby Street and Mandarin Street, both being span bridges, a further road bridge at The Horsley Drive, which features two rows of piers, and a footbridge at Campbell Street (that leads to Victory Street).

Upstream of Woodville Road, the waterway becomes a concrete-walled rectangular channel, which partitions into multiple tributaries. Stimson Creek and Barrass Drain are Burns Creek's two sub-catchments. The creek's riparian strip features recreational areas such as Blackford Park, Cockburn Crescent Reserve, Landon Street Reserve and Hanson Reserve. During early European colonisation, Burns Creek and many other creeks in the Fairfield area were a series of freshwater ponds or gullies, rather than continuously streaming waterbodies.

=== Course ===
Burns Creek is a suburban rivulet that is 4.6 km (2.9 mi) in length, with 1.5 kilometres (0.93 mi) of it being presented as a concrete-lined perennial waterway within a vegetated environment downstream (north) of Tangerine Street. The rest of the creek is intermittent, flowing as a subterranean waterway in some areas and forming a gully in others. It is known as Villawood Drain particularly upstream (south of Woodville Road).

It normally flows from south-east to north-west and it can be regarded as Prospect Creek's eastern fork. Near Tangerine Street, the creek's banks become moderately bushy, and it is more densely vegetated around its confluence with Stimsons Creek and also downstream of The Horsley Drive, with tree species generally being those found in the Coastal Swamp Oak Forest and River-flat eucalypt forest biomes, such as Casuarina glauca.

== Stimsons Creek ==
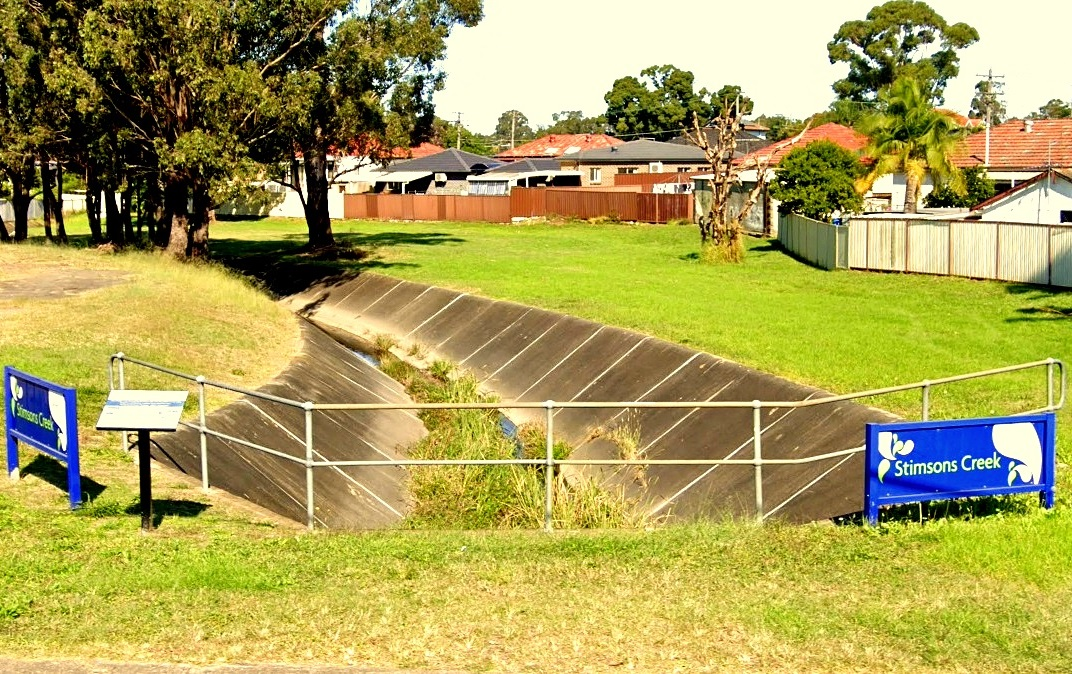
Stimsons Creek viewed from Fairfield Street

The concrete-lined, earthen, north–south orientated, channel Stimsons Creek joins Burns Creek upstream of The Horsley Drive, just south of Fairfield Street and the Cumberland Line, and is just around 450 metres (1,480 ft) in length. Stimsons Creek becomes subterranean just below Tangerine Street (as it heads south-east).

The creek has a catchment of 2.85 kilometres (1.77 mi) and a length of 3.8 kilometres (2.4 mi), most of it being subterranean, where it fluctuates from pipeline releasing into an open waterway to a brief concrete lined section, and a meandering vegetated division.

== Hydrology ==
An XP-RAFTS hydrologic model was prepared of the Burns Creek catchment to draw flow hydrographs from the study subcatchments for flood events. The model was established as a 1D stream network embedded in a 2D domain to correctly embody the in-channel hydraulics and each two-dimensional flow patterns on the floodplain, especially on the lower ends of the creek where intricate interaction with Prospect Creek floodwaters is anticipated. The model extends from upstream of the Fairfield LGA boundary near Woodville Road and on Stimsons Creek near the railway line.

The high flood risk areas may extend onto the overbank sections in the proximity of Malta Street and Montrose Avenue, as well as areas of Fairfield Street and Tangerine Street. The TUFLOW model showed that floodwaters erupt of the creek upstream of Woodville Road and surge on surface during events a few times in the span of 20 years. In the 100 year ARI event, the floodplain is up to 300 metres (980 ft) wide on the creek, about downstream of Woodville Road. Overall, a calculated total of 702 lots surrounding the creek can be affected by high flooding. A number of box culverts replace the waterway between Tangerine Street and Woodville Road. The creek features two detention basins; Knight Park Basin and Springfield Park Basin. There is also a water pipe crossing in the vicinity.

== See also ==
- Orphan School Creek (Fairfield)
- Prospect Creek
- Georges River
