= Carramar, New South Wales =

Carramar
- Suburb
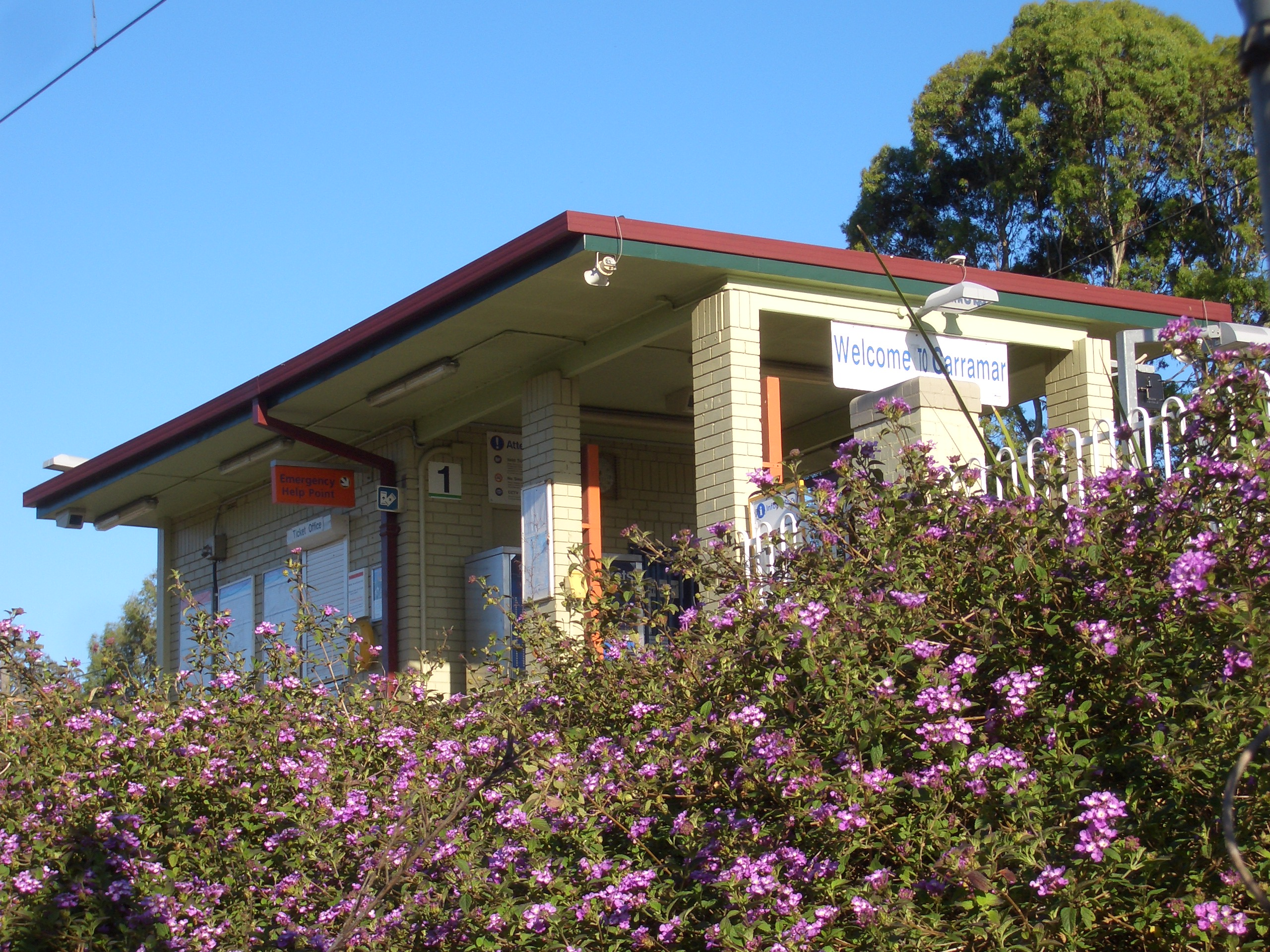
- Carramar Railway Station

- Interactive map of Carramar
- Country: Australia
- State: New South Wales
- City: Sydney
- LGA: City of Fairfield
- Location: 30 km (19 mi) west of Sydney CBD
- Established: 1926

Government
  - State electorate: Fairfield
  - Federal divisions: Blaxland; Fowler
- Elevation: 11 m (36 ft)

Population
  - Total: 3,475 (2021 census)
- Postcode: 2163
Suburbs around Carramar
Fairfield	Fairfield	Fairfield East
Fairfield	Carramar	Villawood
Canley Vale	Lansvale	Lansdowne

Carramar is a suburb of Sydney, in the state of New South Wales, Australia. Carramar is located 30 kilometres west of the Sydney central business district, in the local government area of the City of Fairfield and is part of the South Western Sydney region.

== History ==
Carramar's name comes from an aboriginal word meaning "shade of trees". The first land grant in the area was made by Governor King in 1803. One of Sydney's oldest trees, the Bland Oak, was planted in the suburb in the 1830s by William Bland. When the railway station opened here in 1924, it was called South Fairfield. However, the area had been known as Carramar since at least the 1850s and the name of the station was changed to Carramar in 1926. A post office was opened the following year as the local population began to swell.

The land east of what is now Haughton Street near Prospect Creek was once the home of pioneering German migrant and piano maker, Carl Wilhlem Gunther von Heiden. In the mid-1900s, Heiden's property, which was known as the Von Heiden Estate, was used for recreational boating opposite at Latty's Boatshed on Prospect Creek. The von Heiden house featured formal gardens decorated in the fashion of the Edwardian era. In the early 1920s, the Lansdowne Bridge area, now the site of Lansdowne Bridge Reserve and Rashay's restaurant, became a popular recreation spot known as the Garden of Eden Picnic Grounds, where visitors could hire boats and purchase refreshments.

Due to rapid population growth in the area after World War 2, Fairfield District Hospital was opened on The Horsley Drive at Mitchell Street in Fairfield in September 1956 until it was relocated in 1988 to Wetherill Park. In 1955 a retirement village was built on the Von Heiden Estate, though due to recurring flooding and high tides the homes were demolished in the late 1980s, and the village was moved to a new site. Fairfield City Council then designated part of the former estate on the creek's banks as a nature reserve called Heiden Park, adjoining Fairfield Park to the north, with minor visible indication of the Von Heidon Estate.

== Demographics ==
According to the 2021 census of population, there were 3,475 residents in Carramar. 36.8% of people were born in Australia. The most common other countries of birth were Vietnam 18.0%, China (excludes SARs and Taiwan) 3.7%, Iraq 3.5%, Lebanon 2.6% and Philippines 2.1%. 24.4% of people only spoke English at home. Other languages spoken at home included Vietnamese 21.5%, Arabic 12.2%, Cantonese 3.4%, Mandarin 3.0% and Spanish 2.7%. The most common religious groups were Catholic 20.1%, Islam 16.7%, Buddhism 16.0%, No Religion 15.9% and Not stated 10.8%. Christianity was the largest religious group reported overall (42.5%).

== Schools ==
Carramar Public School features an infants and primary school, although the school technically falls within the suburb of Villawood.

== Commercial areas and transport ==
Carramar has a small commercial shopping centre, and a small industrial area. The suburb also features a Rashay's, which is a family restaurant and café. Carramar railway station is on the Main Southern railway line. Ruby Manor, situated in Ruby Street, is a modern apartment block that is a nursing home and an aged care facility that has over 90 beds and 60 rooms.

== Recreational areas ==
The area is traversed by Prospect Creek, whose riparian corridor contains several parks and nature reserves, including Fairfield Park Precinct on the suburb's northern outskirts, the adjoining Heiden Park, Oakdene Park (home to the Bland Oak), Artir Street Reserve, Waterside Crescent Reserve, Carramar Riverside Reserve, Sandal Crescent Reserve, Carrawood Park (which includes a sports field), and Lansdowne Bridge Reserve, which features the David Lennox Walk alongside the creek and the heritage-listed Lansdowne Bridge.

== Economy ==
Residents have referred to Carramar as "the forgotten suburb" due to it having damaged footpaths, scarce street lighting and no disabled access for its train station. To improve the suburb, Fairfield City Council had planned in 2018 to establish a 3,200m^{2} park in between Carramar and Villawood.

== Notable people ==
- Maria Tran – actress, filmmaker
