= Bland Oak =

Historic Southern live oak in Carramar, New South Wales, Australia

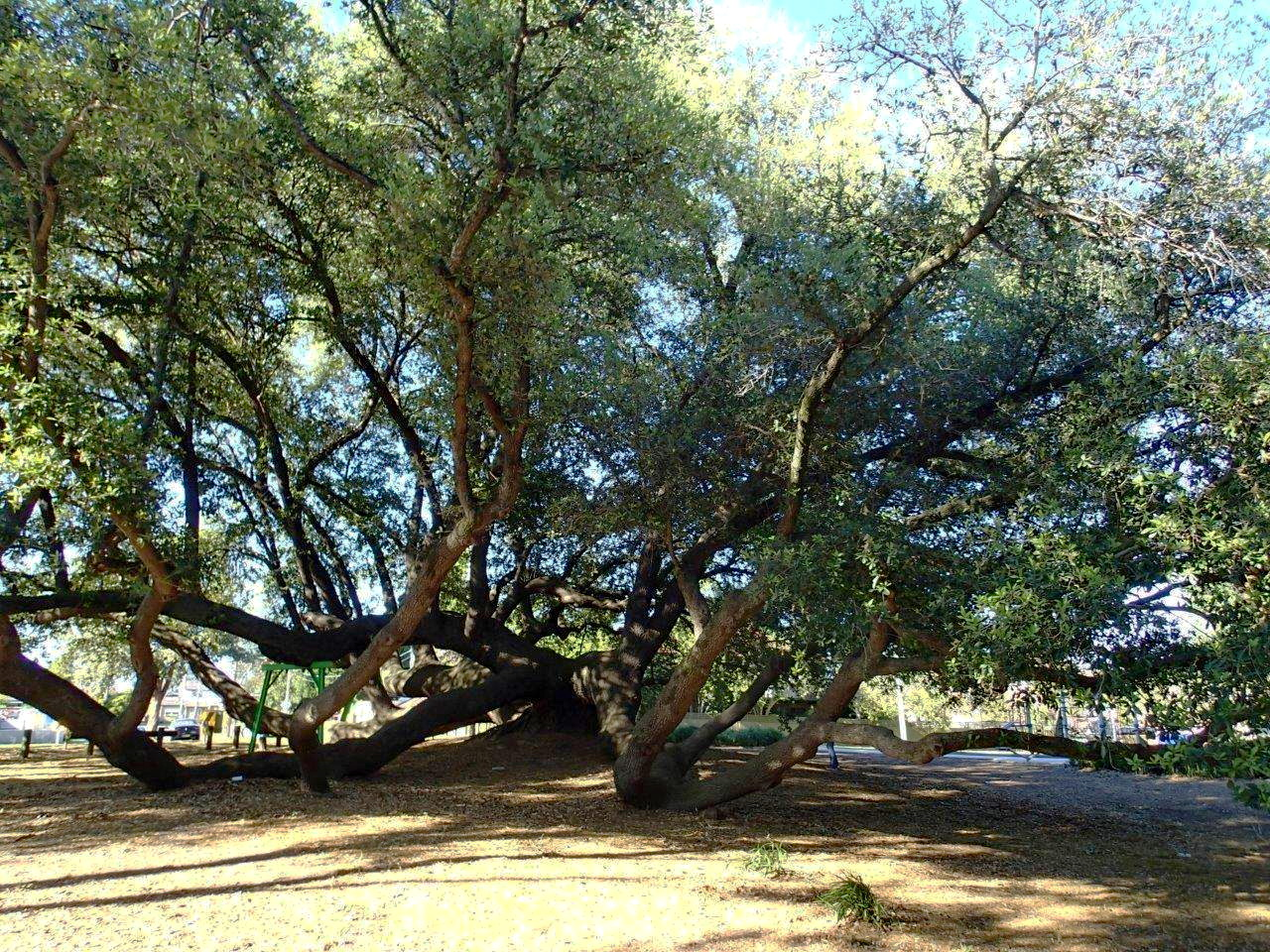
- The oak tree in 2016
- Interactive map of Bland Oak
- Species: Live oak (Quercus virginiana)
- Location: Carramar, New South Wales, Sydney, Australia
- Coordinates: 33.8797°S 150.9617°E
- Date seeded: 1842
- Custodian: William Bland (planter); Fairfield City Council

The Bland Oak, or Bland's Oak Tree, is a historic southern live oak situated in Carramar, Greater Western Sydney, New South Wales, Australia, that is approximately over 180 years old, making it one of Sydney's oldest living introduced trees and also one of the largest in the region. A local significance and a historic symbol of Fairfield City Council, the oak tree is included on Fairfield City's coat of arms.

== Description ==
Planted by former convict, politician, farmer and inventor William Bland in 1842, the Bland Oak was the largest tree in Australia until it split in two parts after a storm early on New Year Day 1941. Its dissipated wood was assembled and carved into the Mayoral chair, which is currently housed at Fairfield City Museum & Gallery in Smithfield. Despite the incident, the oak tree still remains to be the largest of its kind in Sydney, with its interminably sprawling crowns and prominent canopy, providing decent shade.

Located in the suburb of Carramar in Oakdene Park, which lies in Bland Street, the tree is around 13 metres (43 ft) tall and has a width of more than 30 metres (98 ft).

== Significance ==
Fairfield mayor Frank Carbone proposed for the tree to be recognised on a national level after the council accepted its local importance in the Local Environmental Plan in 2013. Fairfield Council will apply to the National Trust of Australia to have the tree listed on the National Register of Significant Trees, which documents and preserves more than 2000 significant trees.

According to Carbone, “This lonely tree standing in the middle of our city is significant for its age, rarity and unique shape telling a story of our heritage”. Further, he stated “It represents a significant part of our local heritage and is a historic symbol of our city, standing as a landmark beside Prospect Creek”.

Acorns from the tree were collected in March 2020 and planted to grow about 10 new "Bland Oaks" throughout the city.

== Gallery ==
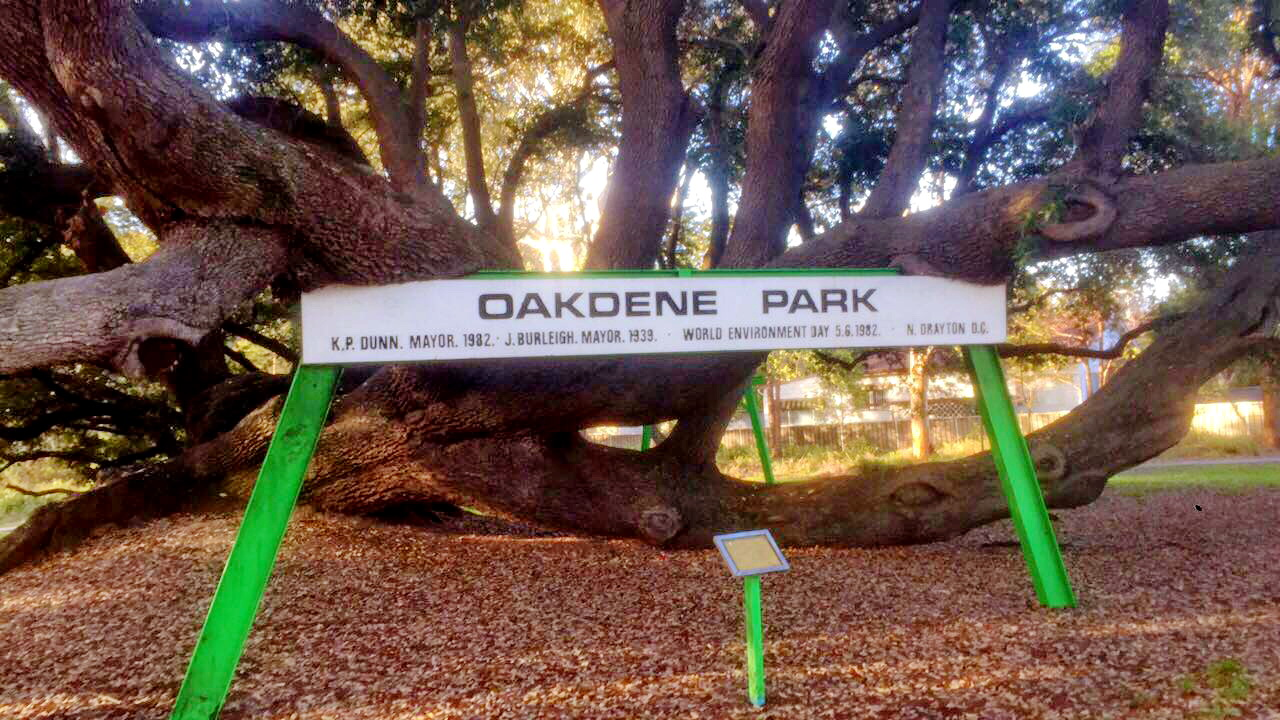
Oakdene Park entrance sign with tree in background

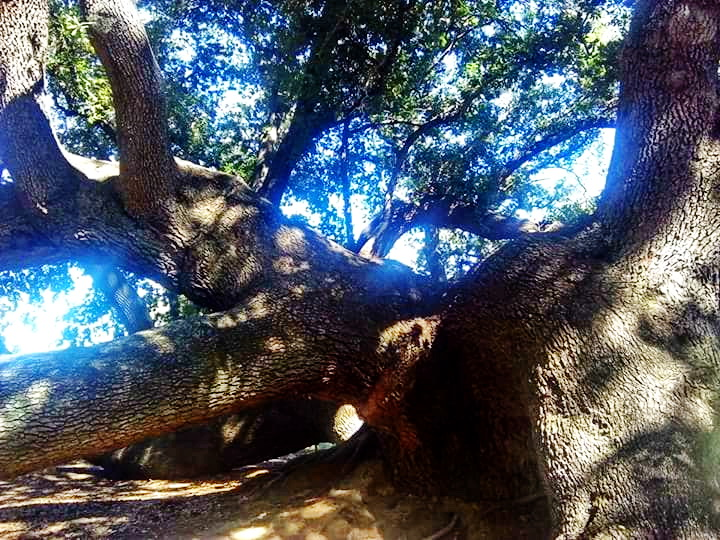
The tree up close

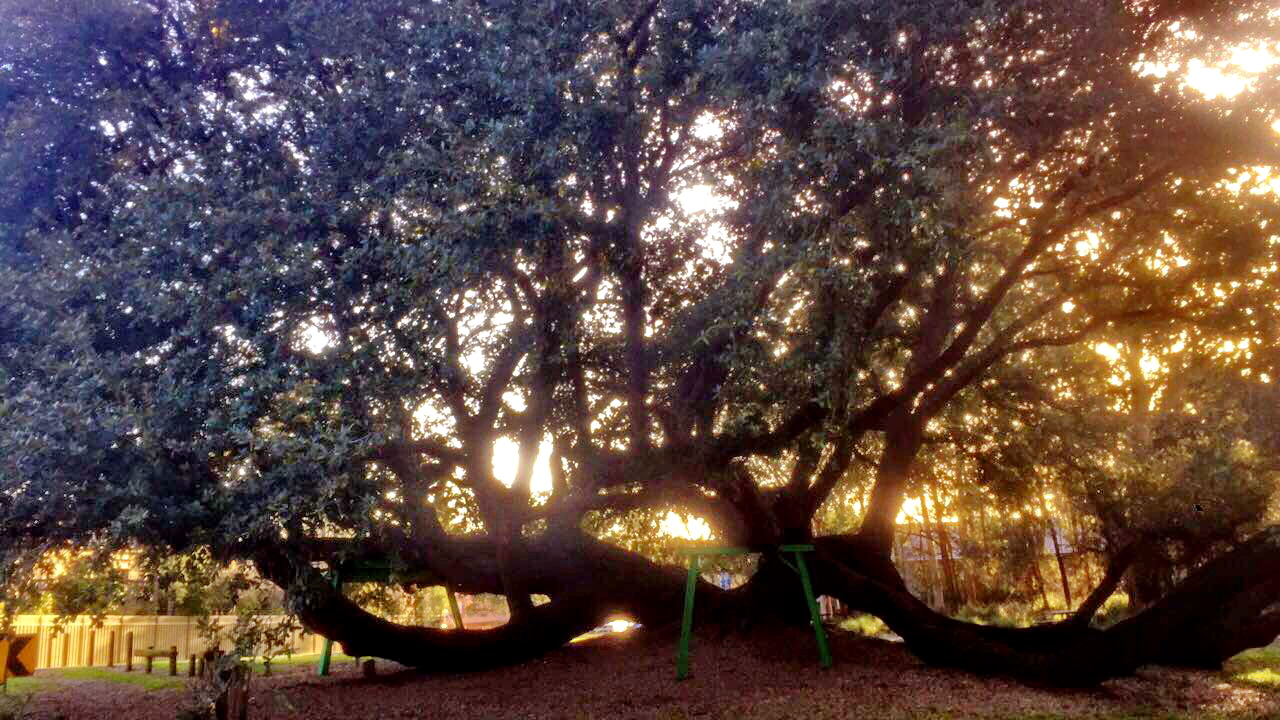
Whole view of tree at dusk

== See also ==
- Site of Ficus superba var. henneana tree, a historical tree in Sydney CBD
- List of individual trees
- Fairfield Park Precinct, a large park just to the north of the tree
- Heiden Park, a park adjoining Oakdene Park to the west
