= Fairfield Hospital (Sydney) =

- South Western Sydney Local Health District
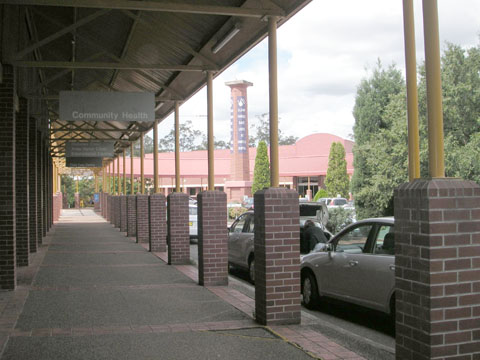

Geography
- Location: Prairiewood, NSW, Australia
- Coordinates: 33°51′35″S 150°54′15″E

Organisation
- Care system: Public Medicare (AU)
- Type: District General

Services
- Emergency department: Yes
- Beds: 200

Helipads
- Helipad: (ICAO: YFHO)
Number	Length		Surface
Number	ft	m	Surface
1			grass

History
- Founded: 1988
- Opened: 1988

Links
- Website: Official Website
- Lists: Hospitals in Australia

Fairfield Hospital is a general hospital located in Prairiewood, in Western Sydney, New South Wales, Australia. Located in the City of Fairfield, it has about 200 beds and provides general medical, physiotherapy, general surgical, obstetric, paediatric, emergency, ambulatory care, and drug health services. The hospital opened at its current location in Prairiewood in 1988, after relocating from the old site on The Horsley Drive in Fairfield.

== History ==
In May 1954, the Hospitals Commission accepted the tender of James Samson and Co. for the construction of the prefabricated buildings that would form Fairfield District Hospital in what is now Carramar. Built at a cost of £750,000, the hospital comprised 100 general beds and 27 maternity beds. Located at the corner of The Horsley Drive and Mitchell Street, it was intended as a temporary facility pending the construction of a permanent hospital. The hospital was officially opened on 15 September 1956 by the New South Wales Minister for Health, W. F. Sheahan.

During the 1970s and 1980s, growing demand for health services, driven by rapid residential development in the Fairfield district, prompted calls for a larger replacement hospital. Fairfield District Hospital was decommissioned in 1987 following the completion of the new hospital at Prairiewood, which opened in 1988. The former hospital buildings were demolished in 1990.

== Services ==
In addition to its district hospital level role, Fairfield Hospital hosts two major specialist units. It hosts the major specialist hand surgery unit for South Western Sydney. It is also the major elective orthopaedic surgery site for the area, and is the host of the Whitlam Joint Replacement Centre. Patients from Fairfield can also be transferred to Liverpool Hospital, which is the second largest hospital in the state with 900+ beds and significantly larger surgical & life support services available.

An onsite academic unit affiliated with UNSW (University of New South Wales) Medicine provides general practice services, medical education and training, and conducts primary care, health services and health informatics research.

== See also ==
- List of hospitals in Australia
- Liverpool Hospital
