= Salt tide =

Phenomenon in rivers

Salt tide is a phenomenon in which the lower course of a river, with its low altitude with respect to the sea level, becomes salty when the discharge of the river is low during the dry season, usually worsened by the result of astronomical high tide.

The lower course Xijiang (West River) in Guangdong, China was periodically affected and has been widely reported since 2004, for bringing shortage of fresh water supply to the western part of the Pearl River Delta. The salinity level of tap water at Zhuhai was reported to be as high as 800 mg per litre in late February 2006, more than 3 times higher than the World Health Organization standard of 250 mg.
