= Fairfield Park Precinct =

Urban park in Sydney, Australia

Fairfield Park
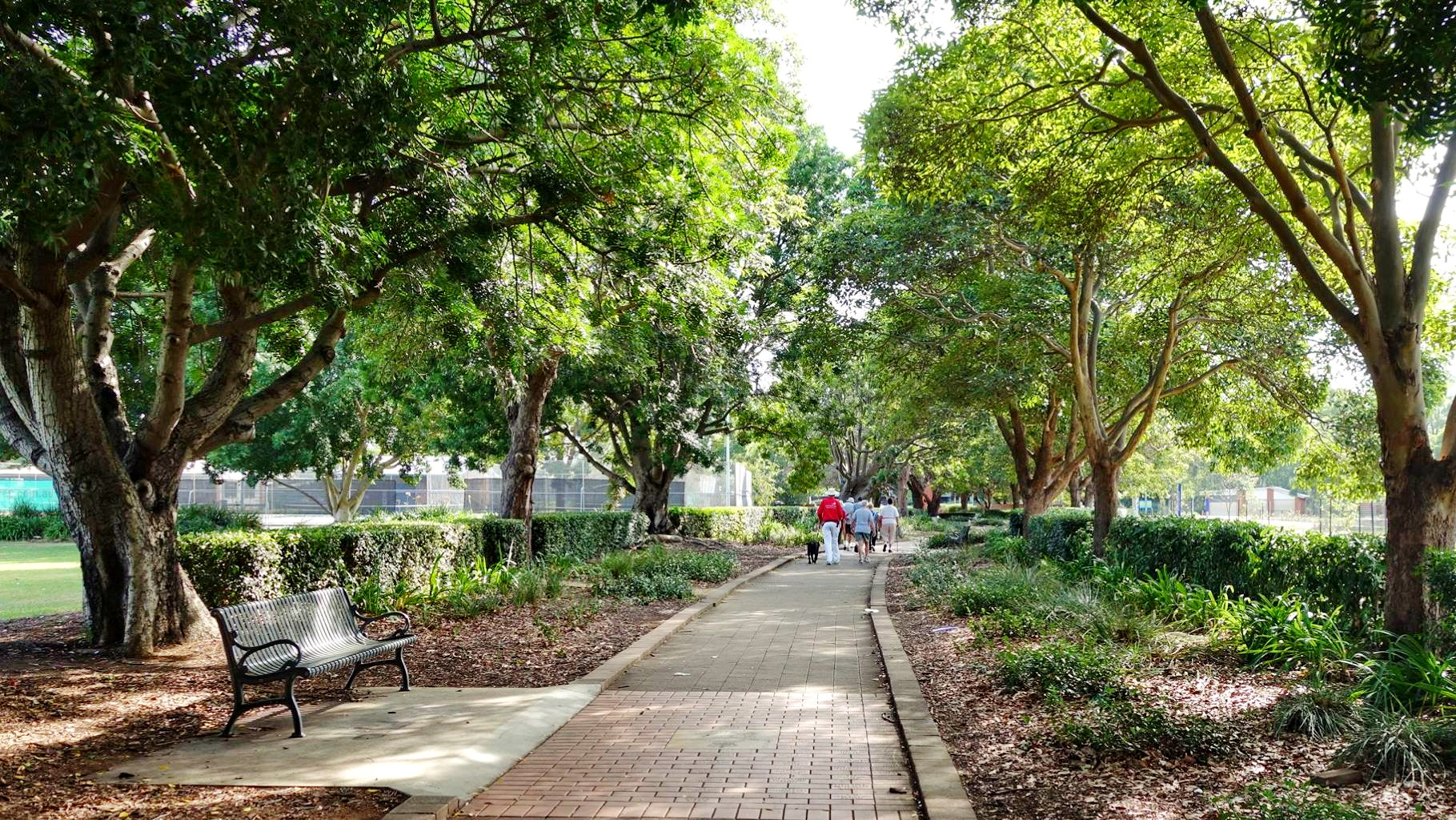
- Fairfield Park Honour Avenue

- Location within New South Wales
- Type: Urban park, sports ground, nature reserve
- Location: Fairfield
- Coordinates: 33°52′28″S 150°57′34″E
- Area: 18 hectares (44.48 acres)
- Operator: Fairfield City Council
- Status: Open all year

Fairfield Park Precinct, also called Fairfield Park and Fairfield Parklands and Leisure Centre, is an urban park situated in the western suburbs of Sydney, New South Wales, Australia. Situated to the south of Fairfield CBD, the park contains an open grassland, bushland, picnic spots, playgrounds, indoor and outdoor sport facilities, and recreational areas within the vicinity of native plants, such as eucalyptus trees.

== Facilities ==
The park contains several recreation and sporting attractions such as Fairfield Bowling Club, tennis courts, a 7,500 square metre obstacle course with 3 metre high tree top walk, and a recently constructed nature playground, Fairfield Adventure Park, a large playground for older children and teens, which was opened in April 2015. Costing $1.4 million, the playground features an 11 metre high climbing net, a sky bridge and three-slide combination, one of the tallest of its type in the country, and a 33 metre long double flying fox.

The park also features Fairfield Youth and Community Centre, a large hall which opened in October 2015, that contains basketball courts, trampolines, a rock climbing wall, program rooms and extra parking spaces. Adjacent is the Fairfield Leisure Centre, an aquatic centre, which has two swimming pools (indoor and outdoor), a mini-water park, a squash court and a gym.

== Geography ==
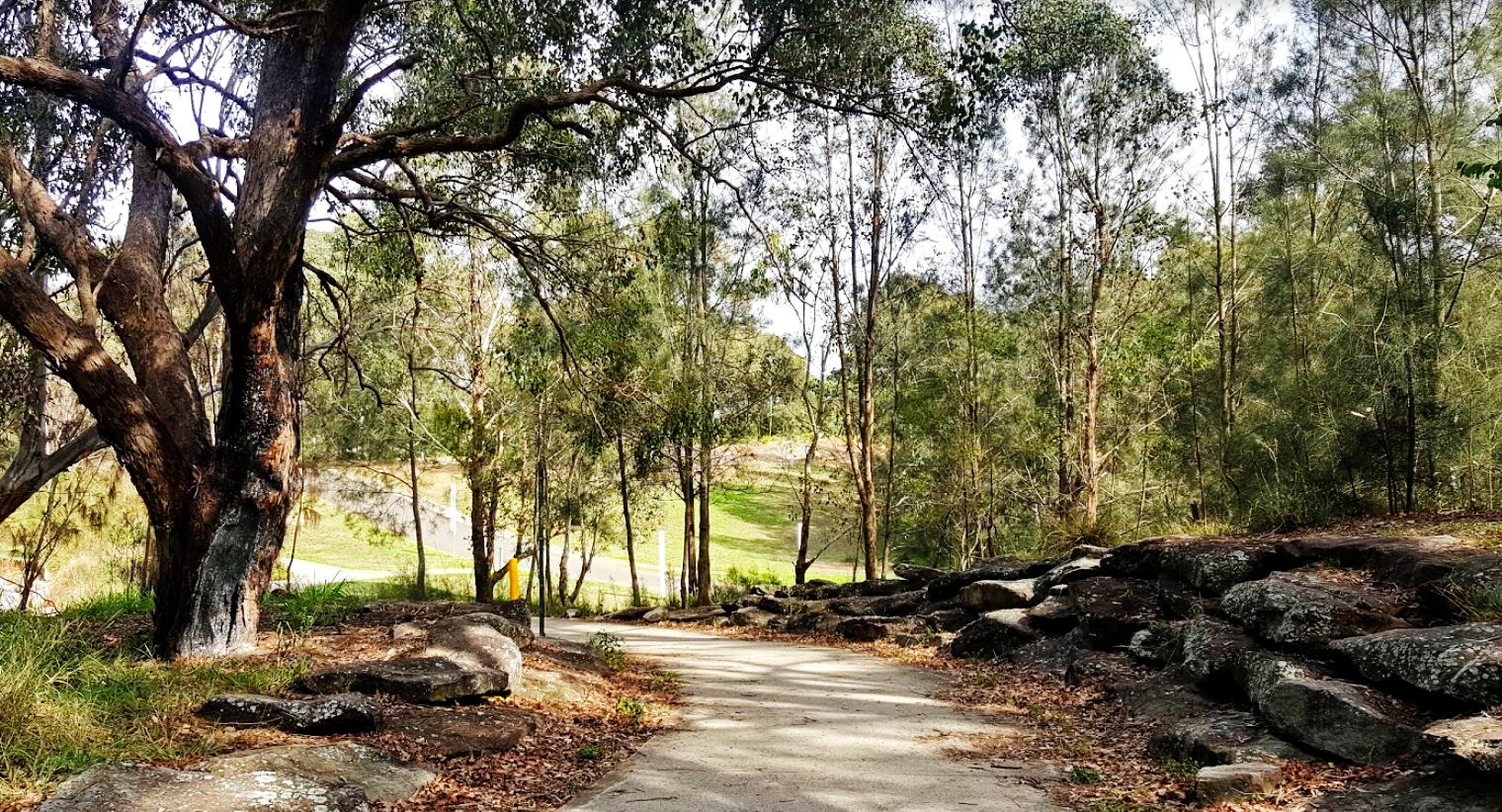
The walkway within the native bushland

Indigenous trees and shrubs are plenteous in the park, which are a remnant of the Cumberland Plain Woodland and Cooks River/Castlereagh Ironbark ecological community, with vegetation species that include Melaleuca decora, Eucalyptus amplifolia, Eucalyptus moluccana, Eucalyptus baueriana, Eucalyptus fibrosa, Eucalyptus teriticornis, angophora floribunda, Casuarina glauca, Callistemon viminalis, Ficus microcarpa, Camphor laurel, Bursaria spinosa, Indigofera australis and Eucalyptus bosistoana, most of which have large canopies that provide shade for visitors.

Prospect Creek winds on the eastern end of the park and there is a pedestrian bridge above it, providing views over the creek. The vegetation that surrounds the reserve's creekline is within the riparian zone. The fauna commonly includes Australian birds, such as the Australian raven, Australian magpie and the galah.

All in all being 18 hectares (44.48 acres) in size, the park proper (which excludes the area south of Prospect Creek, around Orphan School Creek) is around 12 hectares (29.65 acres) in size.

== Transport ==
The park is situated on Vine Street and is only a 10-minute walk from Fairfield railway station. It contains a number of walkways and cycleways, namely near Prospect Creek, which link it to Carramar to the south and Fairfield East to the east. The Horsley Drive is a major arterial road on the east side of the parkland. There is also an entry to the park from Haughton Street in Carramar to the south, via a walk/cycleway, adjoining Heiden Park to the west.

== Heritage ==
Honour Avenue, situated on the entrance of Fairfield Park, is a memorial gateway that commemorates Australia's involvement in various 20th century wars. It was built in honour of the Fairfield residents who served in the World Wars and it includes the names of World War II personnel. Its connecting metal arch displays the words "1939 Honour Avenue 1945". The avenue therein contains large brush boxes and Hill's weeping figs on both sides and public seating.

== Crime ==
In February 2013, a body of a young man, a homicide victim, was located in the park's oval at around 4am by police and paramedics. In April 2014, two 16 year old girls who skipped school were raped by three men in broad daylight within the park grounds.

== Gallery ==
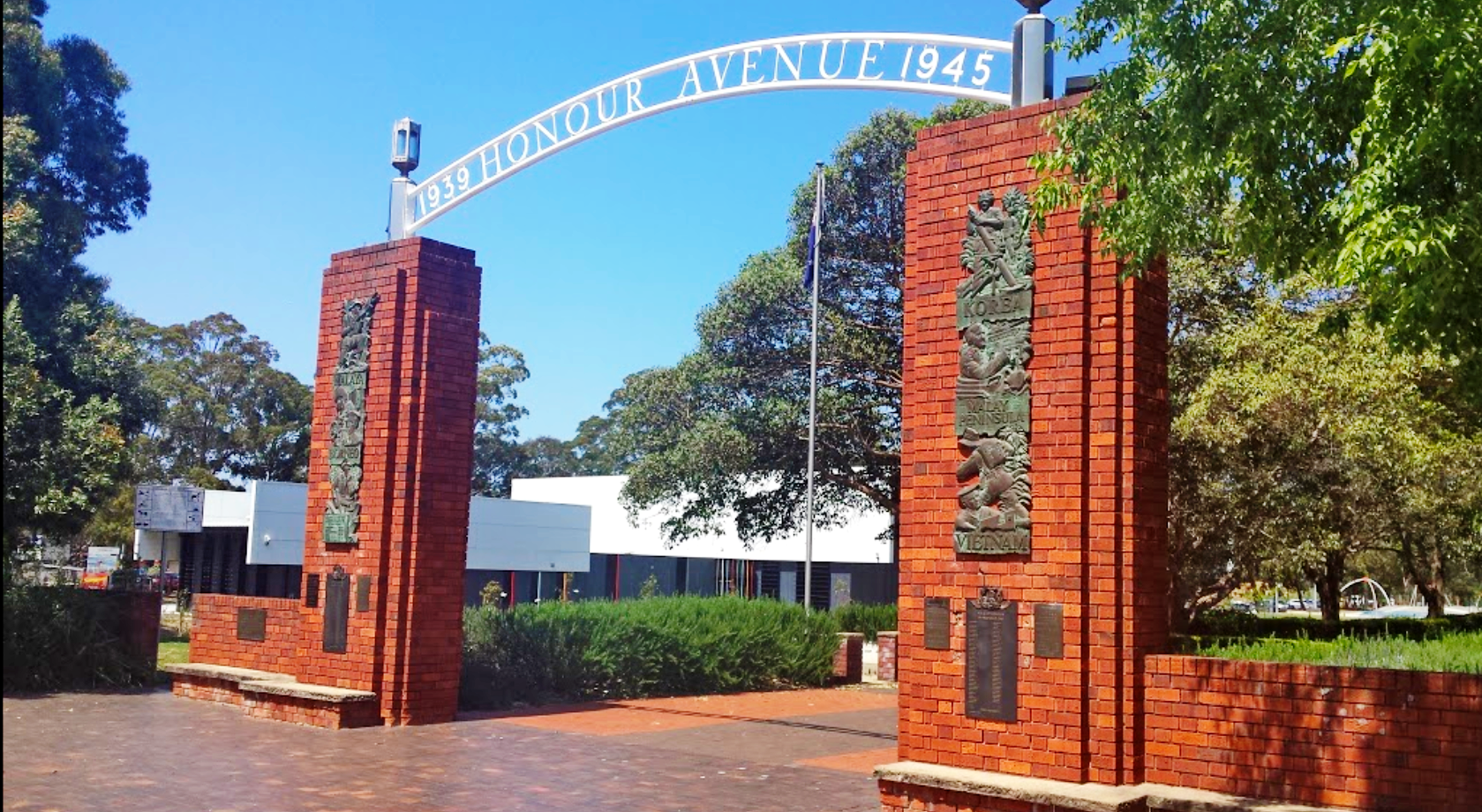
Honour Avenue, the main entrance to the park

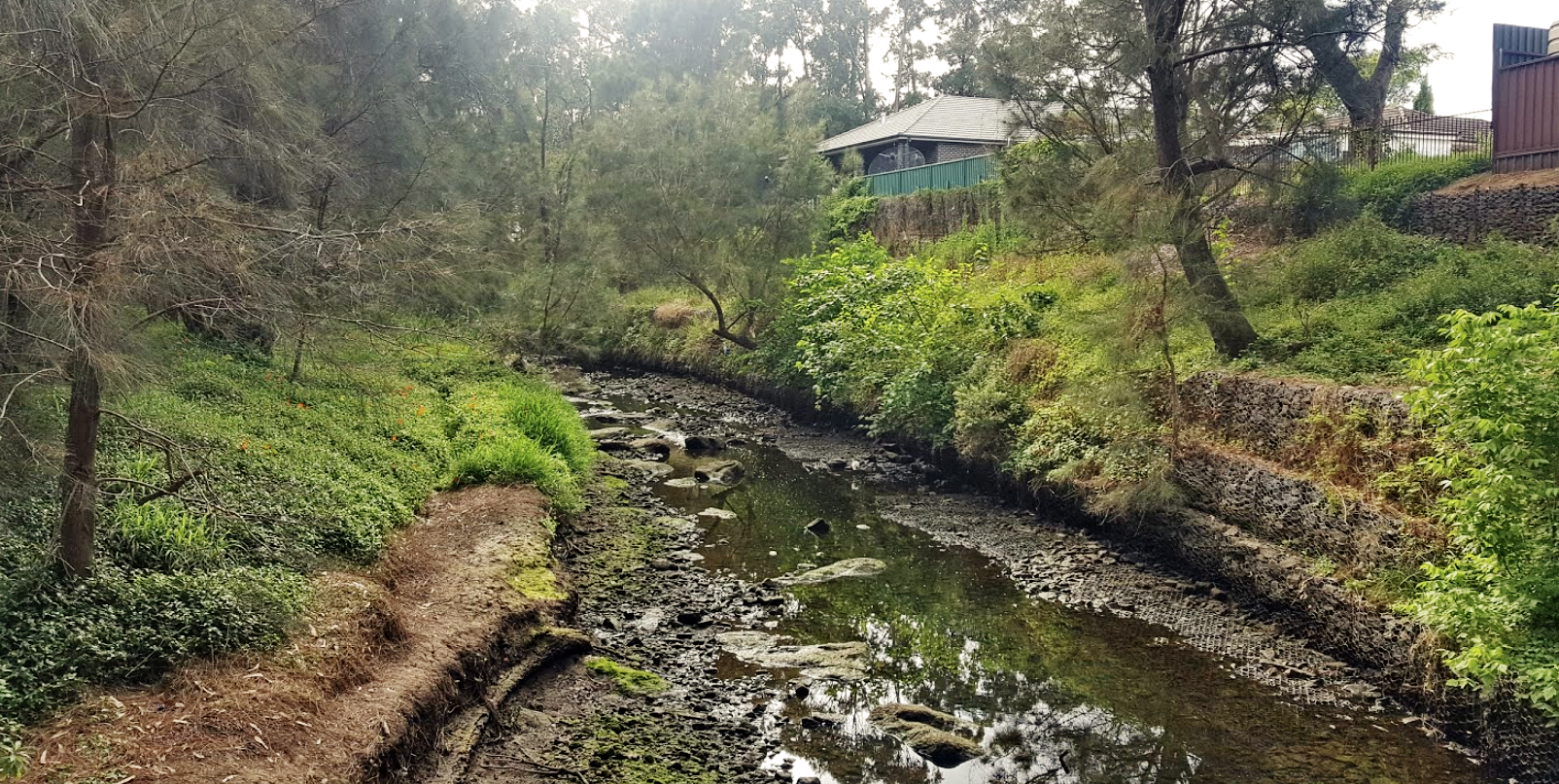
Prospect Creek

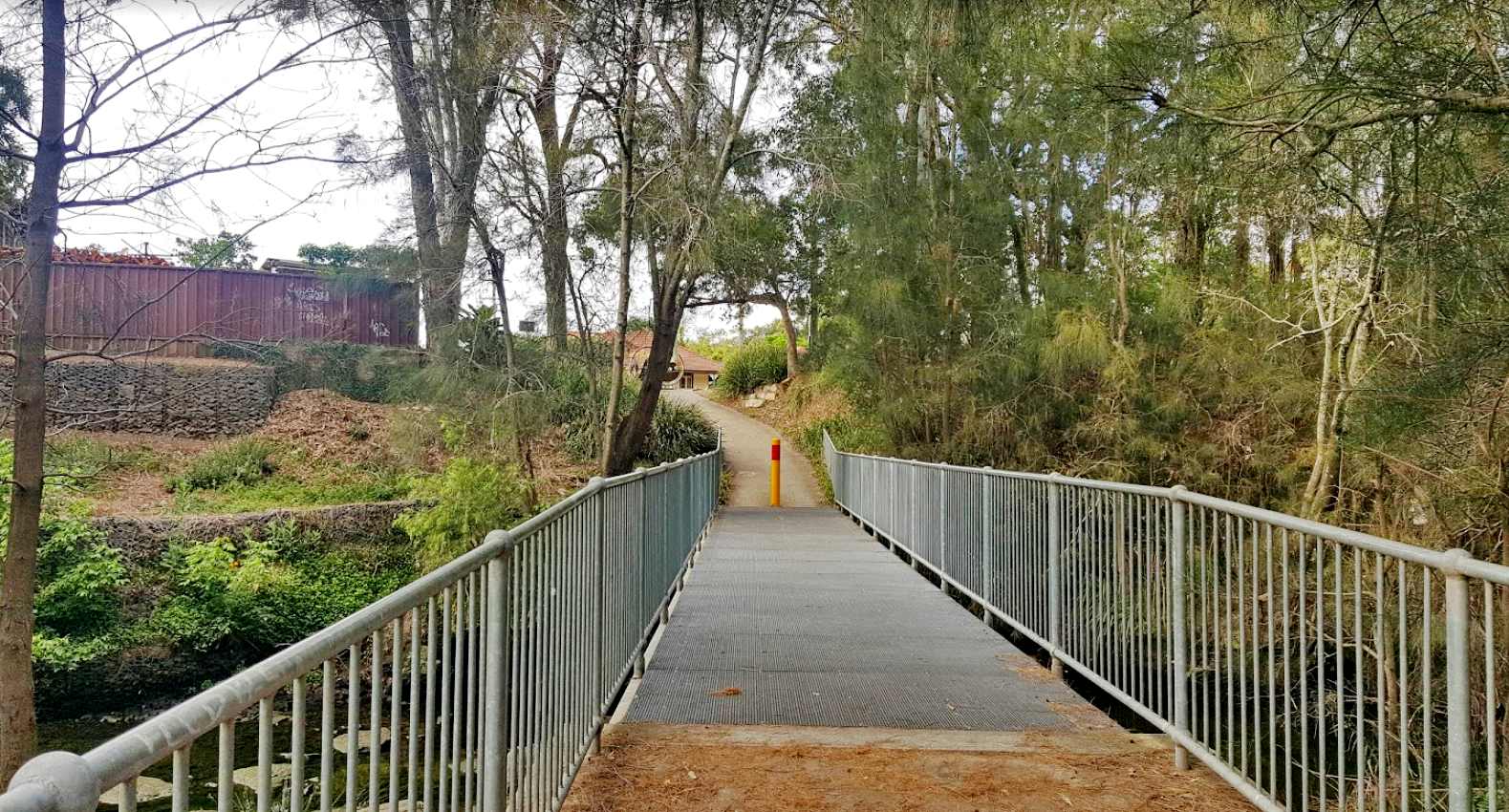
The pedestrian bridge over the creek

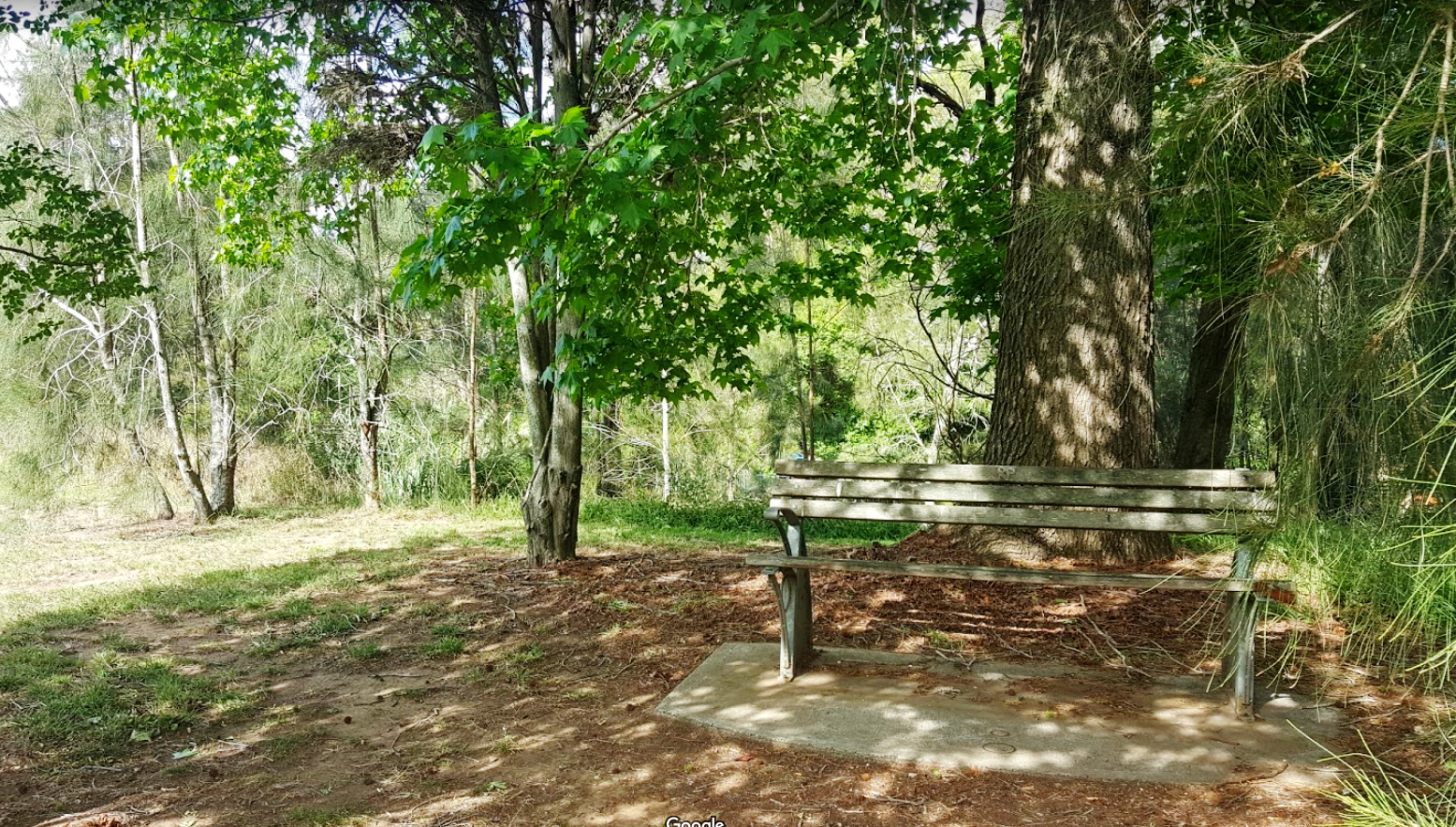
A seating area within the woodland

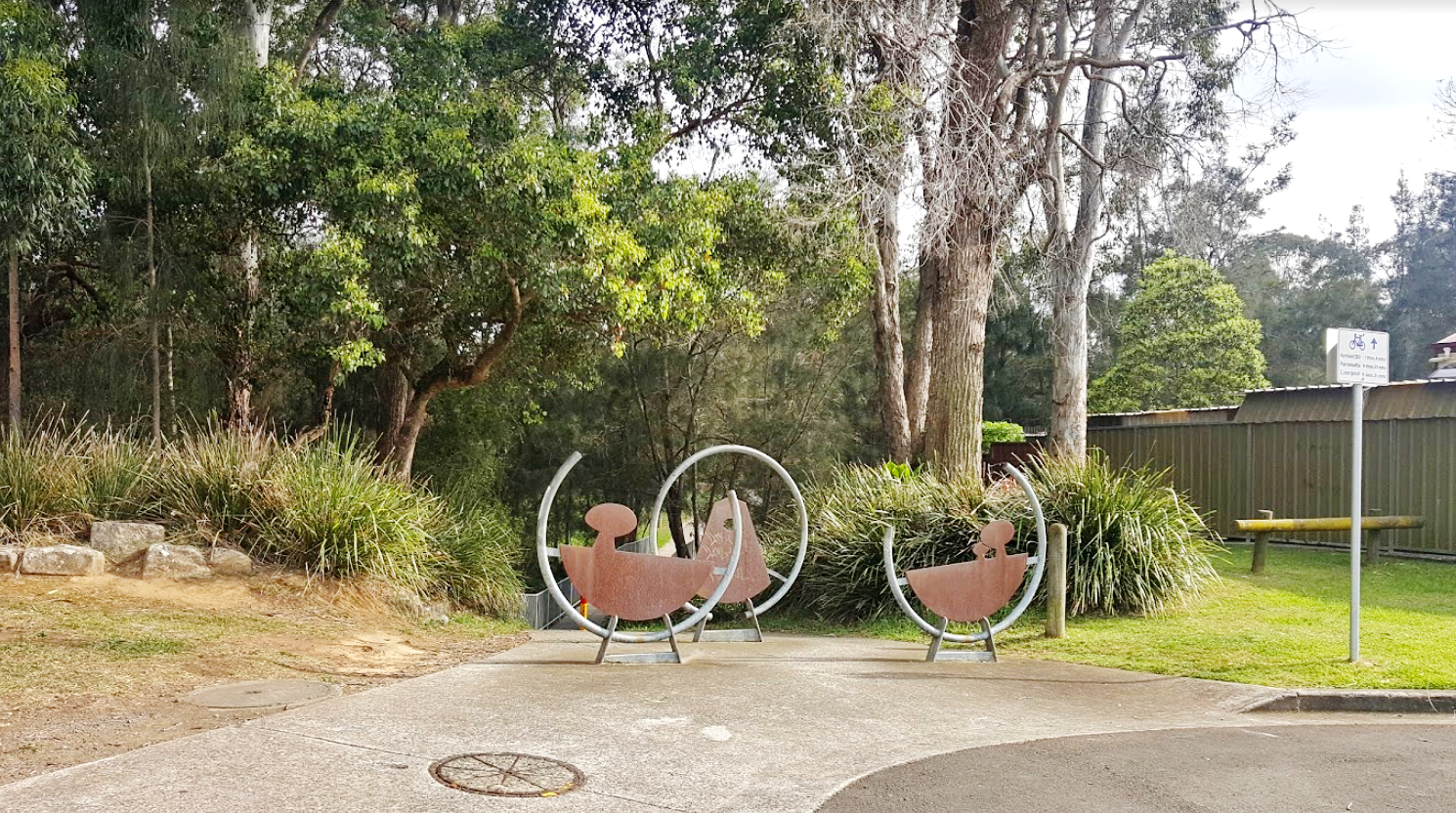
Entrance from the southern end of the park, in Haughton Street Carramar

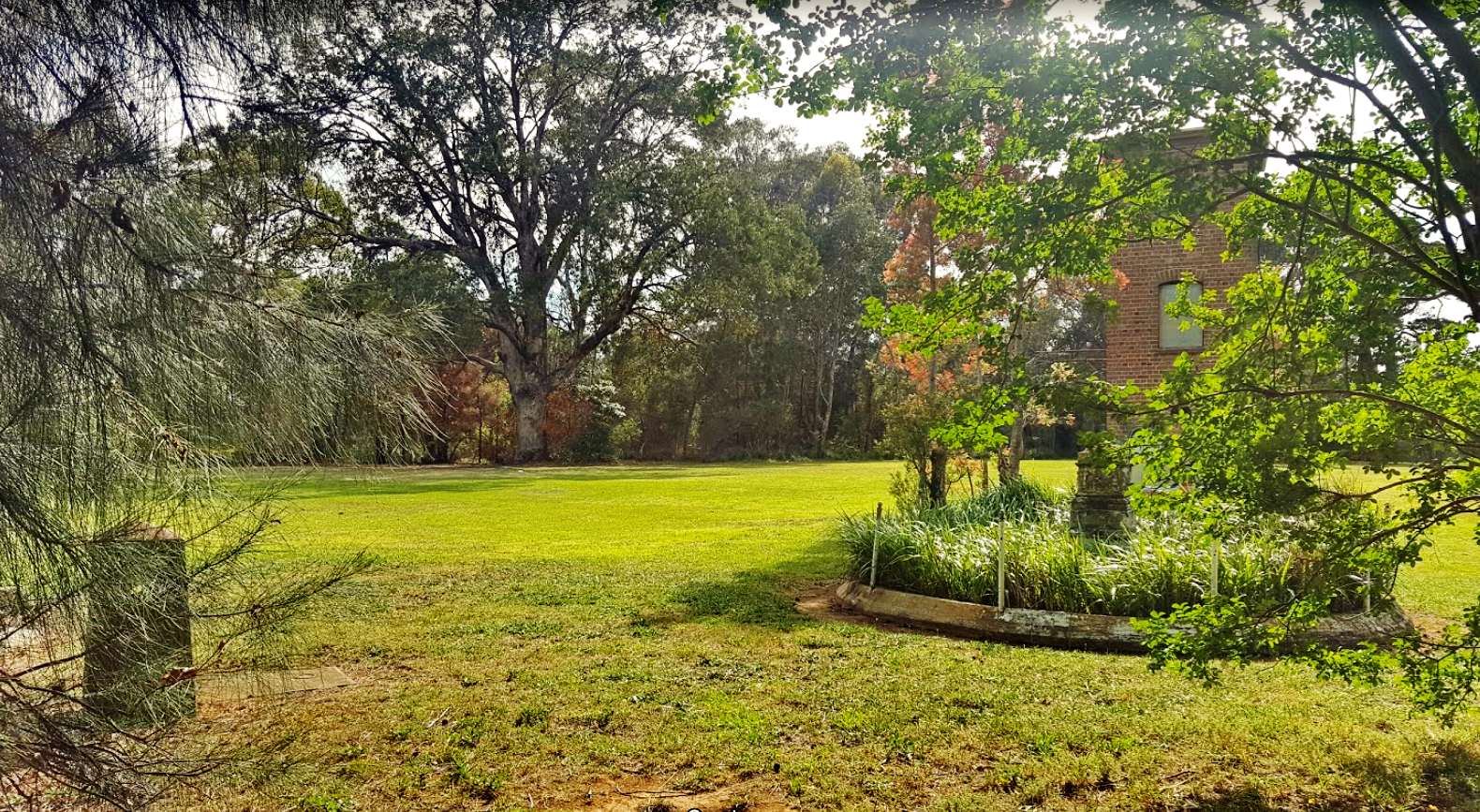
The park's open grassland

== See also ==
- Brenan Park
- Rosford Street Reserve
- Bland Oak, a historical tree just to the south of the park's borders
