= Carramar railway station =

Railway station in Sydney, New South Wales, Australia

Carramar
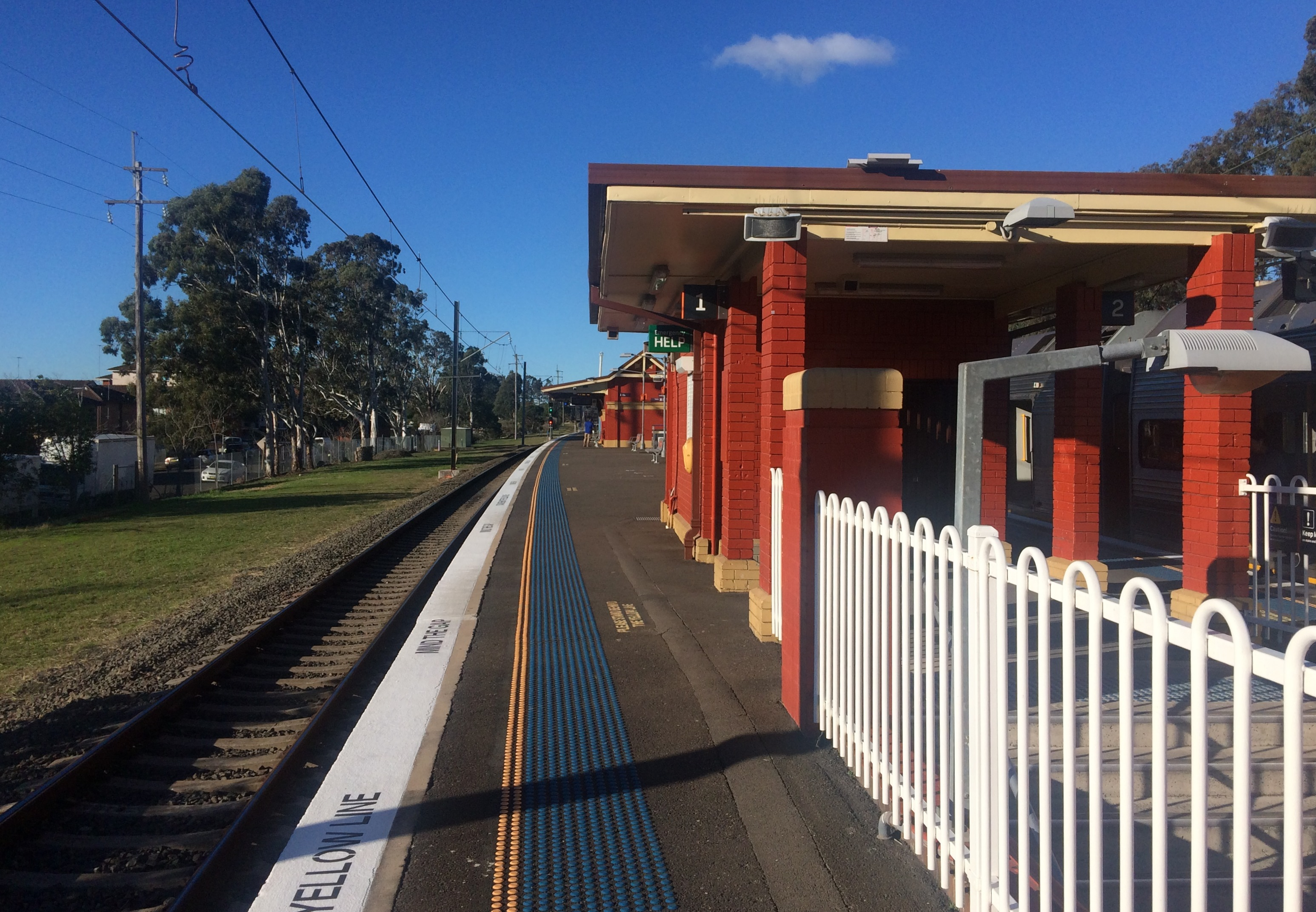
- Eastbound view in July 2018

General information
- Location: Wattle Avenue, Carramar; Australia
- Coordinates: 33°53′03″S 150°57′41″E
- Elevation: 11 metres (36 ft)
- Owner: Transport Asset Manager of New South Wales
- Operator: Sydney Trains
- Line: Main Southern
- Distance: 25.89 kilometres (16.09 mi) from Central
- Platforms: 2 (1 island)
- Tracks: 2

Construction
- Structure type: Ground
- Accessible: No

Other information
- Status: Weekdays: Staffed: 6am to 2pm: Weekends and public holidays: Unstaffed
- Station code: CMR
- Website: Transport for NSW

History
- Opened: 8 October 1924
- Former names: South Fairfield (1924–1926)

Passengers
- 2025: 304,012 (year); 833 (daily) (Sydney Trains)
- Rank: 177

Services
Preceding station	Sydney Trains	Following station
Cabramatta towards Liverpool	Liverpool & Inner West Line	Villawood towards City Circle
Location

Carramar railway station is a heritage-listed railway station on the Main Southern railway line in the Sydney suburb of Carramar. It is served by Sydney Trains' T3 Liverpool & Inner West Line services.

== History ==
Carramar station opened as South Fairfield on 8 October 1924 when the Main Southern railway line was extended from Regents Park to Cabramatta. It was renamed Carramar on 1 July 1926.

To the south of the station lies the Southern Sydney Freight Line, which opened in January 2013.

== Platforms and services ==
Historically, eastbound services connected Carramar to the City Circle via Lidcombe and the Main Suburban railway line. Between 2013 and 2024, eastbound services from Carramar to the City Circle ran only via an alternate route along the Bankstown railway line. Following the partial closure of the Bankstown railway line for Sydney Metro conversion in 2024, this situation reverted. Now eastbound services from Carramar operate to the City Circle via Lidcombe again, branded as the T3 Liverpool & Inner West Line.

Platform	Line	Stopping pattern	Notes
1	Liverpool & Inner West Line	services to Central & the City Circle via Regents Park	
2	Liverpool & Inner West Line	services to Liverpool	
