= List of government schools in New South Wales (D–F) =

Prior to 1848, most schools in New South Wales were operated by churches or private organisations, with some financial support from the government under the Denominational School Board, which was established in 1836. In January 1848, the Board of National Education began establishing government schools to develop a public education system, with the enactment and royal assent (16 August 1848) of the National Education Board Act 1848 (NSW). The first public school, Kempsey National School, opened that year, and by 1851, more than 37 public schools were in operation in New South Wales. As of 2025, the New South Wales Department of Education, a department of the Government of New South Wales, administers more than 2,200 public schools, both primary and secondary schools, across that state, that are in these lists:

== D ==
Name	Suburb/Town	Region	Opened	Coordinates	Ref
Daceyville Public School	Daceyville	Eastern Sydney	1914	33°55′44.08″S 151°13′37.71″E	
Dalgety Public School	Dalgety	Snowy Mountains	1889	36°30′10.71″S 148°50′11.9″E	
Dalmeny Public School	Prestons	South Western Sydney	2003	33°56′48.65″S 150°52′17.05″E	
Dalton Public School	Dalton	Southern Tablelands	1878	34°43′10.24″S 149°10′45.2″E	
Dapto High School	Dapto		1958	34°30′3.12″S 150°47′8.54″E	
Dapto Public School	West Dapto	Illawarra	1876	34°29′40.91″S 150°46′36.07″E	
Darcy Road Public School	Wentworthville	Greater Western Sydney	1955	33°48′6.05″S 150°57′59.13″E	
Dareton Public School	Dareton	Far West	1927	34°5′31.65″S 142°2′29.02″E	
Darlinghurst Public School	Darlinghurst	Eastern Sydney	1883	33°52′42.7″S 151°13′24.35″E	
Darlington Point Public School	Darlington Point	Riverina	1882	34°34′20.24″S 145°59′37.87″E	
Darlington Public School	Chippendale	Eastern Sydney	1878	33°53′35.6″S 151°11′20.79″E	
Davidson High School	Frenchs Forest	Sydney	1972	33°44′42″S 151°12′18″E	
Dawson Public School	Dharruk	Greater Western Sydney	1972	33°44′41.47″S 150°48′57.14″E	
Dee Why Public School	Dee Why	Northern Beaches	1922	33°44′53.69″S 151°17′10.1″E	
Deepwater Public School	Deepwater	Northern Tablelands	1884	29°26′34.1″S 151°50′53.41″E	
Delegate Public School	Delegate	Monaro	1871	37°2′30.31″S 148°56′15.89″E	
Delungra Public School	Delungra	Northern Tablelands	1907	29°39′5.95″S 150°49′52.06″E	
Denham Court Public School	Denham Court	South Western Sydney	2021	33°58′54.34″S 150°48′55.95″E	
Deniliquin High School	Deniliquin	Riverina	1960	35°32′8.36″S 144°57′43.1″E	
Deniliquin Public School	North Deniliquin	Riverina	1861	35°32′8.68″S 144°57′42.94″E	
Denison College of Secondary Education - Kelso High Campus	Kelso	Central Tablelands	1976	33°24′42.13″S 149°36′55.25″E	
Denison College of Secondary Education - Bathurst High Campus	Bathurst	Central West	1883	33°24′47.64″S 149°34′12.22″E	
Denistone East Public School	Denistone East	Northern Sydney	1950	33°47′36.19″S 151°5′50.49″E	
Denman Public School	Denman	Hunter	1883	32°23′8.44″S 150°41′9.62″E	
Dobroyd Point Public School	Haberfield	Inner West	1937	33°52′28.1″S 151°8′24.92″E	
Doonside High School	Doonside	Greater Western Sydney	1964	33°45′19.21″S 150°52′23.98″E	
Doonside Public School	Doonside	Greater Western Sydney	1937	33°45′53.26″S 150°52′12.64″E	
Doonside Technology High School	Doonside	Greater Western Sydney	1964	33°45′19.21″S 150°52′23.98″E	
Dora Creek Public School	Dora Creek	Hunter	1870	33°4′47.75″S 151°29′57.31″E	
Dorchester School	Airds	Greater Western Sydney	1973	34°5′21.04″S 150°49′35.42″E	
Dorrigo High School	Dorrigo	Northern Tablelands	1968	30°20′18.22″S 152°42′23.86″E	
Dorrigo Public School	Dorrigo	Northern Tablelands	1895	30°20′38.51″S 152°42′36.33″E	
Dorroughby Environmental Education Centre	Dorroughby	Northern Rivers	1977	28°39′22.35″S 153°21′5.95″E	
Double Bay Public School	Double Bay	Eastern Sydney	1883	33°52′28.73″S 151°14′27.24″E	
Doubtful Creek Public School	Doubtful Creek	Northern Rivers	1930	28°43′29.42″S 152°52′32.83″E	
Douglas Park Public School	Douglas Park	Greater Western Sydney	1883	34°10′45.66″S 150°42′48.27″E	
Drake Public School	Drake	New England	1887	28°55′42.48″S 152°22′27.05″E	
Drummond Memorial Public School	Armidale	Northern Tablelands	1890	30°30′38.91″S 151°39′1.51″E	
Drummoyne Public School	Drummoyne	Inner West	1886	33°51′21″S 151°9′9″E	
Dubbo College - Delroy Campus	Dubbo	Orana	1980	32°15′2.47″S 148°34′58.18″E	
Dubbo College - Senior Campus	Dubbo	Orana	2000	32°14′6.11″S 148°37′42.67″E	
Dubbo College - South Campus	Dubbo	Orana	1965	32°16′6.85″S 148°36′42.58″E	
Dubbo North Public School	Dubbo	Orana	1931	32°14′26.36″S 148°36′56.2″E	
Dubbo Public School	Dubbo	Orana	1858	32°14′57″S 148°36′20.59″E	
Dubbo School of Distance Education	Dubbo	Orana	1991	32°14′35.57″S 148°38′20.32″E	
Dubbo South Public School	Dubbo	Orana	1942	32°15′47.31″S 148°36′34.97″E	
Dubbo West Public School	Dubbo	Orana	1944	32°15′5.05″S 148°35′19.6″E	
Dudley Public School	Dudley	Hunter	1892	32°59′21.47″S 151°43′2.19″E	
Dulwich High School of Visual Arts & Design	Dulwich Hill	Inner West	2003	33°54′14.32″S 151°8′38.19″E	
Dulwich Hill Public School	Dulwich Hill	Inner West	1885	33°54′21.81″S 151°8′24.93″E	
Dundurrabin Public School	Dundurrabin	Northern Rivers	1904	30°11′21.95″S 152°32′32.93″E	
Dunedoo Central School	Dunedoo	Orana	1896	32°1′5.89″S 149°23′34.92″E	
Dungay Public School	Dungay	Northern Rivers	1893	28°17′19.79″S 153°22′56.01″E	
Dungog High School	Dungog	Hunter	1971	32°23′49.67″S 151°45′0.35″E	
Dungog Public School	Dungog	Hunter	1851	32°24′21.34″S 151°45′27.95″E	
Dungowan Public School	Dungowan	Northern Rivers	1974	31°13′14.27″S 151°7′57.17″E	
Dunoon Public School	Dunoon	Northern Rivers	1884	28°41′12.97″S 153°18′57.4″E	
Dural Public School	Dural	Greater Western Sydney	1869	33°41′12.69″S 151°1′37.76″E	
Duranbah Public School	Duranbah	Northern Rivers	1892	28°17′19.76″S 153°31′0.15″E	
Duri Public School	Duri	New England	1887	31°13′17.14″S 150°49′48.87″E	
Durrumbul Public School	Durrumbul	Northern Rivers	1900	28°31′23.89″S 153°26′41.58″E	

== E ==
Name	Suburb/Town	Region	Opened	Coordinates	Ref
E A Southee Public School	Cootamundra	Riverina	1969	34°38′31.91″S 148°0′48.94″E	
Eagle Vale High School	Eagle Vale	Macarthur	1984	34°2′25.64″S 150°48′11.63″E	
Earlwood Public School	Earlwood	Inner West	1916	33°55′41.87″S 151°7′22.1″E	
East Hills Boys High School	Panania	South Western Sydney	1955	33°57′27.36″S 150°59′34.78″E	
East Hills Girls Technology High School	Panania	South Western Sydney	1953	33°57′27.33″S 150°59′34.78″E	
East Hills Public School	Panania	South Western Sydney	1952	33°57′31.25″S 150°59′30.98″E	
Eastern Creek Public School	Eastern Creek	Greater West	1866	33°47′13.8″S 150°51′11.8″E	
Eastlakes Public School	Eastlakes	South Eastern Sydney	1944	33°55′39.71″S 151°12′50.21″E	
Eastwood Heights Public School	Eastwood	Northern Suburbs	1958	33°46′53.03″S 151°5′44.64″E	
Eastwood Public School	Eastwood	Northern Suburbs	1884	33°47′32.98″S 151°4′40.55″E	
Ebenezer Public School	Ebenezer	Greater West	1887	33°31′52.04″S 150°52′38.61″E	
Ebor Public School	Ebor	Northern Tablelands	1907	30°24′9.61″S 152°20′57.95″E	
Eden Marine High School	Eden	Far South Coast	1974	37°3′20.64″S 149°54′23.81″E	
Eden Public School	Eden	Far South Coast	1857	37°3′49.15″S 149°54′20.36″E	
Edensor Park Public School	Edensor Park	South Western Sydney	1989	33°52′55.72″S 150°52′33.64″E	
Edgeware School	Hurlstone Park	Inner West	1990	33°54′49.22″S 151°7′53.72″E	
Edgeworth Heights Public School	Edgeworth	Hunter	1958	32°55′28.76″S 151°36′34.61″E	
Edgeworth Public School	Edgeworth	Hunter	1891	32°55′20.75″S 151°37′17.18″E	
Edmondson Park Public School	Edmondson Park	South Western Sydney	2023	33°57′55.28″S 150°51′10.6″E	
Edward Public School	Deniliquin	Riverina	1972	35°31′29.17″S 144°57′4.65″E	
Eglinton Public School	Eglinton	Central West	1868	33°22′41.24″S 149°32′24.78″E	
Elands Public School	Elands	Mid North Coast	1916	31°37′10.21″S 152°17′32.47″E	
Elanora Heights Public School	Elanora Heights	Northern Beaches	1960	33°42′13.1″S 151°17′4.2″E	
Elderslie High School	Elderslie	South Western Sydney	1976	34°3′9.3″S 150°42′56.15″E	
Eleebana Public School	Eleebana	Hunter	1955	32°59′27.67″S 151°38′34.26″E	
Elermore Vale Public School	Elermore Vale	Hunter	1957	32°54′52.39″S 151°39′57.96″E	
Elizabeth Macarthur High School	Narellan Vale	Macarthur	1957	34°3′25.09″S 150°44′21.91″E	
Ellalong Public School	Ellalong	Hunter	1863	32°54′53.33″S 151°18′45.46″E	
Ellerston Public School	Ellerston	Hunter	1879	31°49′4″S 151°18′15.49″E	
Ellison Public School	Springwood	Blue Mountains	1986	33°41′25.26″S 150°35′6.08″E	
Eltham Public School	Eltham	Northern Rivers	1884	28°45′49.39″S 153°24′30.32″E	
Emerton Public School	Emerton	Greater West	1970	33°44′41.24″S 150°48′19.6″E	
Emmaville Central School	Emmaville	New England	1875	29°26′49.88″S 151°36′3.07″E	
Empire Bay Public School	Empire Bay	Central Coast	1881	33°30′15.46″S 151°21′48.02″E	
Empire Vale Public School	Empire Vale	Northern Rivers	1877	28°54′52.84″S 153°30′20.37″E	
Emu Heights Public School	Emu Heights	Greater West	1972	33°44′12.88″S 150°38′54.37″E	
Emu Plains Public School	Emu Plains	Greater West	1877	33°45′21.01″S 150°39′30.03″E	
Endeavour Sports High School	Caringbah	Southern Sydney	1964	34°1′48.82″S 151°7′9.18″E	
Enfield Public School	Enfield	Inner West	1924	33°53′19.09″S 151°5′38.73″E	
Engadine High School	Engadine	Southern Sydney	1969	34°3′43″S 151°1′8″E	
Engadine Public School	Engadine	Southern Sydney	1932	34°3′47.04″S 151°0′43.17″E	
Engadine West Public School	Engadine	Southern Sydney	1961	34°3′31.34″S 151°0′8.77″E	
Enngonia Public School	Enngonia	Far West	1884	29°19′5.54″S 145°50′42.95″E	
Epping Boys High School	Eastwood	Northern Sydney	1957	33°46′11.64″S 151°5′56.04″E	
Epping Heights Public School	Epping	Northern Sydney	1968	33°45′44.87″S 151°4′28.11″E	
Epping North Public School	North Epping	Northern Sydney	1960	33°45′23.6″S 151°5′44.06″E	
Epping Public School	Epping	Northern Sydney	1901	33°46′15.05″S 151°5′18.12″E	
Epping West Public School	Epping	Northern Sydney	1927	33°46′21.37″S 151°4′7.16″E	
Erina Heights Public School	Erina Heights	Central Coast	1873	33°25′39.94″S 151°24′47.84″E	
Erina High School	Erina	Central Coast	1964	33°26′23.4″S 151°22′52.55″E	
Ermington Public School	West Ryde	Northern Sydney	1888	33°48′17.86″S 151°4′12.53″E	
Ermington West Public School	Ermington	Greater West		33°48′21.9″S 151°3′30.47″E	
Erskine Park High School	Erskine Park	Greater West	1991	33°48′29.09″S 150°48′12.39″E	
Erskineville Public School	Erskineville	Inner West	1893	33°54′1″S 151°11′10″E	
Eschol Park Public School	Eschol Park	South Western Sydney	1985	34°1′42.11″S 150°48′39.49″E	
Ettalong Public School	Ettalong Beach	Central Coast	1928	33°30′48.92″S 151°19′56.54″E	
Euabalong West Public School	Euabalong West	Central West	1932	33°3′19.52″S 146°23′49.39″E	
Euchareena Public School	Euchareena	Central West	1882	32°56′14.63″S 149°5′28.1″E	
Eugowra Public School	Eugowra	Central West	1879	33°25′26.21″S 148°22′7.55″E	
Eumungerie Public School	Eumungerie	Central West	1904	31°57′2.33″S 148°37′14.51″E	
Eungai Public School	Eungai Creek	Mid North Coast	1893	30°49′57.91″S 152°52′31.76″E	
Eureka Public School	Eureka	Northern Rivers	1887	28°41′16.52″S 153°26′19.54″E	
Eurongilly Public School	Eurongilly	Riverina	1918	34°54′37.7″S 147°46′50.82″E	
Euston Public School	Euston	Riverina	1865	34°34′31.05″S 142°44′40.4″E	
Evans High School	Blacktown	Greater West	1973	33°47′13″S 150°53′22.85″E	
Evans River Community School	Evans Head	Northern Rivers	1920	29°6′47.98″S 153°25′33.95″E	
Excelsior Public School	Castle Hill	Greater West	1971	33°44′25.9″S 150°59′25.49″E	
Exeter Public School	Exeter	Southern Highlands	1891	34°36′59.48″S 150°19′17.74″E	

== F ==
Name	Suburb/Town	Region	Opened	Coordinates	Ref
Fairfax Public School	Maules Creek	New England	1910	30°29′36.17″S 150°7′54.06″E	
Fairfield Heights Public School	Fairfield Heights	Greater West	1952	33°51′58.85″S 150°56′25.36″E	
Fairfield High School	Fairfield	Western Sydney	1981	33°51′54″S 150°57′29″E	
Fairfield Public School	Fairfield	Western Sydney	1889	33°52′3.55″S 150°57′18.63″E	
Fairfield West Public School	Fairfield West	Western Sydney	1925	33°52′5.69″S 150°55′28.64″E	
Fairvale High School	Fairfield West	Western Sydney	1969	33°52′25.6″S 150°55′46.37″E	
Fairvale Public School	Fairfield West	Western Sydney	1956	33°52′36.16″S 150°56′26.68″E	
Fairy Meadow Demonstration School	Fairy Meadow	Illawarra	1858	34°23′26.38″S 150°53′31″E	
Falls Creek Public School	Falls Creek	Illawarra	1886	34°57′58.64″S 150°35′38.06″E	
Farmborough Road Public School	Unanderra	Illawarra	1956	34°27′38.12″S 150°50′8.87″E	
Farrer Memorial Agricultural High School	Calala	New England	1939	31°8′26.46″S 150°58′51.63″E	
Fassifern Public School	Fassifern	Lake Macquarie	1922	32°59′0.14″S 151°34′58.6″E	
Faulconbridge Public School	Faulconbridge	Blue Mountains	1965	33°41′27.29″S 150°32′44.62″E	
Fennell Bay Public School	Fennell Bay	Greater Newcastle	1959	32°59′31.69″S 151°36′5.64″E	
Fern Bay Public School	Fern Bay	Hunter	1955	32°52′19.51″S 151°47′40.76″E	
Ferncourt Public School	Marrickville	Inner West	1922	33°55′14″S 151°9′7″E	
Fernhill School	Glenmore Park	Western Sydney	2017	33°47′46″S 150°40′37″E	
Fernleigh Public School	Fernleigh	Northern Rivers	1894	28°46′3.52″S 153°29′54.89″E	
Field of Mars Environmental Education Centre	East Ryde	Northern Sydney	1987	33°48′58.04″S 151°7′58.07″E	
Figtree Heights Public School	Figtree	Illawarra	1972	34°25′53″S 150°51′22″E	
Figtree High School	Figtree	Illawarra	1969	34°26′20″S 150°51′14″E	
Figtree Public School	Figtree	Illawarra	1956	34°26′26.96″S 150°51′15.83″E	
Fingal Head Public School	Fingal Head	North Coast	1913	28°11′48.5″S 153°33′55.25″E	
Finley High School	Finley	Riverina	1961	35°38′26.13″S 145°34′22.54″E	
Finley Public School	Finley	Riverina	1895	35°38′22.68″S 145°34′31.45″E	
Fisher Road School	Dee Why	Northern Beaches	1953	33°44′46.52″S 151°17′12.35″E	
Five Dock Public School	Five Dock	Inner West	1861	33°52′0.27″S 151°7′38.35″E	
Five Islands Secondary College	Port Kembla	Illawarra	1961	34°29′21″S 150°54′50″E	
Flinders Public School	Flinders	South Coast	2003	34°34′56.59″S 150°50′55.67″E	
Floraville Public School	Floraville	Lake Macquarie	1967	33°0′51.2″S 151°39′49.82″E	
Forbes High School	Forbes	Central West	1955	33°21′47.09″S 148°0′41.61″E	
Forbes North Public School	Forbes	Central West	1957	33°22′15.32″S 148°0′5.62″E	
Forbes Public School	Forbes	Central West	1862	33°23′15.21″S 148°0′22.08″E	
Forest High School	Frenchs Forest	Northern Beaches	1961	33°45′1.49″S 151°13′47.78″E	
Forest Hill Public School	Forest Hill	Wagga Wagga	1878	35°8′53.66″S 147°28′1.03″E	
Forest House School	Surry Hills	Eastern Suburbs	1969	33°53′9.49″S 151°12′44.95″E	
Forest Lodge Public School	Forest Lodge	Inner West	1883	33°52′55.82″S 151°10′53.68″E	
Forestville Public School	Forestville	Northern Beaches	1953	33°45′41.66″S 151°12′46.07″E	
Forster Public School	Forster	Mid North Coast	1872	32°10′53.7″S 152°31′26.75″E	
Fort Street High School	Petersham	Inner West	1849	33°53′23.38″S 151°9′11.9″E	
Fort Street Public School	Millers Point	City of Sydney	1850	33°51′37.61″S 151°12′17.72″E	
Fowler Road School	Merrylands	Hunter	1980	33°50′29.05″S 150°58′32.89″E	
Francis Greenway High School	Beresford	Hunter	1966	32°47′51.04″S 151°39′37.76″E	
Frank Partridge VC Public School	Nambucca Heads	Mid North Coast	1989	30°38′32.38″S 152°59′8.09″E	
Franklin Public School	Tumut	South West Slopes	1976	35°18′55.21″S 148°13′47.57″E	
Frederickton Public School	Frederickton	Mid North Coast	1861	31°2′4.28″S 152°52′44.98″E	
Freemans Reach Public School	Freemans Reach	Hawkesbury	1867	33°33′30.19″S 150°47′56.47″E	
Frenchs Forest Public School	Frenchs Forest	Northern Beaches	1916	33°45′5.28″S 151°13′29.29″E	

== See also ==
Organisations

- Education in New South Wales
- New South Wales Education Standards Authority
- Australian Curriculum

Lists

- List of schools in New South Wales
- List of government schools in New South Wales
- List of non-government schools in New South Wales
- List of selective high schools in New South Wales
- List of Catholic schools in New South Wales
- List of Anglican schools in New South Wales
- List of Islamic schools in New South Wales
- Lists of schools in Australia
