= Bathurst High School =

Bathurst High School may refer to:

- Bathurst High School (New South Wales), in New South Wales, Australia
- Bathurst High School (New Brunswick), in New Brunswick, Canada
