= Horsley complex =

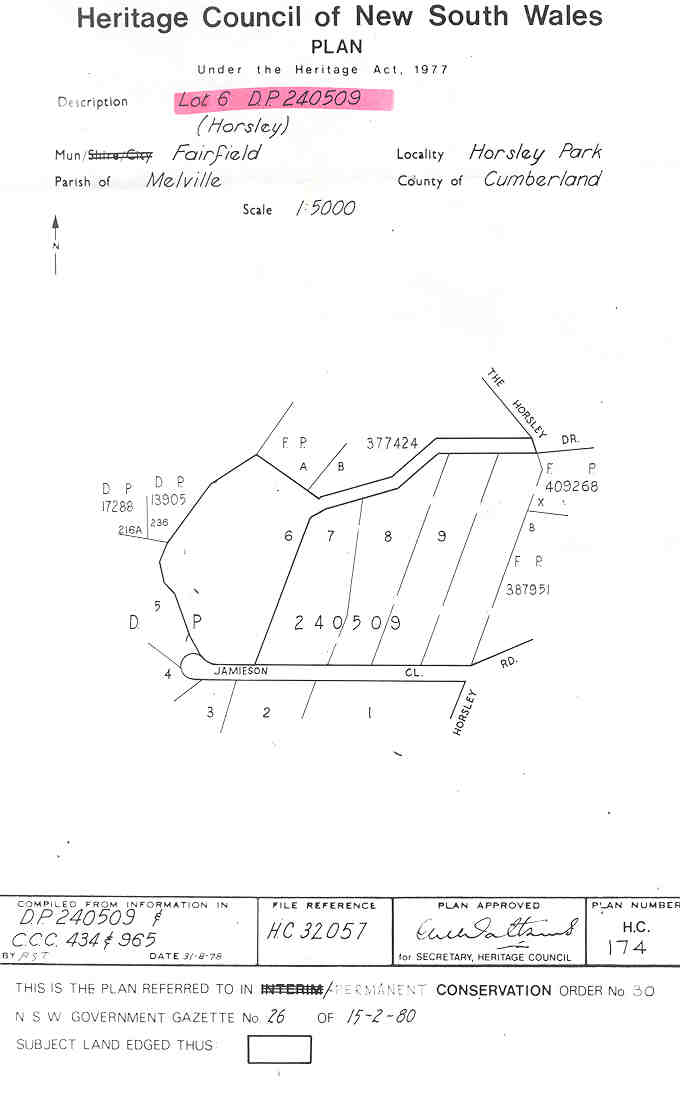
- Heritage boundaries

- Location within Sydney Location within Australia
- 33°50′31″S 150°50′29″E
- Location: 52–58 Jamieson Close, Horsley Park, City of Fairfield, New South Wales, Australia

History
- Built: 1805–1832

New South Wales Heritage Register
- Official name: Horsley complex (homestead, outbuildings, garden, farm); Horsley Park; King's Gift; Horsley House
- Type: State heritage (landscape)
- Designated: 2 April 1999
- Reference no.: 30
- Type: Homestead Complex
- Category: Farming and Grazing

The Horsley complex is a heritage-listed rural estate at 52–58 Jamieson Close, Horsley Park, New South Wales, a suburb of.Sydney, Australia. It was built from 1805 to 1832, with uses as a vineyard, orchard, horse and livestock breeding farm. It was added to the New South Wales State Heritage Register on 2 April 1999. The heritage listing for the complex covers the residence and surrounding pastoral property, also known as Horsley complex (homestead, outbuildings, garden, farm), Horsley Park, King's Gift and Horsley House.

== History ==
=== Establishment of the Horsley estate (1831–1839) and naming of Horsley ===
In 1805, Governor King granted Lieutenant Colonel George Johnston of Annandale farm 2000 acres of land at Prospect, for his part in putting down a convict uprising at Castle Hill in the previous year. Johnston called the farm "King's Gift". Johnston died in 1823.

A related place is Horsley near Dapto (Wollongong), which was a grant c. 1818/19 to George Weston's elder brother, William Francis Weston, known as "Mr Johnston's Meadow". William Francis Weston died in 1826 leaving a widow and five small children, and it is possible that George Weston came to Australia to advise and help his sister in law, Elizabeth around this time.

The Horsley (Fairfield) land was given by Col. Johnston to his daughter Blanche, who, on 21 May 1829, at St. James' Church, Sydney, married George Edward Nicholas Weston, a Lieutenant in the East India Company Service. Weston had a Swiss mother and his family had descendants on West Horsley Manor in Surrey in England dating back to 1066, farming large estates. It is thought Horsley (Fairfield) is named after West Horsley Manor in Surrey.

=== The Weston family and estate life ===
Captain & Mrs George Weston spent the following two years in India, returning to Sydney with their two children in July 1831. In that year they took up their property, living in a large Indian tent attended by Indian servants until the house was completed.

In 1832, the homestead was built by then, together with major outbuildings (kitchen, stables, blacksmith's shop and barn).

The well-wooded land produced timber carted to sawmills for many years. The Westons' predominant interests were agriculture and raising stock, including fine bloodstock race horses. Captain Weston (from reports in the Australian between 1831 and 1841) was involved with the Cumberland Turf Club, the Australian Race Committee, fox hunting, and with contemporary political issues.

In 1839, Captain Weston was one of the promoters of a public meeting to petition the continuation of transportation of convicts to maintain the supply of low cost farm labour. An 1843 Sydney Morning Herald report noted his indignation at the loss of a convict's labour by the Governor's order, his support for neighbour William Lawson (of Greystanes) in elections to the Legislative Council in 1843 and his animosity to Hannibal Macarthur in the same election. Other 1844 Sydney Morning Herald reports show his involvement in establishing the Penrith Agricultural Society and his award for the best coaching stallion.

The Westons had eight children, 4 girls and 4 boys, 1 of whom died in infancy.

In 1837, Captain Weston had a pack of foxhounds at Horsley, and by 1838 his pastoral activities had extended beyond the limits of location, and he held a grazing lease in South-West Yass.

An 1841, sale notice in the Australian cited land near the "mansion and improving property" of Captain Weston, but the area was not closely settled then.

The Westons exported horses to India, a Sydney Morning Herald report of 29 August 1844 describing 80 horses loaded onto the Blondell bound for Calcutta, of which 31 belonged to Blanche's brothers Robert and David Johnston, and Captain Weston. Although East India Company agents left Calcutta in 1847, horse trading between the Australian colonies continued at a diminishing rate for several more years.

George Weston died at Horsley in 1856 at the age of 56 and was buried at St. Bartholemew's cemetery at Prospect. His widow Blanche continued to conduct the farm business, supported by her extended family, and employees and their families, who had been in her service for many years.

An 1871 storey in the Town & Country journal describes a garden, vineyard of about 15 acres which produced 2000 gallons of wine in 1870 and none due to blight in 1871, and Mr Frank (Francis, the youngest son, then managing the property)'s pride, his horse stock, many of which were successful race horses.

The main driveway from front gates was lined with bunya pines (from photographs these were possibly planted by 1860s/70s) terminating in two Moreton Bay figs, where it reached the crest of the hill on which the house stood. Circular carriage loop and shrubbery laid out in front (east) of house. Later a small carriage drive was laid out (along what is now the north and west site boundaries), and a planted maze.

Blanche Weston died in 1904 at the age of 98. At that time, some of her employees were the third generation of those families in service and residence at Horsley. In 1904, the main activity was again grazing, with all the wine used in the house produced on the estate, fine vineyards and orchards. A report in the Cumberland Argus 3 September 1904 notes this, and that wheat had been formerly grown but abandoned due to rust attacks years ago.

During Blanche's lifetime, there had been a number of changes to the package of land comprising Horsley and smaller adjoining grants, which had become the property of other Johnston family members or been used to negotiate exchanges with Weston land elsewhere.

=== Late nineteenth-century prosperity and consolidation and changes to land holdings ===
In 1906, Blanches' widowed daughter Alice Smart successfully applied to have them all brought together under the one certificate of title, making her the owner of 2045 acres, by then traversed to the east by a section of the Sydney Water Supply Canal to Prospect Reservoir.

=== Subdivision and decline of the estate ===
In 1924 (or 1930), the estate was subdivided into 20 & 40 acre holdings, with approximately 65 acres including the homestead remaining in the possession of Miss Julia Perry, a Weston descendant (granddaughter) of Mrs. Weston). Julia Perry (née Antill), a granddaughter of Mrs Weston, lived there until the late 1930s, when the estate passed out of the hands of the Johnston-Weston family.

=== Moffitt family ownership (1939) ===
In January 1939, the property passed out of the Weston/Johnston family, being purchased by Frederic Moffitt, the father of the present (2002) owners, Mrs Helen Kerfoot and her sister Mrs June Vines. Moffitt occupied Horsley in May 1939. The barn (which was to the west of the house and at the end of the street of outbuildings) was demolished.

Before Frederic Moffit's death in 1951, he transferred the property to his wife. In 1957, two 5-acre blocks surveyed for possible sale. 5 acres was sold in 1959.

In 1960, 5 acres was sold, reducing site to 60 acres.

In 1966, Mrs Moffitt died and the property was inherited by the three remaining daughters. Helen Kerfoot, who had been living at Horsley with her mother for some years, continued to occupy the homestead portion, now with 12 acres.

In 1969, the property was surveyed and a new subdivision was laid out.

In 1972, the new subdivisions were sold. The site was reduced to 12 acres (4.45 hectares) but still included homestead, major outbuildings, driveway and most important tree plantings. New rear access to site provided via Jamison Close, also servicing new subdivisions.

Losses included:

- the pond, a small dam surrounded by trees immediately to the south of the front gates, and a favourite haunt of birds;
- the orchard on the southern slopes below the homestead and a small vineyard, originally with its own winepress, to the north;
- the cottage originally used by Mrs George Weston as a school for children on the property;
- the site of the original barn built over by a new residence.

By 1982, the site was ringed by new housing development built on the 1972 subdivisions. A poultry shed was built adjacent to the eastern boundary. The new developments were insensitive in their form and siting, and impinge on the major views of the homestead from the east and south-east approached along The Horsley Drive.

=== Conservation works ===
In 1971, general external repair and restoration works were carried out to the homestead, including new corrugated iron roofing, gutters and downpipes added, the iron on the south skillion replacing the extant Morewood & Roger's patent iron (roof) tiles. General repairs and painting were done to the homestead. The office and laundry's original joinery had severely deteriorated and was repaired/renewed to its original detail.

In 1976, external restoration work was carried out to the Stables block, with financial assistance from a Federal government National Estate grant, including repairs to the roof and guttering, walls and joinery.

== Description ==
=== Grounds ===
To the north of the outbuildings and down a slope was a vineyard, with its own wine press, and on the southern slopes to the house was an orchard.

The western property boundary is marked by a row of bunya pines (Araucaria bidwillii). On the northern slope there are extensive remains of orchard terracing and a second drive.

The vineyard of Horsley extended over the surrounding hillside and was tended initially by convicts and later by a German wine dresser especially brought out for the purpose as was the custom.

=== Garden ===
The garden provides an appropriate period setting for the house and is significant in its own right as well as being the setting for Horsley Homestead.

The approach is by a gently curving carriage drive through a formal avenue of bunya pines (Araucaria bidwillii) and Chir pines (Pinus roxburghii). On the crest of a hill at the western end of the avenue, the drive goes through an outer set of garden gates flanked by two huge Moreton Bay figs (Ficus macrophylla) which frame the entrance driveway to the house, groupings of plumbago (Plumbago capensis) and sweet bay (Laurus nobilis). Other trees such as jacarandas (Jacaranda mimosifolia) and Illawarra flame trees (Brachychiton acerifolius) were planted by Helen Kerfoot since the 1950s.

Closer to the house, the drive forks to form a petal shaped carriage loop which further divides to create a smaller, circular loop. The circular loop before the house's eastern front was formerly planted in a clearly visible (c. 1900 photographs) quatrefoil design which today is rather overgrown shrubbery, screening the view. Contained in this loop is a number of choice plants, including a rare South African plant, the Kei apple (Carissa grandiflora), bird-of-paradise flower (Strelitzia nicolae), sweet box (Murraya paniculata), crepe myrtle (Lagerstroemia indica), Nile lilies (Agapanthus orientalis) etc.

The drive winds north of the house and around to its rear (west where it turns west into a "street" of outbuildings and further on a rear drive to the south-west out to Horsley Road. Behind the house is a later tennis court and remnant flower beds. Tree plantings in this area include a Kaffir plum (Harpephyllum afrum) north-west of the house, five rare native corkwood trees (Duboisea myoporoides), a weeping Boree or myall (Acacia pendula) to the west. Further west is another large Moreton Bay fig.

HOUSE Horsley was a pastoral holding set up to be an entirely self-sufficient community. The substantial homestead was built on the highest of a series of wooded hills in gently undulating country, with fine views in all directions.

The single storey house is a direct copy of an Indian Bungalow, built of rendered brick made by convicts, with a high, hipped, shingled (later corrugated iron) roof. The walls are of stuccoed convict brick made on the property, strengthened by simple pilasters and between them are projecting panels with an arched recess in which the windows are set.

The roof is over an almost square arrangement of bedrooms opening from central drawing room, sitting room and dining room, a classic Indian bungalow design, of the type built in Bengal. Pillared verandas at front and back were included under the main roof and enclosed at either end by corner rooms.

On the garden (east) front it has a recessed central front veranda, supported by three pairs of Tuscan or Roman Doric columns. Wide shallow steps with bevel treads lead up to the veranda from the garden. French doors open onto the veranda from the drawing and dining rooms. This is now the main access to the house.

Rainwater from the roof drained directly into brick gutters surrounding the house and from there into an underground tank.

The house was built over a series of cellars - for wine on the north-western aspect, meat to the east end of the south aspect and dairy produce to the west end. It has an extensive wine cellar underneath almost its whole size, with sloping timbers to roll wine casks down into it, and rough timber shelves. A wooden door with stout wooden bars provides ventilation. The cellar ceiling is lath and plastered and whitewashed, as are the walls.

There are storage shelves in the blind arch in the wall and a pump removed the dregs from a floor drain. The shelves are carried on brick arches, and extra ventilation comes through the brick work of the arched opening which holds small shelves. (In 1931 whilst a corner of the cellar was being cleared, seven bottles of Horsley wine were found, nearly a hundred years old, and still in "excellent condition". A dairy is also located under the house on the other side, with a separate entrance.

The use of folding casement doors, of sixteen panes and, having adjustable louver shutters, indicate its British India design origins. The windows throughout are similar, but while those opening onto the veranda have shutters that open in two leaves, those of the windows in the external walls have four sections so that the higher ones can remain open when the lower ones are closed. The wooden louvers are adjustable, a wooden bar connected to a simple wooden device can be moved to either side, to open and close the shutters.

The rear veranda (to the west) is more recessed, and irregularly shaped, by which one room is provided with windows at both front and rear. Both this and another room at the rear, having access from the rear veranda, were convenient to the kitchen and suitable for use as a dining room.

External joinery is Indian teak (termite proof), explaining the thick, sturdy glazing bars of the French doors (as teak does not lend itself to fine detail). The internal joinery is cedar and painted. It is of a high standard, featuring many pairs of four paned, double doors (i.e.: 8 panelled doors) with matching jambs, timber fireplace surrounds of simple Georgian design, and deep skirting boards.

In one room is a fine marble fireplace of similar design. From the drawing room an east–west passage leads to the bedrooms on the northern side of the house, lined with cupboards, all of which have the same elegant doors.

OUTBUILDINGS A street of service buildings including kitchen, office cum library, laundry and privy, stables, coach house, servants' quarters and blacksmith shop, extended westward from the back of the house in a straight line. These are grouped along the continuation of the carriage drive, forming a street, which was terminated at a larger distance in the large barn (now demolished).

All the outbuildings are single storey, stuccoed brick structures with hipped roofs. Pilasters or projecting panels with arched, recessed windows as in the homestead are repeated in these buildings in a simpler way.

Nearest the house is the kitchen wing, joined to the house by a covered way. Part of the kitchen wing, with a door opening into the garden, was a library cum office, ideally placed, where the master of the house could see one and all - servants, clients or his sporting friends, without disturbing his wife's domestic arrangements.

Next to the west is the stables has pilasters on both sides of its central doors, to strengthen the walls. It has a hipped roof.

A small cottage just beyond the range of stables is similar in style, and these buildings form the main nucleus of the establishment.

Some of the humbler outbuildings, brick walls are only lime-washed also requiring re-application at regular intervals.

The coach house and stables were used for horses until quite recently (1998) and remnants of additional horse stalls are still evident at the back (south-eastern) side, with a row of tumbledown brick walls to the east indicating early stable outbuildings for tackle etc.

The Blacksmith's shop collapsed in a storm in 1940, but is able to be reconstructed (opinion, Lucas, 1982).

Last (western) outbuilding, the bush timber framed machinery shed, is little changed from its original use, and its wooden shingles are clearly visible under the corrugated iron roof. Some other buildings remain, now in disrepair, and many more must have once stood to house servants of all kinds, stock men, blacksmiths, gardeners, house servants etc.

=== Condition ===
As at 6 August 2002, 1983 fire briefly engulfed some of the exposed timbers of the Blue Room the eastern counterpart of the collapsed blacksmith's shop.

(1991) The garden is maintained in fair condition, although the entrance drive is now seldom used and deteriorating and the carriage loop is grassed over. The garden is in urgent need of protection by a large curtilage from unsympathetic development of the surrounding subdivided land. A conservation order has been applied only to the land under the same ownership as the house and is completely unrealistic if the garden and siting is to be protected. An inappropriate chicken shed has been sited beneath the house destroying the view from the entrance gates over the paddocks up to the house

(1998) Original wooden shingles on roof are well preserved below later corrugated iron roofs on the homestead and outbuildings.

Brick drains are clearly visible as first built around the homestead. Convict made bricks (from clay on the estate) are in evidence in all buildings, particularly where rising damp means stucco is flaking off external walls, revealing the bricks below.

Some of the humbler outbuildings, brick walls are only lime-washed also requiring re-application at regular intervals.

The coach house and stables were used for horses until quite recently (1998) and remnants of additional horse stalls are still evident at the back (south-eastern) side, with a row of tumbledown brick walls to the east indicating early stable outbuildings for tackle etc.

Blacksmith's shop collapsed in a storm in 1940, but is able to be reconstructed (opinion, Lucas, 1982).

Last (western) outbuilding, the bush timber framed machinery shed, is little changed from its original use, and its wooden shingles are clearly visible under the corrugated iron roof.

Garden (1998) is somewhat overgrown, but retains evidence of much of the original design, including a carriage loop in front (east) of the house, and a small carriage drive.

The bunya pine avenue up the driveway from the east to the house/carriage loop remains, with African olives seeding underneath the bunya pines. The huge Moreton Bay figs at the house area entry gates at the western end of the driveway avenue remain, and have grown so large they preclude vehicular entry into the carriage loop/ garden.

More recent development on adjoining lots, unsympathetic to Horsley, has caused the planting of trees and shrubs to obscure them, but these plantings are exotics, in character with much of the rest of the garden.

Mrs Kerfoot maintains a central bed of flowers and shrubs (e.g.: Yucca gloriosa) along the eastern and southern aspects of the house, which are in keeping with the historic atmosphere.

Substantially intact core of a colonial farm estatea

=== Modifications and dates ===
- 1831 Lt. & Mrs George Weston (née Johnston) take up 2000 acre property
- 1832 Homestead built together with major outbuildings (kitchen, stables, blacksmith's shop and barn) to its west.
- Main driveway from front gates was lined with bunya pines (from 1890s photographs of trees they were possibly planted by 1860s/70s) terminating in two Moreton Bay figs, where it reached the crest of the hill on which the carriage loop, house and outbuildings stood. Circular carriage loop and shrubbery laid out in front (east) of house. Later a small carriage drive was laid out (along what is now the north and west site boundaries), and a planted maze.
- Entrance door was originally on the western side, opening into a small hall, which has now been converted to other uses.
- During Blanche's lifetime, there had been a number of changes to the package of land comprising Horsley and smaller adjoining grants, which had become the property of other Johnston family members or been used to negotiate exchanges with Weston land elsewhere.
- 1888 Upper Nepean Water Supply completed, traversing the east of Horsley (Sydney Water Supply tunnel under Cecil Hills to south, and canal north to Prospect Reservoir).
- 1906 Blanches' widowed daughter Alice Smart successfully applied to have all the land parcels brought together under the one certificate of title, making her the owner of 2045 acres, by then traversed to the east by a section of the Sydney Water Supply Canal to Prospect Reservoir.
- In 1924 the estate was subdivided into 20 & 40 acre holdings, with approximately 65 acres including the homestead remaining in the possession of Miss Julia Perry, a Weston descendant.
- 1930 First subdivision of site into 20 & 40 acre holdings. Miss Perry purchases homestead and major outbuildings on 65 acres.
- 1939 Frederic Moffitt purchases site (January), occupies in May. Barn (which was to the west of the house and at that end of the "street" of outbuildings) was demolished. A 1939 subdivision plan listed 249 blocks for sale.
- 1940 Western half of the Blacksmith's shop collapsed in a storm, (but is able to be reconstructed).
- 1957 Two 5 acre blocks surveyed for possible sale. 5 acres was sold in 1959.
- 1960 5 acres sold reducing site to 60 acres.
- 1966 Mrs Moffitt dies and property inherited by the three remaining daughters. Helen Kerfoot, who had been living at Horsley with her mother for some years, continued to occupy the homestead portion, now with 12 acres.
- 1969 Property surveyed and new subdivision laid out.
- 1972 Sale of new subdivisions. Site reduced to 12 acres (4.45 hectares) but still included homestead, major outbuildings, driveway and most important tree plantings. New rear access to site provided via Jamison Close, also servicing new subdivisions.

Losses included:

- the pond, a small dam surrounded by trees immediately to the south of the front gates, and a favourite haunt of birds;
- the orchard on the southern slopes below the homestead and a small vineyard, originally with its own winepress, to the north;
- the cottage originally used by Mrs George Weston as a school for children on the property;
- the site of the original barn built over by a new residence.
- 1975–76 National Estate Program funding $5000 to restore stables and outbuildings, by Clive Lucas, also responsible for restoration works to homestead (earlier).
- 1982 Site is ringed by new housing development built on the 1972 subdivisions. A poultry shed has been built adjacent to the eastern boundary. New developments insensitive in form and siting, impinge on the major views of the homestead from the east and south-east approached along the Horsley Drive.

=== Further information ===
A related place is Horsley near Dapto (Wollongong), which was a grant c. 1818/19 to George Weston's elder brother, William Francis Weston, known as "Mr Johnston's Meadow". William Francis Weston died in 1826 leaving a widow and five small children, and it is possible George Weston came to Australia to advise and help his sister in law, Elizabeth around this time.

== Heritage listing ==
As at 7 August 2002, A substantially intact core of a colonial farm estate with its original 1830s bungalow, outbuildings, plantings, layout and entry within a remnant rural landscape setting which is now rare in the Fairfield LGA and on the Cumberland Plain. Horsley is integral to the history of Fairfield and the history of New South Wales, from its initial granting to Colonel Johnston as reward for his role in suppressing the Castle Hill rebellion. It has been associated with major elements in the colony's development, particularly the pastoral and racing industries, and trade with India.

Horsley makes a major contribution to the local townscape through its visual prominence, size and character, for instance its prominent bunya pine avenue climbing the hill to the house is similar in effect to those of Bella Vista Farm, Seven Hills, and Winbourne, Mulgoa. It retains some important traditional views to features beyond the estate.

The place has individual components of heritage significance, e.g.:

- the homestead as a rare (perhaps unique) surviving early Australian version of an Indian Bungalow style residence;
- its outbuildings both individually and as a "street" which is rare;
- its early plantings such as the prominent bunya pine (Araucaria bidwillii) entry avenue;
- the garden as a substantially intact 19th century landscape, with carriage loop, garden beds and early plantings; and
- for its unusual individual plants such as the Kei apple (Carissa grandiflora).

The place has important associations with various notable people - Colonel George Johnston, Governor King, the Weston family), and as a celebrated influence on the major colonial revival movement in architecture in the 1920s and 1930s, through architect William Hardy Wilson (Macquarie Cottage, Pymble; Eryldene, Gordon; Purulia, Wahroonga; Tiana (old name, no longer used, Cronulla) and others .

The place has considerable capacity to demonstrate development of the estate from its initial phase to the present, and is of considerable scientific interest on account of its archaeological research potential.

A colonial garden of major historic and aesthetic importance. An intact mid-19th century gardenesque style garden whose layout and planting splendidly complement the siting of the house. It is one of the finest landscapes in NSW despite the loss of some minor planting and detail. It is a garden whose importance relies on its layout (driveway up a hill to the house, carriage loop etc.) and the impact of its large scale planting (African olives, bunya pine avenue up driveway etc.). A large curtilage is essential. These (Cowpasture gardens including Horsley) were NSW's major contribution to gardening, and were the first gardens in NSW to attract the 20th century artist's and the historican's attention (National Trust (NSW), 1981)

The Horsley complex is historically significant as an unusually intact example of a self-contained country estate of the early nineteenth century and for its associations with the prominent early Johnston family. It has architectural significance for demonstrating many of the characteristic features of Old Colonial Regency style and the links with the architecture of British India of the same period. The garden is historically significant in its own right.

Horsley is the only Australian colonial house that can be directly related to Ango-Indian architecture. Not only the design, but also details and even certain fittings like the folding casement doors, and louvred jhilmils (of teak) came from India.

Also significant is the siting of the house and its outbuildings. Horsley can claim to be the only colonial homestead in NSW to have what amounts to a village street of outbuildings in close proximity to the house.

It is also significant for the influence it had on the colonial revival school of architects in the 20th century, following the publication in 1924 of Hardy Wilson's "Old Colonial Architecture of NSW & Tasmania". Wilson named it his favourite house and its influence can be seen in his work and that of his contemporaries. Even the architect, C. Bruce Dellit, though not of the colonial revival school, can be said to have been inspired by Horsley in his country house, Karoo at Meadow Flat, built in c.1935

Horsley is unique in that the house and outbuildings have been designed as an entity...the strong sense of style points to an architect... On this point there is no documentary evidence, but the tomb of the original owner, Colonel Johnston, who died in 1823, was designed by Francis Greenway

Horsley complex was listed on the New South Wales State Heritage Register on 2 April 1999.
