= Widemere Quarry railway line =

Former railway line in Sydney, New South Wales, Australia

- The light rail line at The Crescent, Fairfield

Overview
- Other name: The Widemere line
- Status: Demolished
- Owner: Sydney and Suburban Blue Metal Company
- Termini: Fairfield railway station; Pemulwuy (formerly Prospect)

History
- Opened: October 1925
- Closed: 2 June 1945

Technical
- Line length: 8.3 km (5.2 mi)
- Track gauge: 61 cm (2 ft)
- Highest elevation: 50 m (160 ft)

The Widemere Quarry railway line was a private railway line that served the Widemere Quarry in Sydney, New South Wales, Australia. Opened in October 1925 and demolished in June 1945, the industrial railway ran from Fairfield to what is now Pemulwuy, east of Prospect Reservoir, in Prospect Hill. As the line ran primarily along streets, future urban development removed all vestiges of it. The track was mostly placed on the northern alignment of The Horsley Drive across Smithfield to Dublin Street.

== History ==
The Widemere line was one of New South Wales' numerous privately owned quarry lines. Situated at the southern end of Prospect Hill, the Widemere Quarry was one of the four main quarries at Prospect Hill where it featured igneous rocks, and bluestone was quarried at the area for over a century. In 1901, a new excavation was launched by the Emu Gravel Company at the northern part of Prospect Hill, which was successful and thereafter the Widemere Quarry was launched in 1924 by the Sydney and Suburban Blue Medal Co Ltd on Prospect Hill southside. In 1924, the Sydney and Suburban Blue Metal Quarries began to construct the Widemere Quarry Line, a narrow gauge railway line, to connect the Booth mine (owned by the Booth brothers James and John) with the Main Southern Line at Fairfield railway station to the company's quarry on the southern part of Prospect Hill.

When the railway line was established in October 1925, the company did not possess a locomotive engine, while the New South Wales Government Railways had sustained a service. In 1927, the company was loaned a 4-6-4 tank engine by the New South Wales Government Railways, and in that year the engine 0-6-0 was bought from the South Maitland Railway and converted to a tank engine, before being scrapped in 1934, and replaced by a 2-6-2. A narrow gauge (.690 m) line in the quarry had wagons that were loaded with bluestone (blue metal) and descended into the crusher, before they were placed aboard a conveyor belt that transported the metal to the containers packed onto wagons and taken to Fairfield. The railway line was discontinued on 2 June 1945 (and was sold) due to the scarcity of rolling stock, though motor lorries for the transport of blue metal were developed.

== Route ==
The railway running along The Horsley Drive (formerly Smithfield Street) and Dublin Street, Smithfield.

The light rail line commenced at the Fairfield station goods yard and followed a route alongside public roads. After leaving the station, it made a broad curve over The Crescent into Court Road, formerly Smithfield Street, and continued alongside The Horsley Drive, also formerly known as Smithfield Street, before crossing Cumberland Highway, then known as Liverpool Road, in Smithfield. Heading west, the line made a wide curve beyond the meadows opposite Smithfield Cemetery before entering Dublin Street in Smithfield West. Around the middle of Dublin Street, near Chifley Street, formerly Water Street, it turned northwest, crossing Gipps Street near Redfern Street. The railway then curved west across the paddocks, entering a shallow cutting before turning north and following the general alignment of Cordeaux Street and Hassall Street. It subsequently crossed the water supply pipelines before reaching Widemere Road, where it crossed Prospect Creek on a timber trestle bridge. The line terminated at a quarry in Prospect, where it served two loop sidings and a junction, just south of the Prospect dolerite intrusion.

Although the railway was constructed largely along public roads, Fairfield City Council supported the company's operations and incorporated a footpath along the present-day The Horsley Drive, then Smithfield Street, to accommodate both pedestrians and steam locomotives. The line presented several engineering challenges, including a steep gradient along The Horsley Drive between Smithfield Road and Dublin Street, which resulted in trains frequently being divided into two sections. The railway also featured unusually sharp curves for a roadside railway, with some having a radius of only 160.9 metres, requiring trains to travel at low speeds when negotiating them.

== Impact ==
The steam trains passing the main street of Smithfield (what is now The Horsley Drive) were a feature of the town's everyday life and there was no record of any deaths, serious injuries or major derailments, although flares from the engines usually started grass fires and some residents had hoses to extinguish the fire. Those living proximate to the railway route found the trains to be a hassle, especially when the black smoke from the steam trains became an ongoing problem for the clotheslines at Smithfield, where residents brought their laundry off the clotheslines when a train passed by to evade the soot.

Moreover, Smithfield residents usually had to move their parked horses and carriages out of the train's line. The trains were also known to frighten the horses and cows in the pastures, and as well as visitors who were not aware of the railway line. Customers at the Victoria Hotel were told to move their carriages and carts off the rail. Despite the nuisances, residents still tolerated the railway because the trains ran infrequently and were rarely involved in any serious incidents. Children were often seen jumping on the moving wagons and adults frequently hitched a ride on the trains to get to Fairfield by dangling on the sides of the mineral wagon.

In the years after its closing, the railway line crossing The Crescent at Fairfield was still observable, but then it was gradually concealed after land development and was consequently buried beneath road bitumen. In Smithfield, at the Hassall Street-Widemere Road zone, residue of the embankments and wood trestles were perceivable until land and nature reclamation obscured any traces of them. Nonetheless, there are some remains of the line near Widemere Road and Prospect Creek around 280 metres (920 ft) south from the Widemere Recycling Facility (Boral), which have a historical significance.
