= Nan Hunt =

Australian children's writer

- Born: Nancy Louise Ray; 16 September 1918; Bathurst, New South Wales, Australia
- Died: 4 October 2015 (aged 97); Bathurst, New South Wales, Australia
- Occupation: Children's writer
- Writing career
- Notable works: Whistle Up the Chimney (1981); A Rabbit Named Harris (1987)
- Notable awards: Ethel Turner Prize for Young People's Literature (1982, 1988)

Nan Hunt (1918–2015) was an Australian children's writer who also wrote as N. L. Ray. She was a two-time winner of the Ethel Turner Prize for Young People's Literature.

== Life and career ==
Nancy Louise Ray was born on 16 September 1918 and grew up in Bathurst, New South Wales. Educated at Bathurst High School, she contributed stories to her school newspaper and also to The Sun. From 1935 to 1943 she did office work in a Bathurst department store. In 1943, she enlisted in the WAAF and served in Melbourne in clerical roles until 1946, when she moved to Sydney, where she worked as a secretary until her marriage to Walter Gibbs Hunt in 1968.

She contributed to the NSW School Magazine from 1963 and was encouraged by its editor, Patricia Wrightson, to write a novel, the first of many.

Hunt won the Ethel Turner Prize for Young People's Literature at the New South Wales Premier's Literature Awards twice, firstly in 1982 for Whistle Up the Chimney, illustrated by Craig Smith, and then in 1988 for A Rabbit Named Harris, illustrated by Betina Ogden. Whistle Up the Chimney was also commended in the 1982 Children's Picture Book of the Year awards, the judges commenting that "text itself is excellent in style, with good use of language and an infectious sense of fun".

== Selected works ==
=== As Nan Hunt ===
- Whistle Up the Chimney, illustrated by Craig Smith (1981)
- A Rabbit Named Harris, illustrated by Betina Ogden (1987)
- Never Tomorrow (1989)
- The Dove Tree, illustrated by Alison Kubbos (1991)

=== As N. L. Ray ===
- There Was This Man Running... (1979)
- Nightmare to Nowhere (1980)

== Death and legacy ==
Hunt died in Bathurst, New South Wales on 4 October 2015. She was predeceased by her husband in 1975.

Her papers, including manuscripts and correspondence, are held in the Lu Rees Archives at the University of Canberra.
