= The Horsley Drive =

Road in Sydney, Australia

The Horsley Drive New South Wales
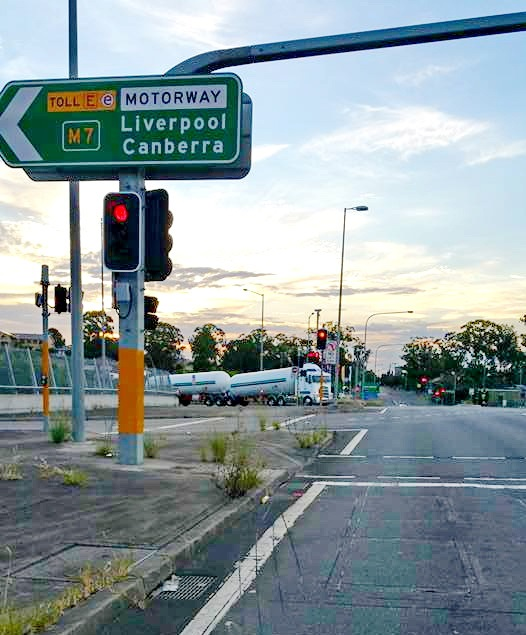
- The Horsley Drive, near Westlink M7 exit, in Horsley Park
- Coordinates: 33.841131°S 150.844676°E (West end); 33.889077°S 150.969735°E (East end)

General information
- Type: Road
- Length: 14.7 km (9.1 mi)
- Gazetted: March 1970

Major junctions
- West end: Arundel Road; Horsley Park, Sydney
- Wallgrove Road; Westlink M7; Cumberland Highway
- East end: Hume Highway; Carramar, Sydney

Location(s)
- Major suburbs: Horsley Park, Bossley Park, Wetherill Park, Smithfield, Fairfield, Fairfield East, Carramar, Villawood

The Horsley Drive is a 13-kilometre (8.1 mi) urban road located in the local government area of the City of Fairfield in Greater Western Sydney, New South Wales, Australia. The road begins at the Hume Highway in Carramar and terminates at Arundel Road in Horsley Park, Sydney.

== Route ==
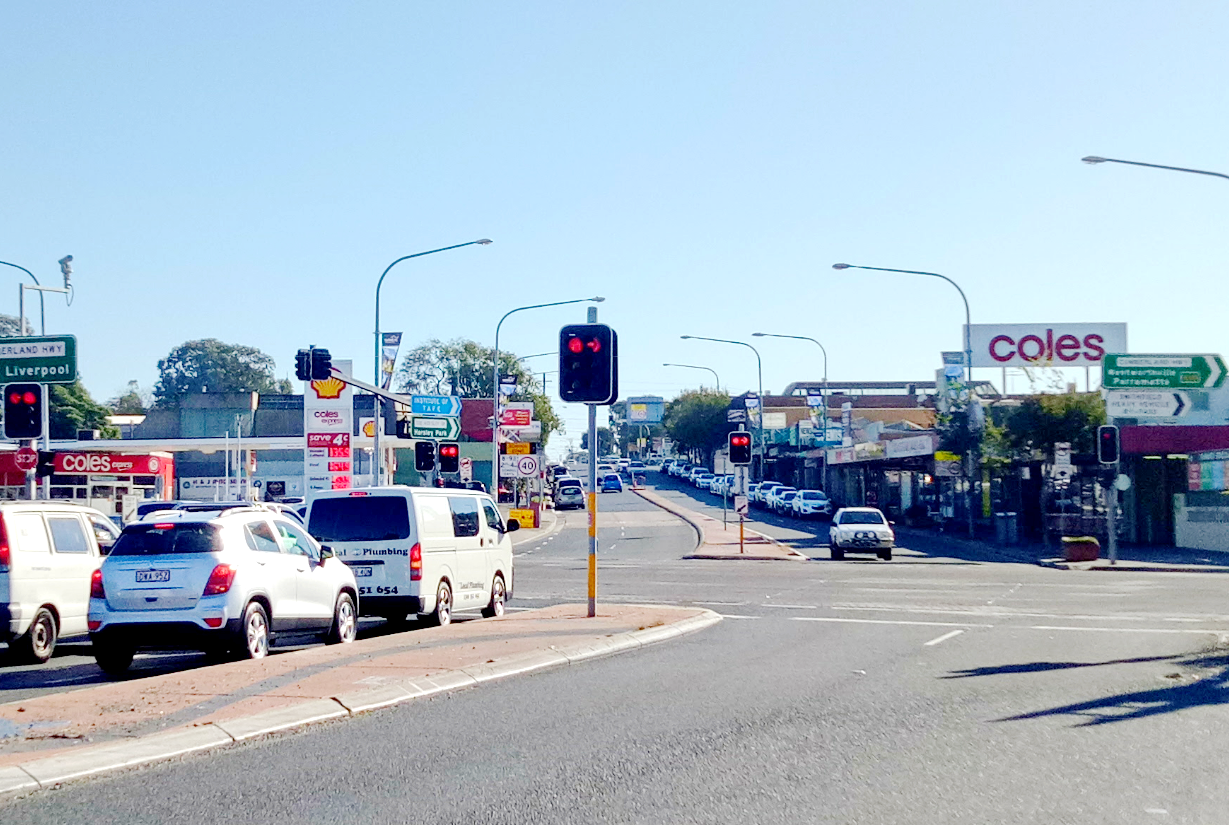
The Horsley Drive as it goes through Smithfield town centre, intersecting Cumberland Highway

The Horsley Drive commences at the intersection with the Hume Highway in Carramar. It heads in a northwesterly direction through Fairfield, to cross the Cumberland Highway in Smithfield. It continues westward through the Wetherill Park industrial area as a two-lane, single-carriageway road, widening to a four-lane dual carriageway at Lily St before reverting to a single carriageway at the northern intersection of its two intersections with Cowpasture Road.

It then runs westward to an interchange with Westlink M7 and an at-grade intersection with Wallgrove Road before continuing westward as a rural two-lane road to terminate at Arundel Road at the entrance to the grounds of Horsley House (part of the Western Sydney Parklands) in Horsley Park.

There are three main pedestrian and cycle access points to The Horsley Drive: at the intersections with Westlink M7, Ferrers Road, and the Upper Canal System. Recreational areas situated on the road include Wetherill Park Nature Reserve and several picnic spots in Western Sydney Parklands such as Western Sydney Regional Park. Educational facilities such as a TAFE college, Fairfield High School and Fairfield Public School are also situated on the road.

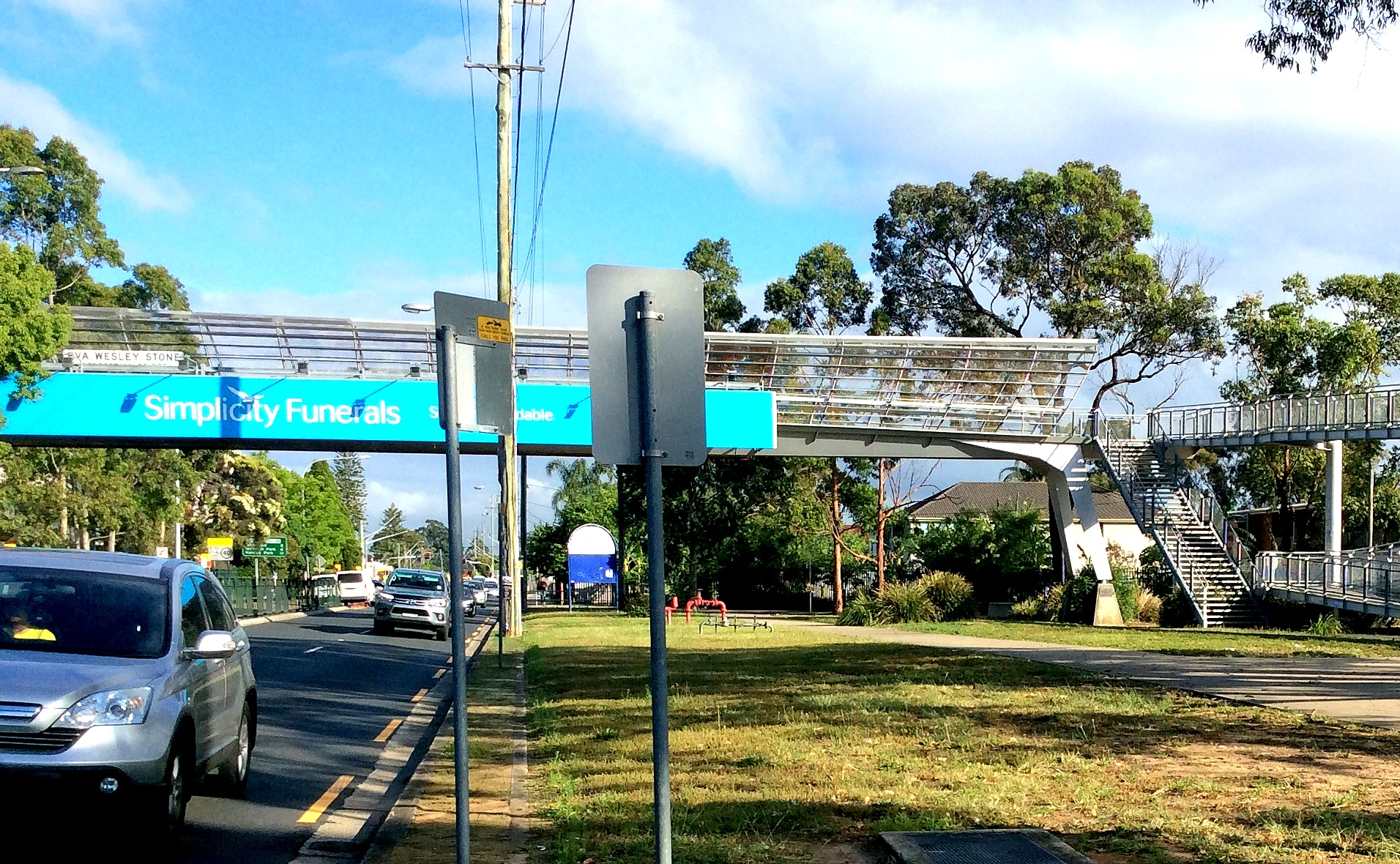
Eva Wesley Stone Pedestrian Bridge

Horsley Park was originally part of Colonel George Johnston's 2,000-acre (8.1 km^{2}) property "Kings Gift". After his death in 1823 it passed to his daughter Blanche, who in 1829 married Major George Nicholas Weston. He built an Indian colonial style homestead on the property and named it "Horsley" after his birthplace in Surrey, England.

== History ==
Like many of Sydney's arterial roads, The Horsley Drive is an amalgamation of a number of pre-existing roads, with later sections built to create a continuous route under one name. In the case of The Horsley Drive, the section from the Hume Highway to Hanson St was named Carrington St, the section from the Granville-Cabramatta railway (at the former level crossing adjacent to Fairfield station) to Wetherill Street was named "Smithfield Street"., and the section from Daniel Street to Cowpasture Road was named Whinstanes Road.

During the 1950s these roads were renamed The Horsley Drive, although the section of Smithfield St from the railway to Nelson St retained its name, but when the railway overpass was opened it was renamed Court Road.

To create a continuous route the section from Hanson St to Nelson St was opened in 1961. This included the overpass of the railway and Prospect Creek, and replaced the former route via Gordon and Vine Streets and a level crossing. (In the 1970s the overpass was widened to four lanes and the interchange with Fairfield Street built.) A connection from Smithfield St where Mala St is now located to Daniel St where Haywood Close is now located was built to provide a continuous route.

Between 1924 and its closure in 1945, the Widemere Quarry Line, which was connected to the Main Southern Line at Fairfield railway station, ran along Smithfield Street.

Due to rapid population growth in the area after World War 2, Fairfield Hospital was opened on The Horsley Drive at Mitchell Street in Fairfield in September 1956 until it was relocated in 1988 to Wetherill Park.

== Road numbering ==
The passing of the Main Roads Act of 1924 through the Parliament of New South Wales provided for the declaration of Main Roads, roads partially funded by the State government through the Main Roads Board (MRB). With the subsequent passing of the Main Roads (Amendment) Act of 1929 to provide for additional declarations of State Highways and Trunk Roads, the Department of Main Roads (having succeeded the MRB in 1932) declared Main Road 609 along the eastern half of The Horsley Drive, from the intersection with Hume Highway in Carramar to the intersection with Liverpool Road (today Cumberland Highway) in Smithfield, on 25 March 1970.

This was extended west along the western half of The Horsley Drive from Smithfield to the intersection with Wallgrove Road in Horsley Park on 15 February 1991. It was later re-aligned to run along Victoria and Elizabeth Streets through Smithfield and Wetherill Park respectively, instead of The Horsley Drive, on 12 March 2010. The passing of the Roads Act of 1993 updated road classifications and the way they could be declared within New South Wales. Under this act, The Horsley Drive retains its declaration as part of Main Road 609.

On 15 March 2002, a A$2 million pedestrian bridge over The Horsley Drive was opened to link Fairfield High School and Fairfield Public School on the opposite side. The bridge was named the Eva Wesley Stone Pedestrian Bridge, after Eva Wesley Stone (1894–2001), who was Fairfield's oldest resident.

== Major intersections ==
The Horsley Drive is entirely contained within the Fairfield City Council local government area.

Location	km	mi	Destinations	Notes
Horsley Park	0.0	0.0	Arundel Road – Horsley Park	Western terminus of road at entranceway to Horsley Home
Horsley Park	0.8	0.50	Wallgrove Road – Minchinbury, Cecil Hills	
Horsley Park	1.0	0.62	Westlink M7 (M7) – Dean Park, Bella Vista, Prestons	Diamond interchange
Horsley Park	2.5	1.6	Ferrars Road – Eastern Creek	
Wetherill Park–Abbotsbury–Bossley Park tripoint	3.5	2.2	Cowpasture Road – Hinchinbrook, Horningsea Park	Roundabout
Smithfield	9.5	5.9	Smithfield Road (Cumberland Highway) (A28) – Wahroonga, Pennant Hills, Parramatta, Liverpool	
Fairfield	12.3	7.6	Old Main South railway line	
Carramar–Fairfield East–Villawood tripoint	13.9	8.6	Main Southern railway line	
Carramar–Villawood–Lansdowne tripoint	14.7	9.1	Hume Highway (A22) – Summer Hill, Liverpool	Eastern terminus of road
1.000 mi = 1.609 km; 1.000 km = 0.621 mi: Tolled; Route transition
