= Kelso High Campus =

Location
- Kelso, Central West, New South Wales; Australia; 33°24′45″S 149°36′51″E

Information
- Type: Government-funded co-educational comprehensive secondary day school campus
- Motto: Truth, Courtesy, Co-Operation
- Established: 1976; 50 years ago (as Kelso High School)
- School district: Bathurst; Rural South and West
- Educational authority: NSW Department of Education
- Teaching staff: 62.9 FTE (2018)
- Years: 7–12
- Enrolment: 759 (2018)
- Campus: Regional
- Colours: Green, black, white
- Website: kelso-h.schools.nsw.gov.au

The Kelso High Campus (abbreviated as KHC) of Denison College of Secondary Education is a government-funded co-educational comprehensive secondary day school campus, located in Kelso, in the Central West region of New South Wales, Australia.

Established in 1976 as Kelso High School, the school amalgamated with Bathurst High School in 2007 to form Denison College of Secondary Education. In 2018 Kelso High Campus enrolled approximately 760 students from Year 7 to Year 12, of whom approximately 15 percent identified as Indigenous Australians and six percent were from a language background other than English. The campus is operated by the NSW Department of Education; and the Campus Principal is Michael Sloan.

== History ==
Kelso High was established on 27 January 1976 in Waterworks Lane, Gormans Hill, Bathurst. It commenced with a teaching staff of 16, an ancillary staff of 8 and a student enrolment of 236 divided almost equally between Year 7 and Year 8. The school moved to its present site in 1978 opening with a "state-of-the-art" flexible designed building that would be destroyed by a fire. Despite the damage it still remains on this site.

2005 Fire

On 19 August 2005, a powerpoint behind a cupboard had an electrical fault causing a massive fire to burn the building, spreading fast with winds and connected corridors causing the fire to spread quickly. Over 100 firefighters battled for around 4 hours with brigades called from throughout New South Wales. About 90% of the complex had been destroyed including offices, library books, science labs, most of the classrooms and several HSC works. Despite the effort to keep the surviving buildings they would be demolished for the new facilities.

Rebuild

The school was housed in demountable buildings while a new school was being built. The new buildings were finished by the end of 2007, three months ahead of schedule. Students started the 2008 school year in the new facilities.

=== Denison College of Secondary Education ===
The 2005 fire which destroyed Kelso High led to the formation of Denison College of Secondary Education. The college was created to share curriculum, facilities and staff between Kelso and Bathurst High campuses in order to enhance student choice.

== Notable alumni ==
- Gavin Coles – Professional Golfer
- Janelle Lindsay – Paralympic cyclist
- Toireasa Gallagher – Paralympic cyclist
- Ashley Franks – Associate professor, La Trobe University
- George Rose – Professional rugby league player

== See also ==
- List of government schools in New South Wales
- Education in Australia
