= Fairfield Public School =

Public elementary school in Sydney, Australia

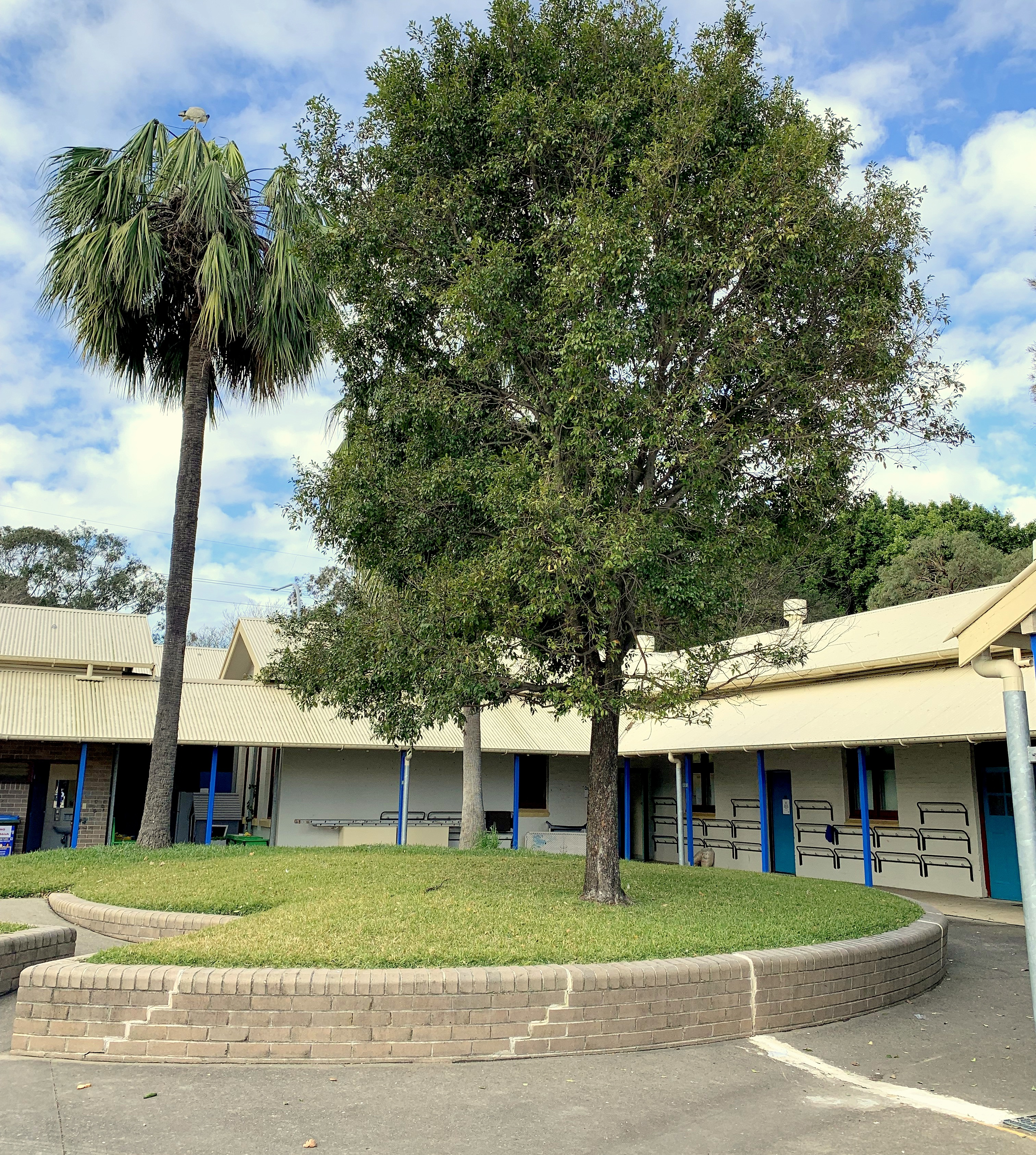
- Stage 2 classrooms (Block 2), near a garden bed

Location
- The Horsley Drive and Smart Street, Fairfield, New South Wales; Australia; 33°52′03″S 150°57′19″E

Information
- Type: Government-funded, co-educational, secondary, day school
- Motto: Learning Together
- Established: 1889; 137 years ago
- School district: Fairfield
- Educational authority: New South Wales Department of Education
- Principal: Ken Smith
- Teaching staff: 20
- Years: Kindergarten–6
- Enrollment: 437 (2023)
- Colours: Dark blue and sky blue
- Website: fairfield-p.schools.nsw.gov.au

Fairfield Public School is a government-funded, co-educational, primary day school, located in Fairfield, a western suburb of Sydney, New South Wales, Australia. Established in 1889 and opened by Sir Henry Parkes, the school caters for approximately 435 students from kindergarten to Year 6. The school is operated by the New South Wales Department of Education and it is opposite of Fairfield High School.

With 97% of the school's students being of a non-English speaking background, Fairfield Primary School is one of the most multicultural schools in Sydney. The motto, "Learning Together", represents the school's united partnerships and values. The school features a house system and has an official song titled 'Lift Up Your Voice'. In June 2014, Fairfield Public School celebrated 125 years of education where former New South Wales governor Marie Bashir, and as well as former principals, visited the school and participated in a special assembly; the school choir performed I Am Australian in Bashir's honour, and the school's drumming group played for her.

== History ==
=== 19th–20th century ===
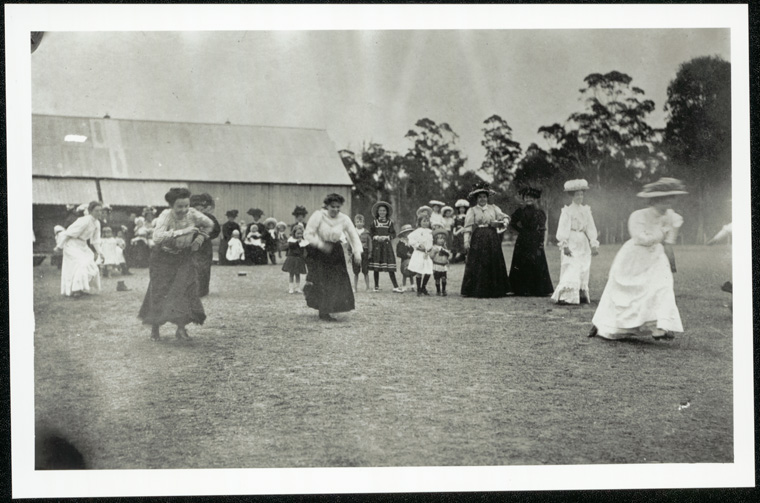
Teachers race at a picnic in the school, circa 1905

Fairfield Public School was established in 1889 following a campaign by local residents for the establishment of a public school in the district. The school began receiving children more than a month before its formal opening ceremony, which was held on Saturday, 23 February 1889 and conducted by former Premier of New South Wales Sir Henry Parkes. Parkes and Lady Parkes were met at Fairfield railway station by Alderman Stimson and David Dale, president of the Fairfield Progress Association, before being taken to the school. The schoolroom had been decorated with garlands of evergreens and flowers for the occasion, and the ceremony attracted a large gathering of parents and children.

The ceremony was presided over by Stimson. A pupil gave an address welcoming Parkes on behalf of the school's students, while Lady Parkes was presented with a flower bouquet. Stimson spoke about the local campaign for the establishment of the school and expressed the community's pleasure at Parkes, whom he described as one of the founders of the colony's public education system, attending to open it. In his opening address, Parkes discussed the development of public education in New South Wales and the principles of the Public Instruction Act 1880, describing Fairfield as an example of the colony's system of public schools. He emphasised the importance of access to elementary education regardless of social background and encouraged the pupils to take advantage of their education. At the time, the school had approximately 120 pupils enrolled and an average attendance of about 90. Parkes concluded the ceremony by formally declaring the school open; the proceedings ended with cheers for the visitors and the singing of the national anthem.

Parkes compared the lack of educational facilities of a quarter of a century prior with the system of government-funded education being finally constituted through Australia throughout the late 19th century, making it an extraordinary advantage over the children of former time periods or of those in other nations. Parkes also remarked to the students that they had a special privilege in attending this school, as they had their entire lives to gain from the teaching they received at that period. Mr Willis, the school's first headmaster, had his house within the school grounds (facing The Horsley Drive) in the late 1890s. In the late 1890s and early 1900s, the students were called to school each day to ring the solid iron school bell three times at 9am and again at 9:30 am. The school has organised sport picnics from as far back as the 1920s, with some events being notable enough to be reported in local newspapers like The Biz.

In 1958, Fairfield Public School had an enrolment of approximately 1,350 pupils, down from 1,400 the previous year. The Biz described it as having once been the second-largest primary school in New South Wales, but reported that its enrolment had declined as new schools opened in the surrounding area. Around 15 per cent of its pupils were described at the time as "New Australians". Jack Settler was headmaster, with A. Weichmann serving as deputy headmaster. By 1958, Fairfield Public School was one of the largest primary school in New South Wales, though enrolments in that year decreased from 1400 to 1350 students (despite an increase of enrolments in schools of the surrounding areas). In the 1950s, approximately 15% of the students were recent immigrants to Australia. Since the 1960s, classrooms have oftentimes been renovated through government-funded painting, with blue being the school's emblematic colour.

=== 21st century ===
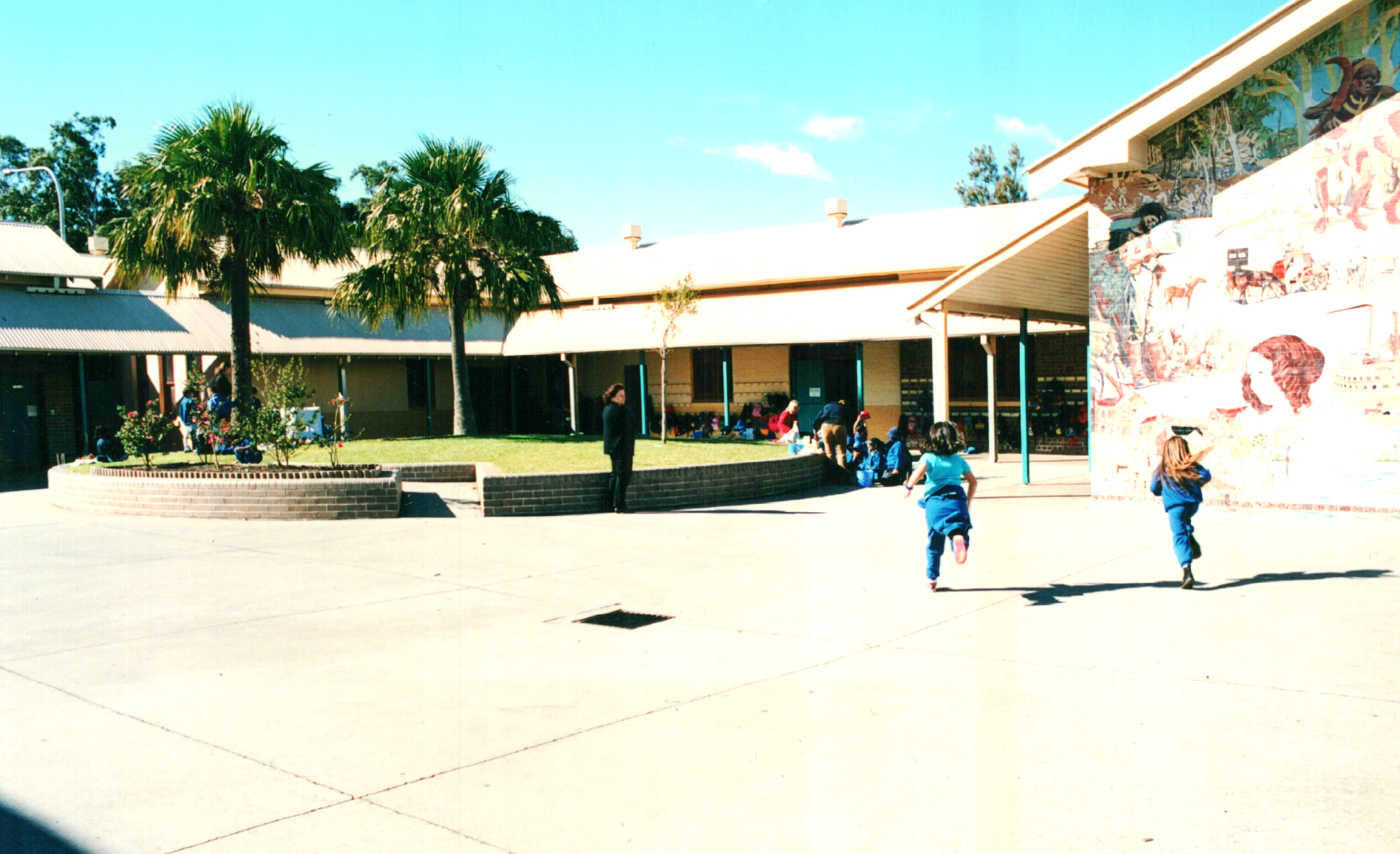
Block 2 in 2002

On 15 March 2002, a A$2 million pedestrian bridge over The Horsley Drive was opened to link the school with Fairfield High School on the opposite side. The bridge was named the Eva Wesley Stone Pedestrian Bridge, after Eva Wesley Stone (1894–2001), who was Fairfield's oldest resident and lived in Fairfield all her life, in addition to attending the school in the late 1890s/early 1900s.

By 2008, Fairfield Public School had an enrolment of 619 students and served a highly multilingual community, with around 90 per cent of students assessed in Years 3 and 5 coming from language backgrounds other than English. The school operated community-language programs in Arabic, Assyrian and Vietnamese, while English-language support formed a substantial component of its teaching program, with the equivalent of six ESL teaching positions. An ESL Program Review conducted that year recommended greater integration of newly arrived students and further development of ESL teaching and assessment across the school. The school also participated in the Schools as Community Centres and Priority Schools programs, which supported links between the school, families and the wider community, as well as literacy, numeracy and student participation. Supported playgroups included Assyrian, Arabic, Sudanese and Cambodian families. More than 200 students participated in the school's Reading is RAD holiday reading program. The school's multicultural activities included a Multicultural Day involving students and parents, and in 2008 it commemorated 25 years of community-language education in New South Wales public schools. At the time, the school operated 27 classes and had the equivalent of approximately 43 teaching positions, including specialist ESL and community-language teachers. In sport, Fairfield Public School won the Lansdowne Zone Primary School Sports Association Champion School's Trophy in 2008 for the second consecutive year; its teams also won or shared premierships in soccer, Oztag and T-ball.

In 2014, principal David Smith decided to use the autotuned pop song Go! by Noise International for the school bell, because he thought it was a pleasant way to start lessons. (Note: The song features the vocals of Sharon Muscat from the Australian pop duo Sister2Sister.) In November 2016, Fairfield Public School had recorded the biggest increase of students in its Intensive English Centre. By 2016, refugee and English-language education had become a substantial component of the school's programs. An assistant principal was employed specifically to coordinate English as an additional language or dialect (EAL/D) and refugee programs, while staff participated in research and professional development concerning the education of newly arrived and refugee students. The school also worked with Mercy Connect and the St Vincent de Paul SPARK program to provide literacy, numeracy and social support to refugee students, and contributed to the organisation of the Fairfield/Liverpool Refugee Conference. The school began implementing Positive Behaviour for Learning in 2016, with consultation involving students, staff and parents; parent forums were conducted in both English and Arabic. Equity funding was also used to maintain smaller class sizes as part of the school's STARS model. In January 2017, over 200 families enrolled their children in the school, many of whom were recent refugees from overseas, including Syria – The new students received a pencil case, teddy bear and drink bottle.

By 2017, enrolment stood at 590 students, of whom 95 per cent were from language backgrounds other than English. Forty-eight languages were represented within the school community, with Arabic, Assyrian, Vietnamese, Bosnian and Tongan among the predominant groups. Refugee students accounted for 41 per cent of enrolments, including students who had experienced interrupted or limited prior schooling. The school's English as an additional language program (EAL/D) had been recognised for its approach to supporting students from non-English-speaking backgrounds. During this period, additional funding supported a breakfast club, technology programs and literacy and numeracy initiatives. In 2017, the school completed its first full year of implementing Positive Behaviour for Learning and held its first Aboriginal Community Forum. The Schools as Community Centres program also continued to provide support for families with children aged up to eight. In December that year, students from the school took part in the annual Christmas trolley run for the disadvantaged in Fairfield CBD, where students rode trolleys filled with food and were led by the school's drumming band to the Fairfield Uniting Church.

In January 2018, the school began to improve its indigenous education due to national population boom in school-aged Aboriginal children. In June 2018, the school's library picked up A$7,000 of new books from Dymocks, after Dymocks Children's Charities assisted the students to raise A$3,500 to help refill the school's library with 500 new books. In 2018, every new refugee student was given a "welcome pack" that featured a jump rope, colouring pencils, a colouring book and a tennis ball. By 2019, Fairfield Public School had 581 students, with 60 languages represented within the school community. Around 95 per cent of students were from language backgrounds other than English, while 40 per cent were from refugee backgrounds. Arabic, Assyrian, Vietnamese, Bosnian and Tongan were among the predominant language and cultural groups. The school maintained substantial EAL/D and refugee support programs, including specialist staff and support for newly arrived students.

During the COVID-19 pandemic in 2020, the school shifted much of its teaching and communication online during the lockdown, with Seesaw becoming a primary platform for delivering lessons, instructional videos and communication with families. Support for refugee and newly arrived students continued remotely, with staff contacting families regarding students' learning and wellbeing, assisted by Arabic-speaking staff. The closure of international borders also affected enrolments; the school had 569 students in 2020 and anticipated that enrolment would fall below 500 in 2021 for the first time in a decade.

== Demographics and statistics ==
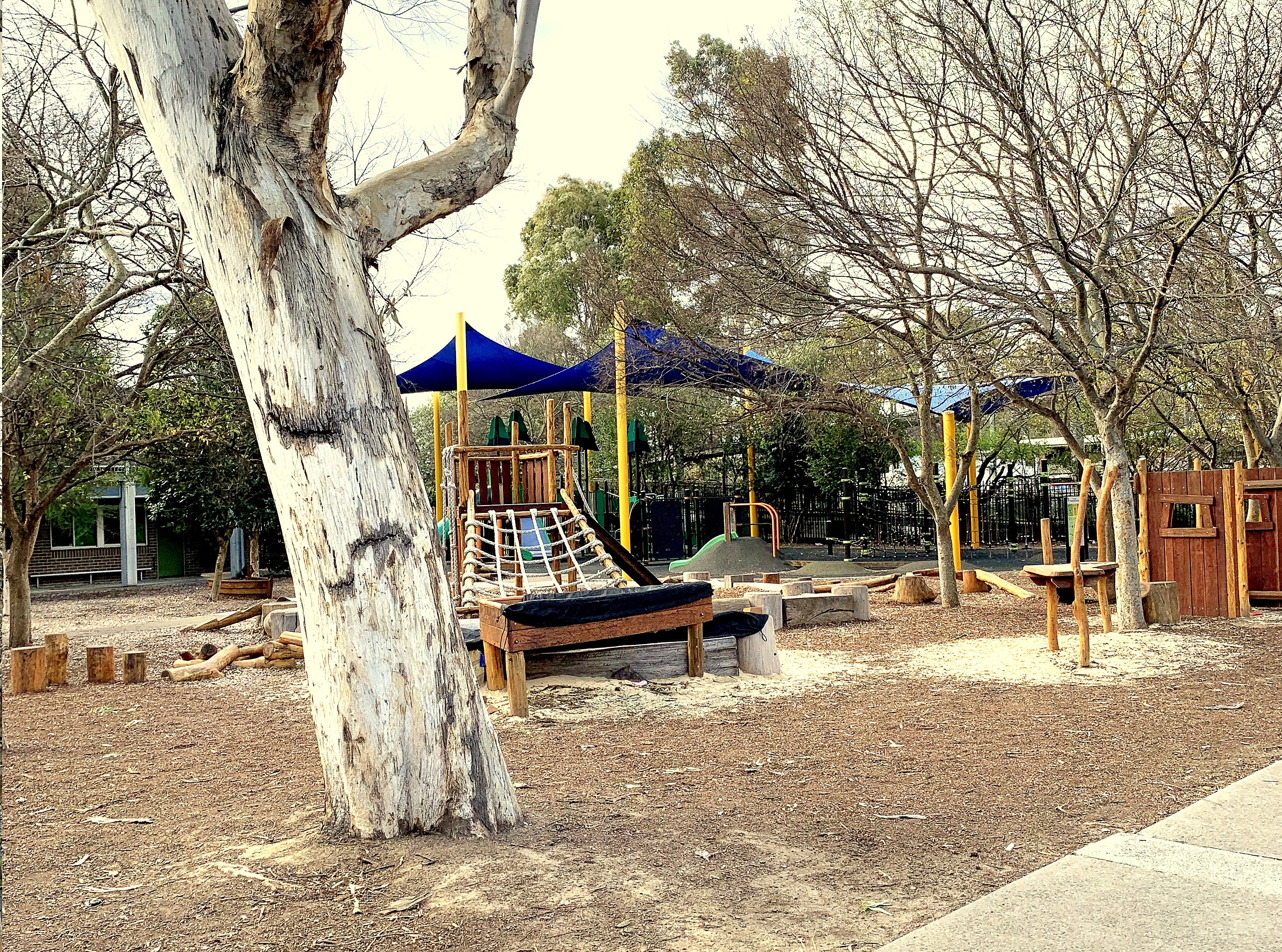
A playground near The Horsley Drive, which features swings and slides

Student population is transient; enrolment has decreased since 2020, with an enrolment of 503 students at the beginning of 2021, down from 565 at the end of 2020 and 617 students in 2015. In 2023, 437 students were enrolled, down from 462 students in 2022. As of 2023, the school has around 15 classroom teachers, 4 ESL teachers, 5 assistant principals, 4 administration support staff and 1 counsellor. The school's teaching staff features a blend of experienced and early-career teachers.

In 2023, the proportion of students attending school at least 90% of the time increased from 47.3% in 2022 to 57.0%, which was above both the Department of Education and similar school percentages. Though 29% of students attended school less than 85% of the time. 70% of students from kindergarten to year 2 have achieved education-determined targets affiliated with the national literacy progression. In 2023, a minimum of 64.7% of students accomplished at or above expected growth in NAPLAN reading and 59.8% attained at or above in expected growth in NAPLAN numeracy.

=== Diversity ===
In 2011, with 95% of its students being of non-English speaking background, (Note: The percentages fluctuate on a decadal basis – 95% were of foreign-language background from the late 2010s to early 2020s. In the early 2010s, 97% were of non-English background.) the school was just behind Bankstown Public School (99%) and Liverpool Public School (98%), tying with Cabramatta Public School (96%), for having students of foreign-language background. 40% of the school's enrolments are from a refugee background.

The students are from multicultural backgrounds, with 95% of the students speaking languages other than English; 60 languages are represented within the school community, including Arabic, Sureth (Assyrian/Chaldean Neo-Aramaic), Hindi, Dari, Bosnian, Tongan, Khmer, and Vietnamese constituting the largest language groups as of 2023. Previously the children had been of Vietnamese, Bosnian and Afghan descent, though since 2018 most of them have been Syrian and Iraqi, with a few being of Karen and Iranian descent. In 2018, the students have mostly been from Bosnia, Vietnam, Cambodia, Iraq, Afghanistan and Syria, and of the 582 students registered about 240 of them were refugees (or have parents who are).

=== Welfare and trauma ===
Many of the school's refugee students have experienced trauma and poor education prior to immigrating, in addition to some who have had gaps in their education and others who have family members killed or lost in war. Some of the refugee students who first enrolled poor health such as vitamin D deficiency and poor dental care. Furthermore, many students are poor swimmers, having had little or no exposure to open water in their countries of origin, which can make the annual swimming carnival particularly challenging. Former deputy principal Kim Cootes stated that "nine out of ten kids will get into the pool and sink to the bottom".

According to the Sydney Morning Herald, the children "have seen more air raids and bombings than athletics carnivals or assemblies". In 2016, a student became distressed during a sausage barbecue after the smell of smoke reminded them of their school being bombed, illustrating the complexities of educating young refugees who have experienced psychological trauma.

According to staff observations, some students initially display good behaviour following enrolment but begin exhibiting behavioural issues after becoming more settled within the school environment. Race-related bullying has not been encountered in the school. Positive Behaviour for Learning (PBL) data indicated a slight increase in the proportion of students receiving the school's highest award for positive behaviour, rising from 78.6% in 2022 to 81.5% in 2023. In 2023, incidents (which includes bullying) decreased 48.35% from the 2022 baseline data.

=== Reception ===
Parent survey data showed that 89% of parents evaluated that the information received from the school was intelligibly transmitted and in plain language. In a parent survey, 88% of respondents agreed that they were promptly informed of behavioural concerns involving their child and that these issues were addressed respectfully.The most frequently proposed improvements included restoring library lessons and borrowing services, expanding sports programs, and providing more opportunities for student participation. In a 2023 survey including 86% of the staff, the results displayed increased positivity by staff in various areas compared to the 2022 results. A parent survey found that 75% of respondents used the Seesaw (Note: An educational platform built specifically to address the needs of elementary classrooms, which is used between students, teachers, and families.) platform to access information from the school or their child's teacher.

In 2014, according to the principal David Smith at that time, Fairfield Public School's biggest struggle was the students' poor English skills and the school's greatest obstacle was adapting to Fairfield's changing demographics. In 2018, the principal conceded that the school does not meet the national minimum standard when it comes to literacy and numeracy, but according to him this was justified because the students "never had schooling" since they arrived from a war-torn nation, and so they should not be compared to an English-speaking child born in Australia. In a 2016 news article by the Sydney Morning Herald, the school was described as "an unprepossessing primary school...with a concrete playground, too little grass, a canteen and the usual mix of demountable and legacy buildings", in addition to being "at Australia's front line in educating kids displaced by Islamic State".

== Facilities and programs ==
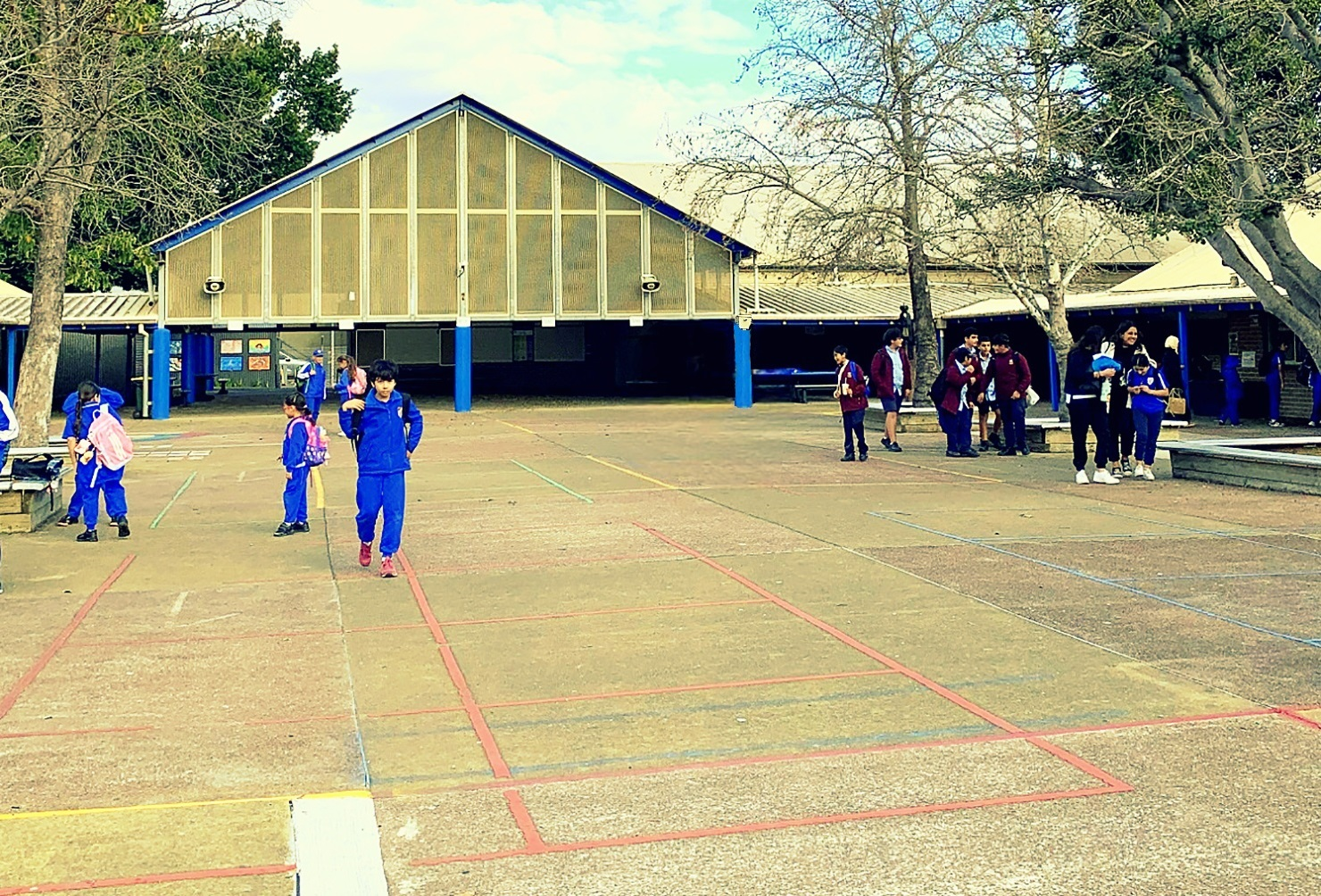
The COLA, with the canteen inside

The school has a COLA (Covered Outdoor Learning Area), which is a large pavilion-like structure, that protects students from the elements. Fairfield City Council has established a preschool on the school ground. The school's Community Centre assists community and supported playgroups, also parenting workshops and support. The school features a 'Scholastics Book Club' facility, and serves as locale for Weekend Community Language schools in Arabic, Vietnamese and Chinese, including Karate School and HIPPY ('Home Interaction Program for Parents and Youngsters'). The school offers students access to Breakfast Club, Homework Learning Clubs and After School Sport. Academic programs include Early Action for Success, Community Languages, community and multicultural events, creative arts opportunities, debating and several sporting activities.

The school has annual events such as 'Multicultural Day', 'Easter Hat Parade' and 'Book Parade'. Hats are part of the school uniform and are compulsory. The school's lunchtime is early (11am), because many students do not get breakfast at home due to the area's lower socioeconomics status. Kids who misbehave are submitted to the 'reflection room', which is not titled the "detention room" since the term might traumatise the refugee students, as some had previously been held in detention centres. The school gates are generally locked and all guests to the school need to be signed in before entering the grounds. During swimming lessons, students are assigned coloured wristbands based on their swimming ability. Students who successfully swim 25 metres may become eligible to compete at regional swimming carnivals.

=== Houses ===
The school features four houses that every child is allocated to once enrolled, with each house having its own theme colour. Family members are placed in the same house, since the house system is based on the child's surname. The four houses (listed below) are generally used in sports, with points being assigned for athletics, cross country and swimming events:

- Prospect (Blue)
- Hume (Red)
- Horsley (Yellow)
- Parkes (Green)

=== Partnerships ===
The school's partnerships with external agencies include, The Smith Family, STARTTS (Service for the Rehabilitation of Torture and Trauma Survivors), TAFE NSW Outreach, NSW Police, Community First Step, Woodville Alliance, NSW Refugee Health, OzHarvest, CORE (Care, Opportunity, Respect and Empowerment) Community Services, PARKS and Wellbeing Health Inreach Nurse, which are integrated into the school's sentiment to support the community's needs.

== Notable alumni ==
- Jelena Dokic – Australian/Serbian tennis player and commentator

== Gallery ==
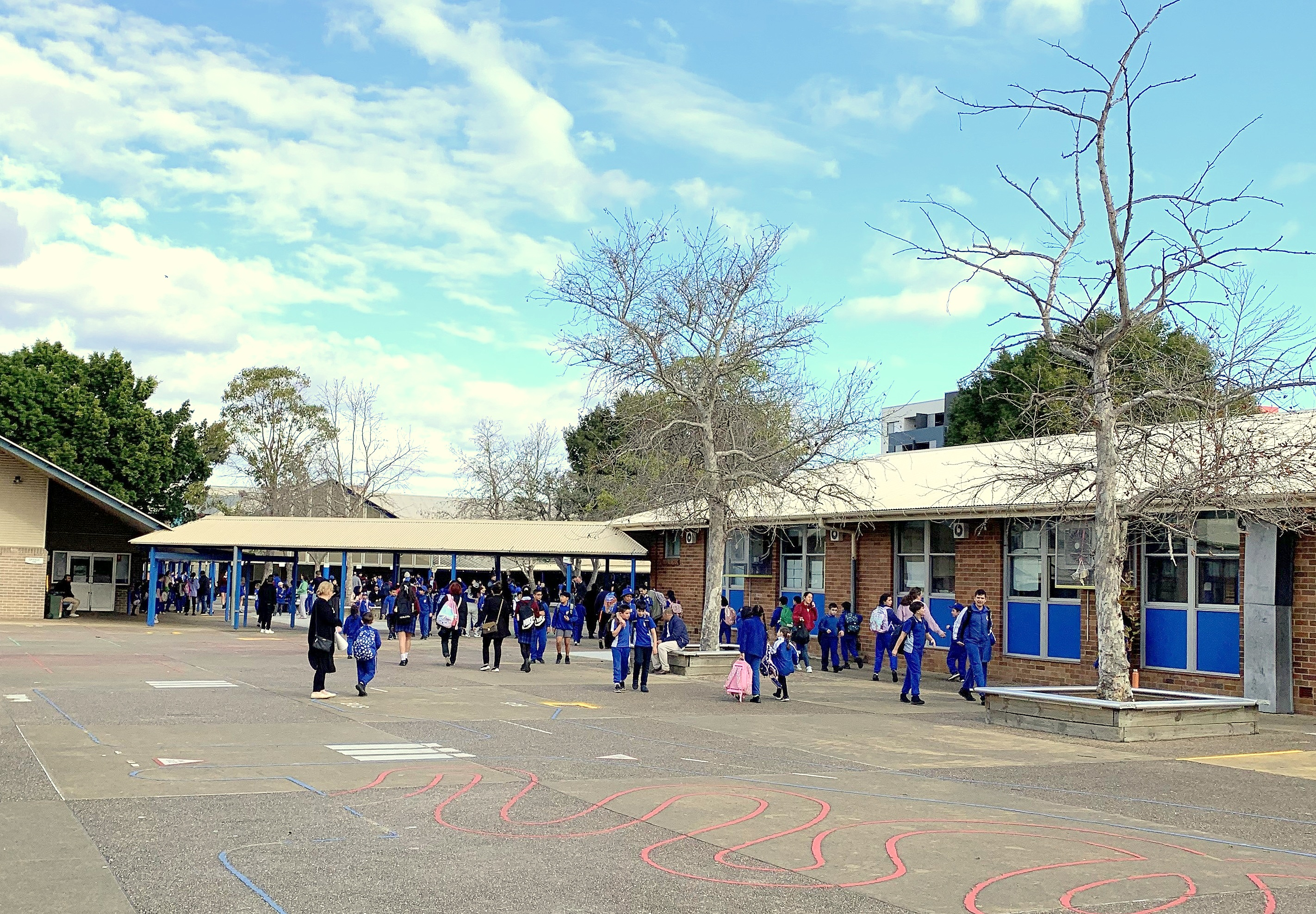
One of the main playgrounds

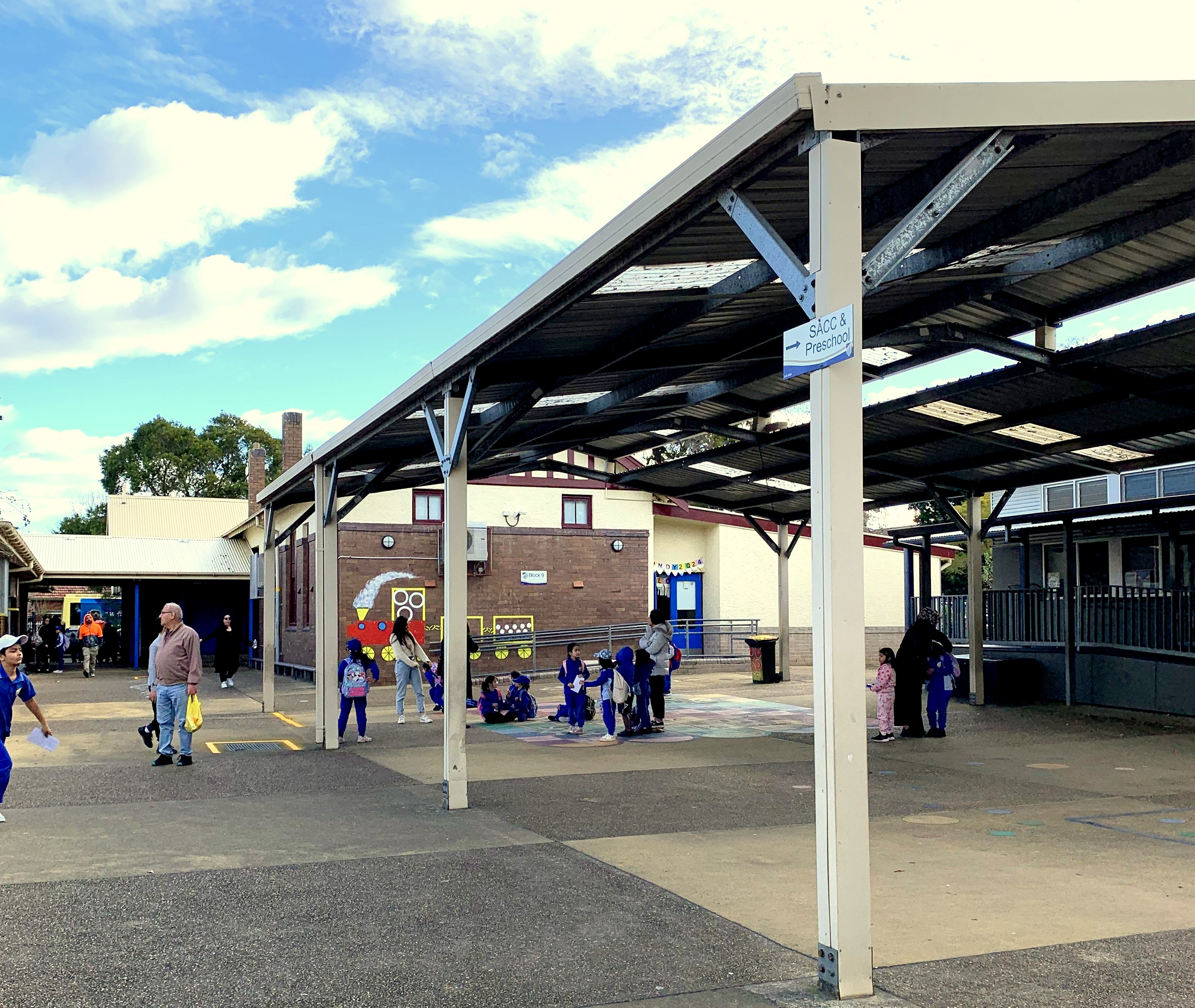
The Kindergarten block

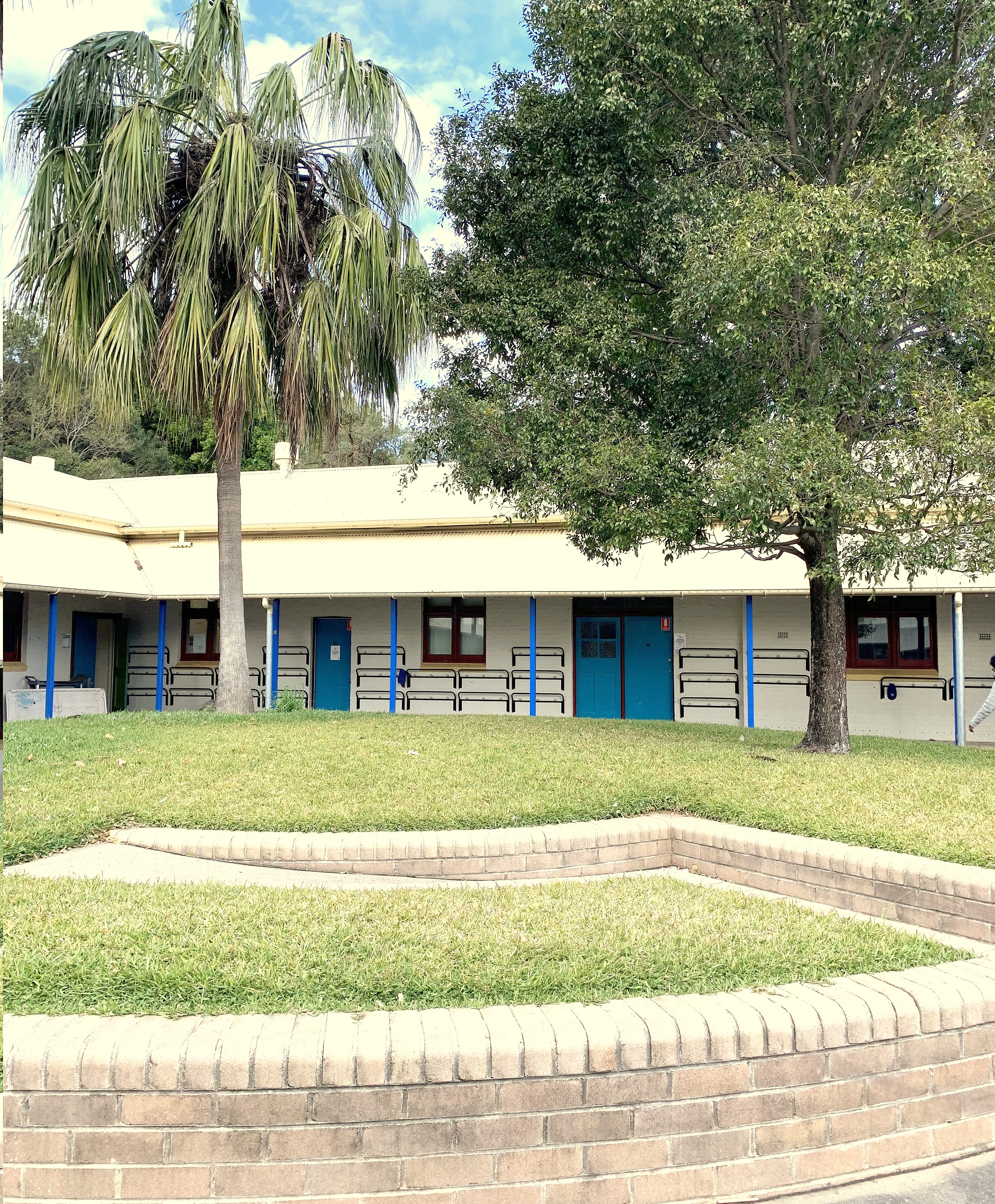
Year 1 and 2 classrooms (block 2)

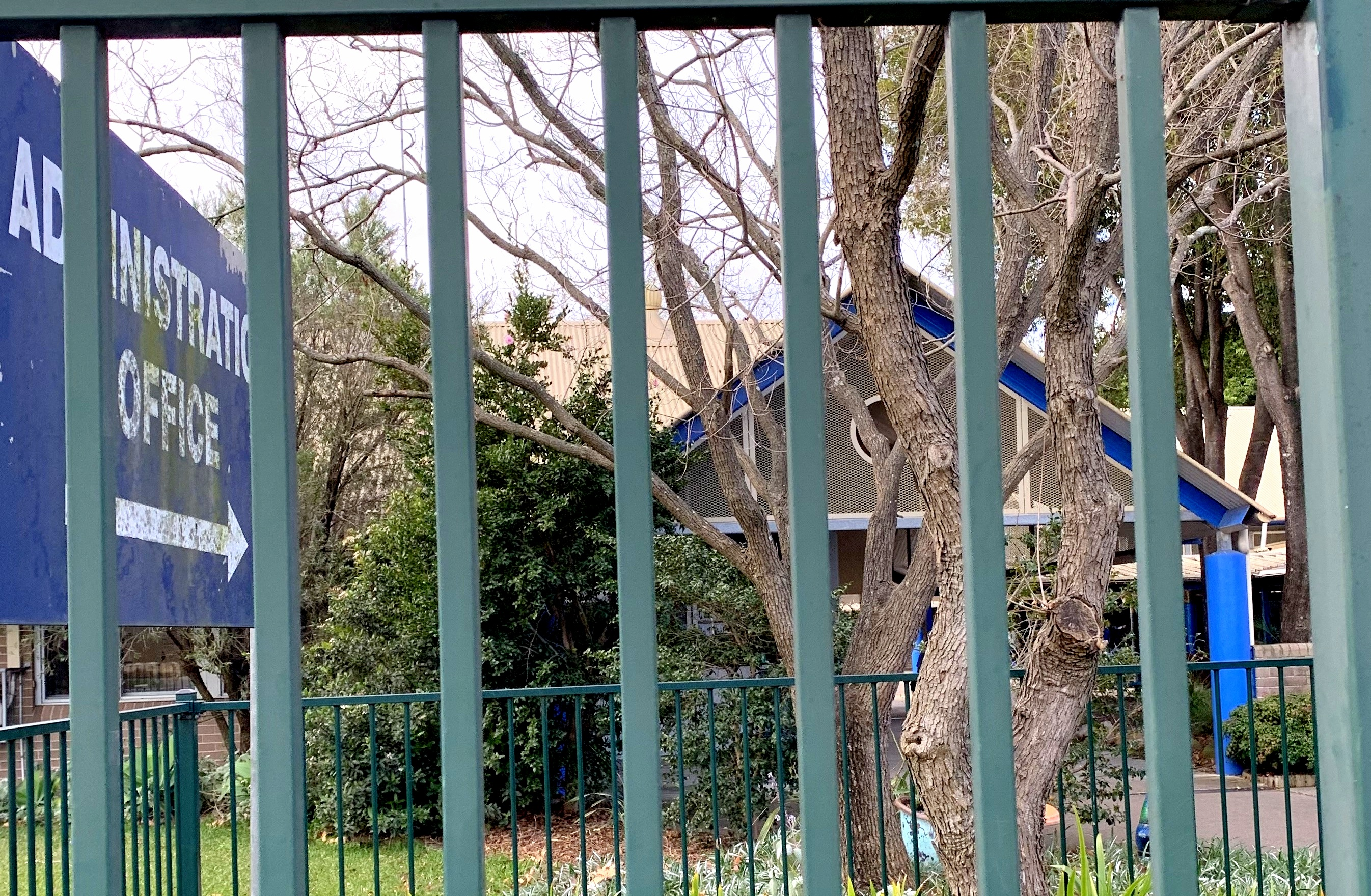
The administration office behind the school gates

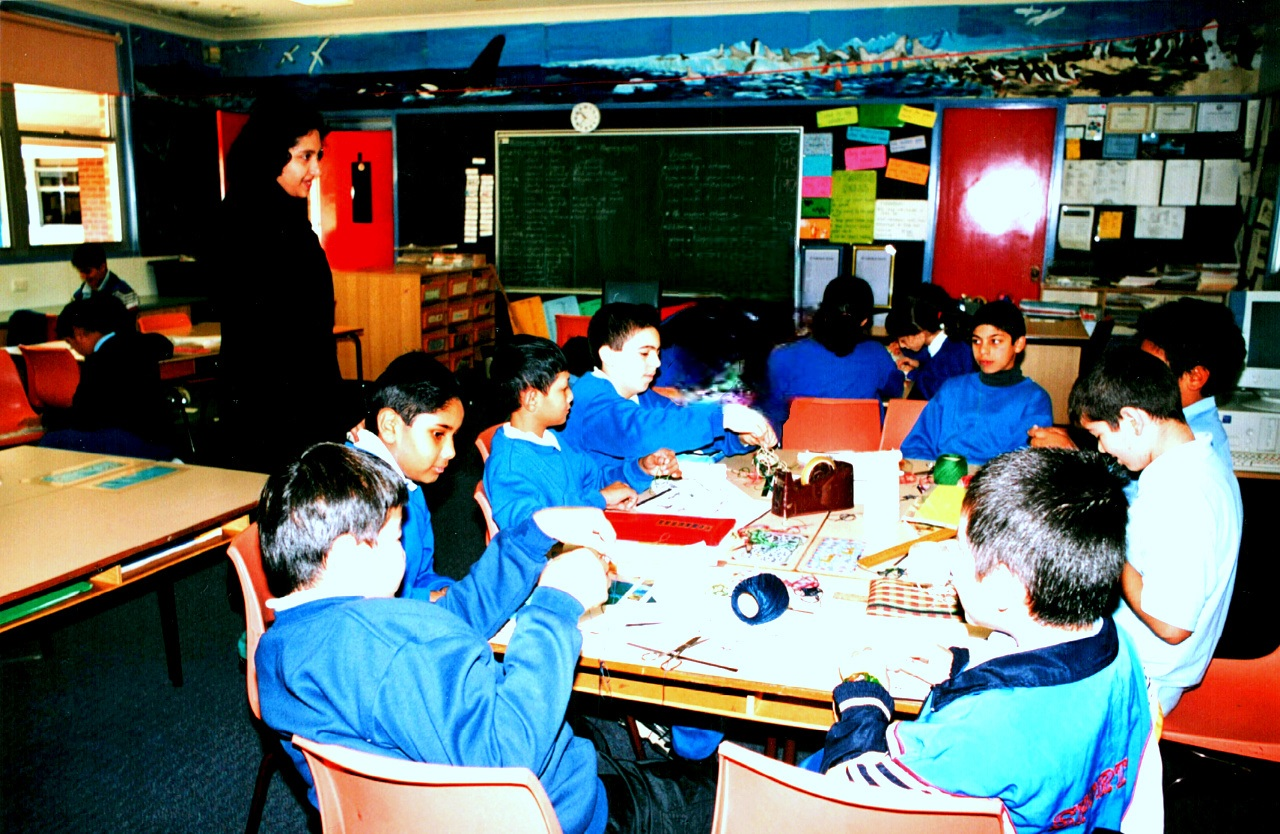
Year 5 and 6 classroom, 2002

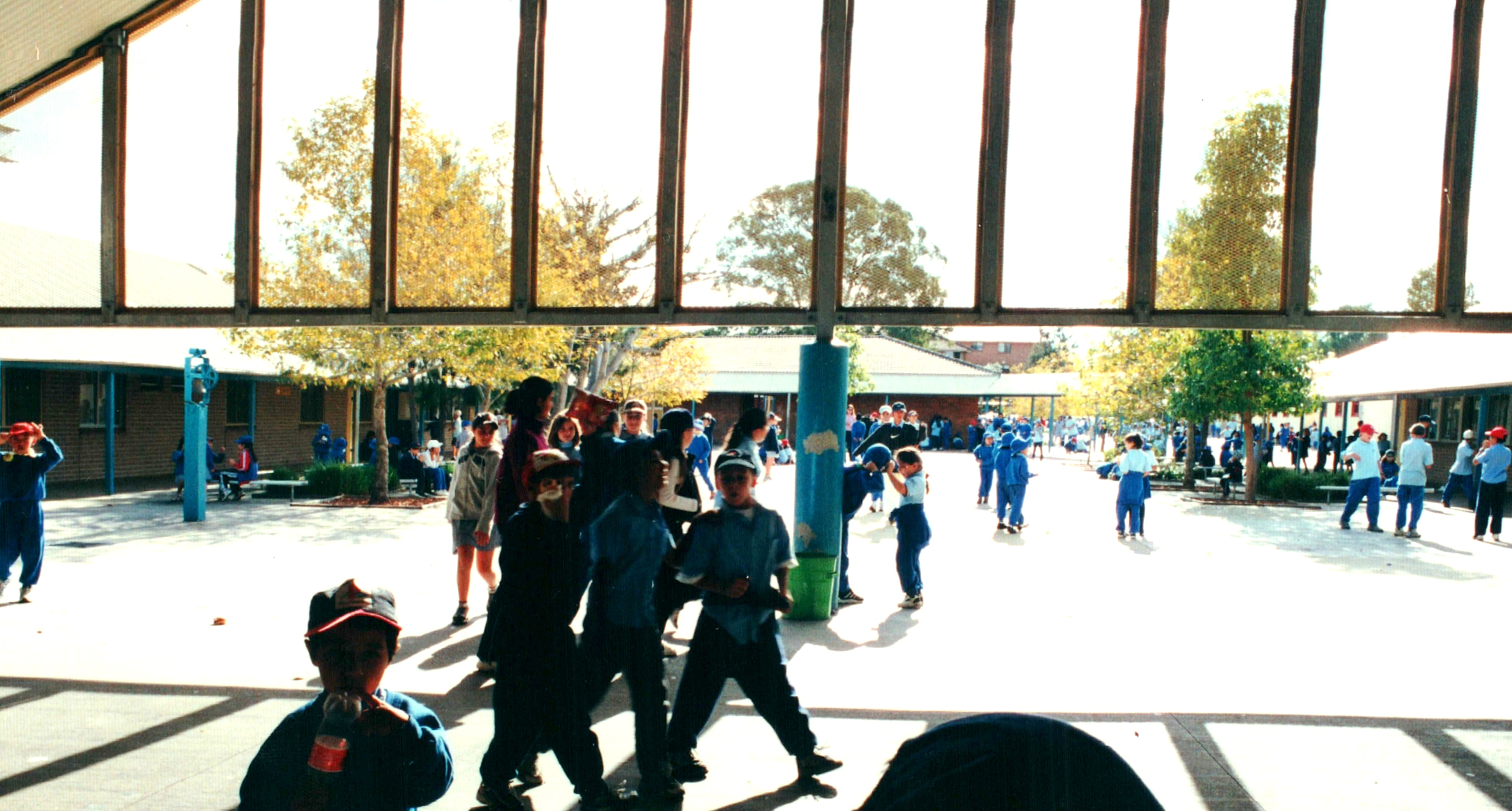
The COLA, 2002

== See also ==
- List of government schools in New South Wales: A–F
