= Denison College of Secondary Education =

Location
- Bathurst, Central West, New South Wales; Australia: 33°24′47″S 149°34′10″E (Bathurst High); 33°24′45″S 149°36′51″E (Kelso High)

Information
- Type: Government-funded co-educational comprehensive secondary day school
- Established: 2007; 19 years ago
- School district: Bathurst; Rural South and West
- Educational authority: NSW Department of Education
- Principal: Michael Sloan
- Teaching staff: 145.4 FTE (2018)
- Employees: 160
- Years: 7–12
- Enrolment: 1,834 (2018)
- Campuses: Bathurst High Campus: Hope Street, Bathurst; Kelso High Campus: Boyd Street, Kelso
- Campus type: Regional
- Website: bathurst-h.schools.nsw.gov.au; kelso-h.schools.nsw.gov.au

Denison College of Secondary Education is a dual-campus government-funded co-educational comprehensive secondary day school, located in Bathurst, in the Central West region of New South Wales, Australia.

Founded in 2007 through the amalgamation of Bathurst High School and Kelso High School, the college enrolled approximately 1,830 students in 2018, from Year 7 to Year 12, of whom 13 percent identified as Indigenous Australians and six percent were from a language background other than English. The college is operated by the NSW Department of Education; and the college principal is Cathleen Compton.

== History ==
In August 2005 a fire completely destroyed Kelso High School. In the wake of the destruction the NSW Education Department sought community consultation as they began to look at new ways to provide enhanced public education to the Bathurst community. These community collaborations, which involved more than 200 people resulted in consensus around a model that called for the establishment of a collegiate, with two-year 7–12 campuses at Kelso and Bathurst High. A feature of this collegiate model was that each campus would maintain its own identity, but the establishment of shared curriculum and resources would increase opportunities for all students.

Denison College was formed to share curriculum, facilities and staff between Bathurst's two public secondary schools, Bathurst High and Kelso High in order to enhance student choice.

== Naming ==
In 2006 the College Reference and Management Committees, which had been created to form the new college, sought to provide the college with a name. Community consultation and deliberations by the committees lead to the name for the college: "Denison College of Secondary Education." The name for the college came from a prominent Bathurst icon, the Denison Bridge; named in honour of Sir William Denison. After the naming of the college, the two high school's forming the collegiate were renamed from Bathurst High School and Kelso High School to Bathurst High Campus and Kelso High Campus respectively.

== Structure ==
The college consists of two year 7–12 campuses with a shared senior curriculum. This blend allows the two campuses to maintain their own unique identities but with increased opportunities for students using the resources of the college.

The college structure is supported by a College Principal and extra staff who work closely with Campus Principals to further develop and enhance the educational experiences for all students. College provided transport further supports the educational needs of senior students by allowing easy movement between campuses to meet course and co-curricula requirements. Denison College has partnerships with Charles Sturt University, Western Institute of TAFE and local industry.

== Campuses ==
Bathurst High Campus has been a centre for education in Bathurst for over 125 years and one of the oldest schools in Australia. The campus is a comprehensive school. The school itself combines heritage buildings with new modern architecture.

Kelso High Campus was established in 1976. A new facility has been built following the fire that damaged the original building.

== See also ==
- List of government schools in New South Wales
- Education in Australia
- Bathurst, New South Wales
