= Fairfield High School (New South Wales) =

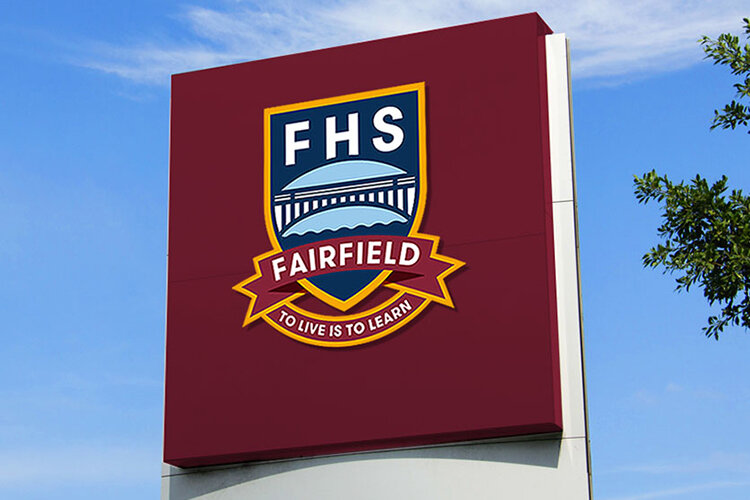
- The school's signboard (logo design by Michael Schepis)

Location
- The Horsley Drive, Fairfield, New South Wales; Australia; 33°51′54″S 150°57′29″E

Information
- Type: Government-funded co-educational comprehensive secondary day school
- Motto: To Live is to Learn
- Established: 1955; 71 years ago
- School district: Fairfield
- Educational authority: New South Wales Department of Education
- Principal: Natalie Isakov
- Teaching staff: 130
- Years: Year 7–12
- Enrolment: 1054 (2024)
- Colours: Maroon and blue
- Website: fairfield-h.schools.nsw.gov.au

Fairfield High School is a government-funded co-educational comprehensive secondary day school, located in Fairfield, a south-western suburb of Sydney, New South Wales, Australia.

Established in 1955 through the merge of two adjacent single-sex high schools: Fairfield Boys High School and Fairfield Girls High School, the school caters for approximately 1,100 students from Year 7 to Year 12. The school is operated by the New South Wales Department of Education.

== Overview ==
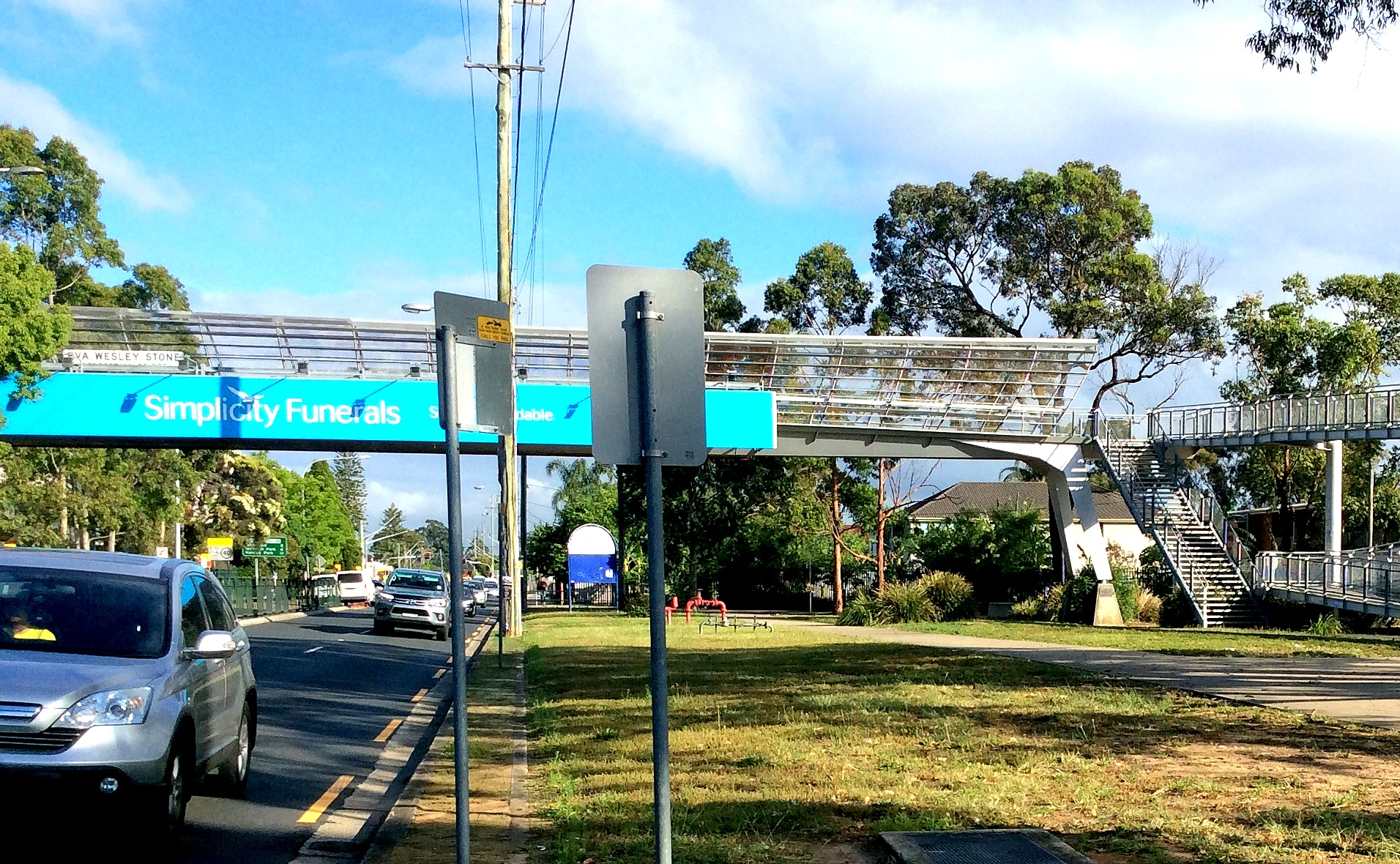
Eva Wesley Stone Pedestrian Bridge

Fairfield High School is a comprehensive local high school located in the heart of the City of Fairfield. Situated in the south western suburbs of Sydney, the school is located on the fringe of the Fairfield Central business district along The Horsley Drive. On the opposite side of the road is the Fairfield Public School and many students graduate from the public school into the high school. Prospect Creek runs northeast of the school, along its oval.

There is a large footbridge (Eva Wesley Stone Pedestrian Bridge) over the Horsley Drive which allows safe access over the road. The $2 million bridge was opened in March 2002 and was named after Eva Wesley Stone, a centenarian Fairfield resident who attended Fairfield Public School and had died in 2001 at the age of 106.

Fairfield High School offers a comprehensive education in a coeducational setting following the NSW curriculum. It contains an Intensive English Centre which caters for newly arrived students from overseas. The school provides for the needs of these students on entry into the Australian high school setting. The school's library features two computer labs for full classes where students can use before school, at lunch period and via the Homework Club. The Fairfield High School building is also used for adult education classes through MacArthur Community College.

Fairfield is one of the most densely populated suburbs in Sydney containing residents from all over the world. The community is one of the most multicultural communities in Sydney. Small remnants of Western Sydney Dry Rainforest occur along the nearby Prospect Creek, including on the steeper banks behind the school.

== Demographics ==
The school has a Family Occupation Employment Index (FOEI) of 183. The school is diverse with 93.5% of students from a language background other than English (mainly from Syria, Iraq, Vietnam and the Pacific Islands) and 1% are from an Aboriginal and Torres Strait Islander background. 40% of students need some level of English as an Additional Language or Dialect support (EAL/D). About 50% of students come from a refugee background.

The school features 130 teaching staff and 35 non-teaching staff, who are a mix of early career teachers and newly elected executive staff who are new teaching. In addition, the school has a speech therapist, a psychologist, a school lawyer funded by Legal Aid and a registered nurse funded by Refugee Health. 2.5% of the department's overall personnel identify as Aboriginal and/or Torres Strait Islander Peoples. In 2023, 21.68% of year 12 students took vocational education and training. In addition to 90% of all Year 12 students completing Higher School Certificate, 56 year 12 students had early entry offers to university in 2023.

=== Reception ===
In 2023, the Tell Them From Me Survey (TTFM) was given to students to evaluate and accumulate data of several characteristics of the school. The survey showed that 55% of the students reported a positive sense of belonging; 72% reported they have positive expectations for success and 51% reported a positive support at school, and 47% reported high prosperity combined with high expectations.

== Logo Design ==
Fairfield High School in 2016 underwent a rebranding process changing the logo and uniforms. The current logo is designed by western Sydney designer Michael Schepis, creative director at Handle Branding. The new branding and identity draws from its past evolutions and further references the historic Lansdowne Bridge and the bridging of the community and the schools as Fairfield was once divided into an all boys and all girls school.

== Notable alumni ==
- Mark Aarons – journalist and author
- Jelena Dokić – Australian/Serbian tennis player
- Wayne Merton – Australian politician, Minister for Justice 1992–1993 and an elected member for the New South Wales Legislative Assembly
- Isaac Ntiamoah – athlete; represented Australia at the 2012 Olympics
- Mar Mari Emmanuel – Ancient Assyrian Church of the East bishop and influencer

== See also ==
- List of government schools in New South Wales
- Education in Australia
