= Bathurst High Campus =

Bathurst High Campus of Denison College of Secondary Education

Location
- Bathurst, Central West, New South Wales; Australia; 33°24′47″S 149°34′10″E

Information
- Type: Government-funded co-educational comprehensive secondary day school campus
- Motto: Latin: Altiora Peto ("I seek higher things")
- Established: 1 October 1883; 143 years ago (as Bathurst High School)
- School district: Bathurst; Rural South and West
- Educational authority: NSW Department of Education
- Principal: Ken Barwick
- Years: 7–12
- Enrolment: 1,044 (2024)
- Campus type: Regional
- Colours: Royal blue and gold
- Website: bathurst-h.schools.nsw.gov.au

The Bathurst High Campus (abbreviated as BHC or BHS) of Denison College of Secondary Education is a government-funded co-educational comprehensive secondary day school campus, located in Bathurst, in the Central West region of New South Wales, Australia.

Established in 1883 as Bathurst High School, the school amalgamated with Kelso High School in 2007 to form Denison College of Secondary Education. In 2024, Bathurst High Campus enrolled approximately 1,044 students from Year 7 to Year 12, of whom approximately eleven percent identified as Indigenous Australians and six percent were from a language background other than English. The campus is operated by the NSW Department of Education; and the Campus Principal is Ken Barwick.

The campus has several bands and a range of art, visual design, dance and drama classes, and debating teams.

== Denison College of Secondary Education ==
After the August 2005 fire which destroyed Kelso High, Denison College was formed to share curriculum, facilities and staff between schools in order to enhance student choice. Bathurst High has since undergone a name change from Bathurst High School to Bathurst High Campus; and is a campus of Denison College of Secondary Education.

== Astley Cup ==
The Astley Cup is a long-standing sporting competition between Bathurst High, Orange High and Dubbo Senior College. The Astley Cup incorporates rugby league, girls and boys soccer, tennis, hockey, basketball, karate, netball, polo and athletics. The Astley Cup also includes the coveted Mulvey Cup debating competition. Bathurst High has had a long history of victory in this debating competition, successfully taking out the cup this year.

== Notable alumni ==
- Brian Booth – cricket player; represented Australia
- Allan Robert Callaghan – Rhodes Scholar in 1925
- Nan Hunt – writer
- Rodney Rude – comedian, poet and writer
- Archie Thompson – soccer player; played with the Socceroos
- Ronan Daunt – cricket player; played with the ACT Comets
- Matthew Lobb – Rhodes Scholar in 1994

== See also ==
- List of government schools in New South Wales
- Education in Australia
