= Leightonfield =

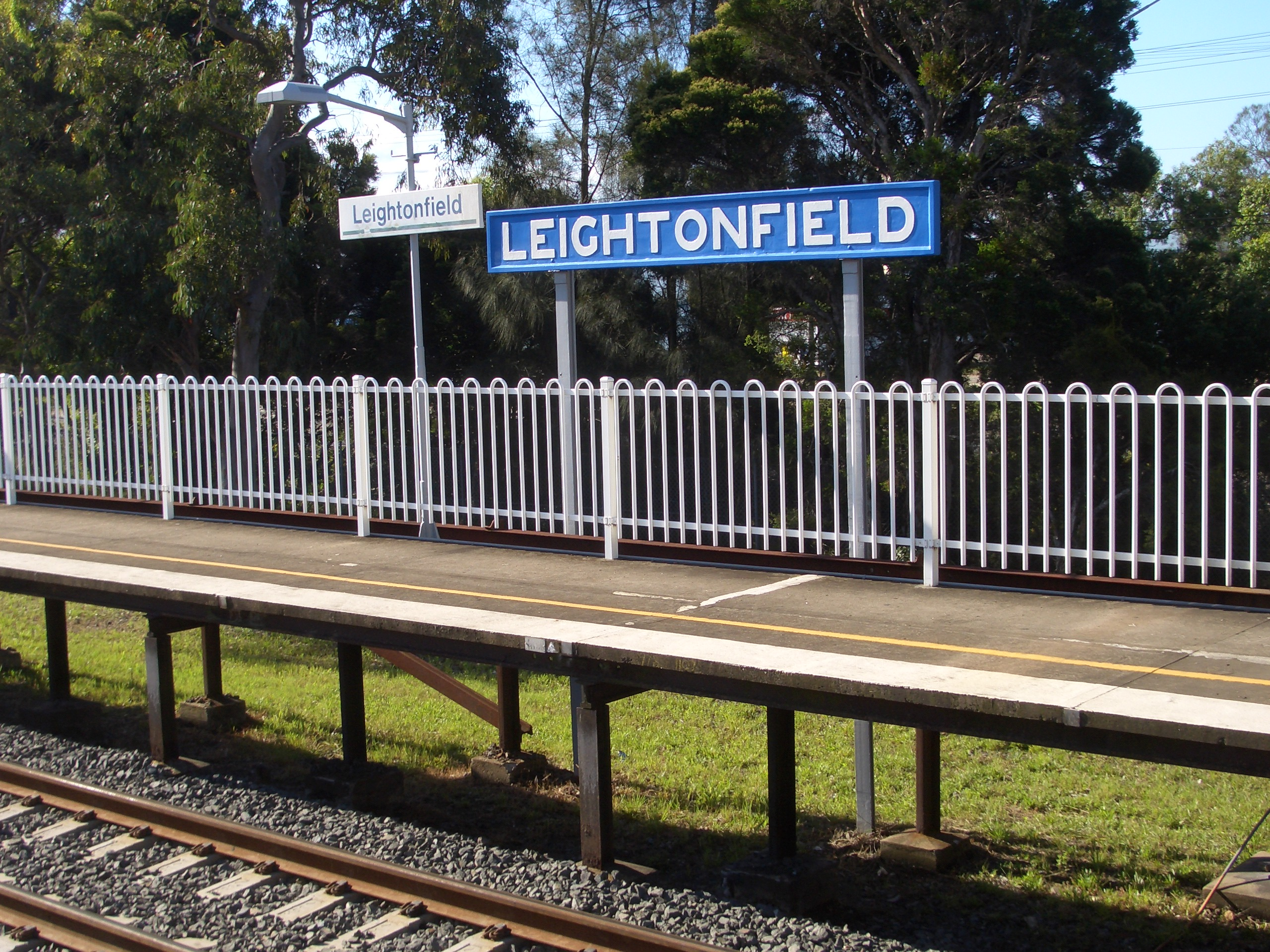
- Leightonfield station

- Coordinates: 33°52′52.3″S 150°59′6.0″E
- Country: Australia
- State: New South Wales
- City: Villawood
- LGA: City of Canterbury-Bankstown
- Location: 26 km (16 mi) west of Sydney CBD
Localities around Leightonfield
Fairfield East	Old Guildford	Chester Hill
Villawood	Leightonfield	Chester Hill
Lansdowne	Villawood	Bass Hill

Leightonfield is an industrial locality in south-western Sydney, in the state of New South Wales, Australia.

== Geography ==
Sandwiched between Chester Hill and Villawood, Leightonfield is part of the City of Canterbury-Bankstown and is within the suburb of Villawood. Leightonfield's postcode is 2163.

== Commercial area ==
Leightonfield is exclusively an industrial estate within Villawood that features dozens of warehouses, workshops and factories. It is a prominent manufacturing hub in western Sydney. It has no permanent population.

== Transport ==
It is served by Sydney Trains and various bus routes.
