= Terry Lamb Complex =

Sporting fields in Sydney, Australia

- Interactive map of Terry Lamb Complex
- Capacity: 5,000
- Surface: Grass

Tenants
- Chester Hill Youth Cricket Club; Chester Hill Hornets
- Type: Sporting fields
- Location: Corner of Waldron and Miller Roads, Chester Hill, Sydney, New South Wales, Australia
- Coordinates: 33°52′53″S 150°59′42″E
- Etymology: Terry Lamb OAM

The Terry Lamb Complex is a series of grass sporting fields located on the corner of Waldron and Miller Roads, Chester Hill, Sydney, New South Wales, Australia. The complex is the home ground of the Chester Hill Hornets who compete in the Canterbury-Bankstown District Junior Rugby League competition. The complex was renamed in 1986 in honour of Terry Lamb OAM who played for the Hornets as a junior. It is also the home ground of the Chester Hill Youth Cricket Club who compete in the Bankstown District Cricket Association competition.

The complex incorporates two grounds known as Abbott Park (for rugby league) and Frank Bamfield Oval (for cricket). The Terry Lamb Complex has an enclosed football field that is fenced off, a cricket oval, two cricket nets, two canteen facilities, four dressing room facilities, referees room, function room and a car park. The main rugby league field has 200-lux powered lights for night games. The main building at the Terry Lamb Complex is named the Bill Lovelee Youth Centre and acts the clubhouse of the Chester Hill Hornets and Chester Hill Youth Cricket Club.

Additional parking is available for the Terry Lamb Complex on Campbell Hill Road, Miller Road, Waldron Road, Frost Lane and Virgil Avenue with easy access to the ground from the Chester Hill railway station and Chester Hill shops.

== See also ==
- List of parks in Sydney
