= Villawood railway station =

Railway station in Sydney, New South Wales, Australia

Villawood
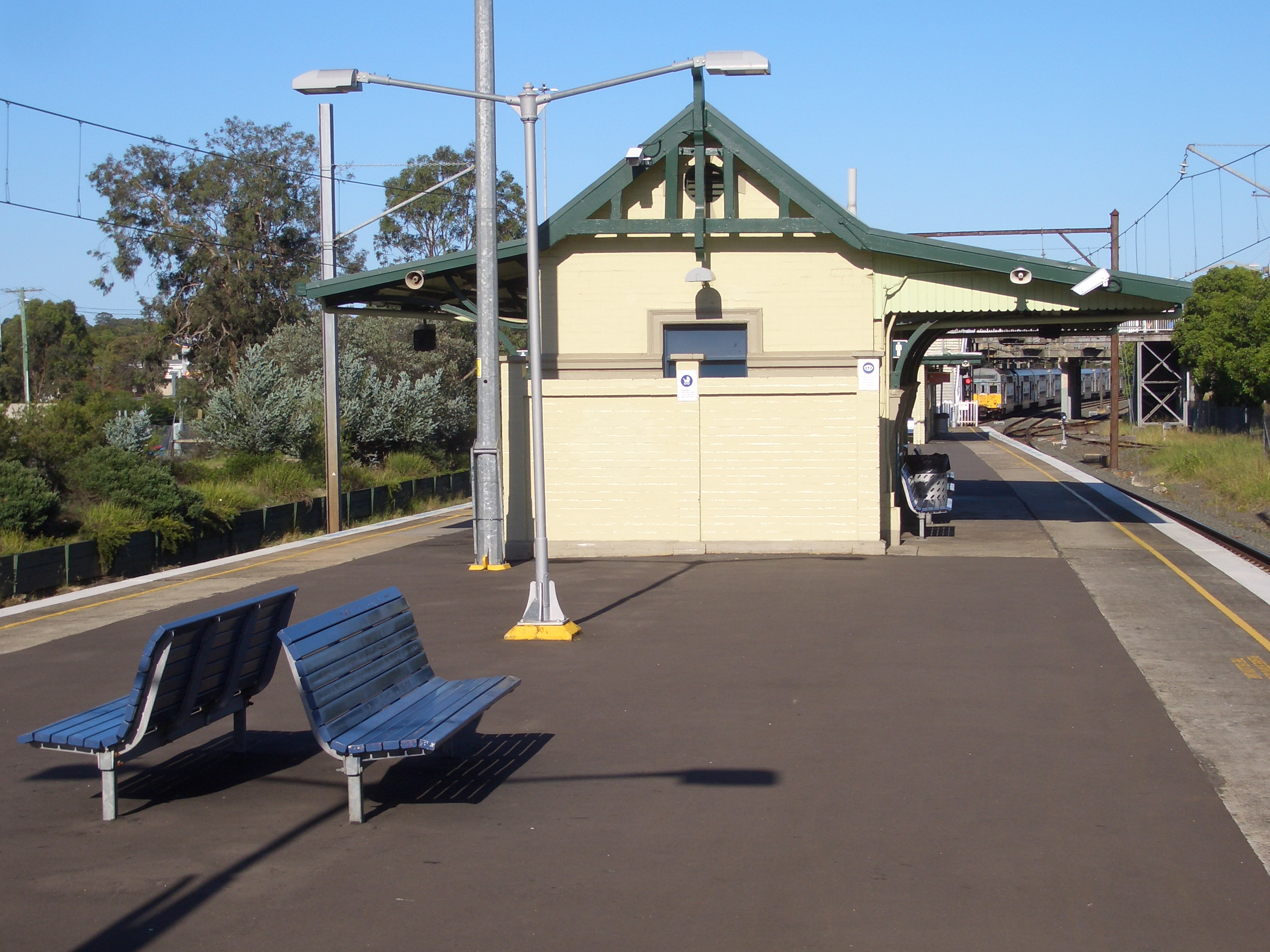
- Eastbound view in November 2007

General information
- Location: River Avenue, Villawood; Australia
- Coordinates: 33°52′51″S 150°58′34″E
- Owner: Transport Asset Manager of New South Wales
- Operator: Sydney Trains
- Line: Main Southern
- Distance: 24.50 kilometres (15.22 mi) from Central
- Platforms: 2 (1 island)
- Tracks: 2
- Connections: Bus

Construction
- Structure type: Ground
- Accessible: No

Other information
- Status: Weekdays: Staffed: 6am to 2pm: Weekends and public holidays: Unstaffed
- Station code: VWD
- Website: Transport for NSW

History
- Opened: 8 October 1924

Passengers
- 2023: 258,260 (year); 708 (daily) (Sydney Trains, NSW TrainLink)

Services
| Preceding station | Sydney Trains | Following station |
|---|---|---|
| Carramar towards Liverpool | T3 Liverpool & Inner West Line | Leightonfield towards City Circle |
Location

Villawood railway station is a heritage-listed railway station on the Main Southern railway line in the Sydney suburb of Villawood. It is served by Sydney Trains' T3 Liverpool & Inner West Line services.

== History ==
Villawood station opened on 8 October 1924 when the Main Southern railway line was extended from Regents Park to Cabramatta.

The station is along the route of the Southern Sydney Freight Line.

On 16 November 2026, Premier Chris Minns announced a major upgrade work as part of the New South Wales Labor Party Government's "Safe Accessible Transport" program to be completed by 2029. The work includes three new lifts, a new footbridge, accessible footpaths, new parking spaces, redeveloped platform spaces, toilet facilities, new signage and upgraded lighting.

== Platforms and services ==
Historically, eastbound services connected Villawood to the City Circle via Lidcombe and the Main Suburban railway line. Between 2013 and 2024, eastbound services from Villawood to the City Circle ran only via an alternate route along the Bankstown railway line. Following the partial closure of the Bankstown railway line for Sydney Metro conversion in 2024, this situation reverted. Now eastbound services from Villawood operate to the City Circle via Lidcombe again, branded as the T3 Liverpool & Inner West Line.

| Platform | Line | Stopping pattern | Notes |
| 1 | T3 Liverpool & Inner West Line | services to Central & the City Circle via Regents Park | |
| 2 | T3 Liverpool & Inner West Line | services to Liverpool | |

== Accessibility ==
Villawood station is not currently wheelchair-accessible, and this had led to some criticism from the disabled community. It has been titled as "Sydney's Worst Train Station for Access". An upgrade was announced in 2026 that would rebuild the station facilities to make it accessible by the end of 2029.

== Transport links ==
Transit Systems NSW operates three bus routes via Villawood station, under contract to Transport for NSW:

- 905: Fairfield station to Bankstown station
- 907: Parramatta station to Bankstown station
- S4: Fairfield to Chester Hill shopping service

Villawood station is served by one NightRide route:

- N50: Liverpool station to Town Hall station
