= Villawood =

- Suburb
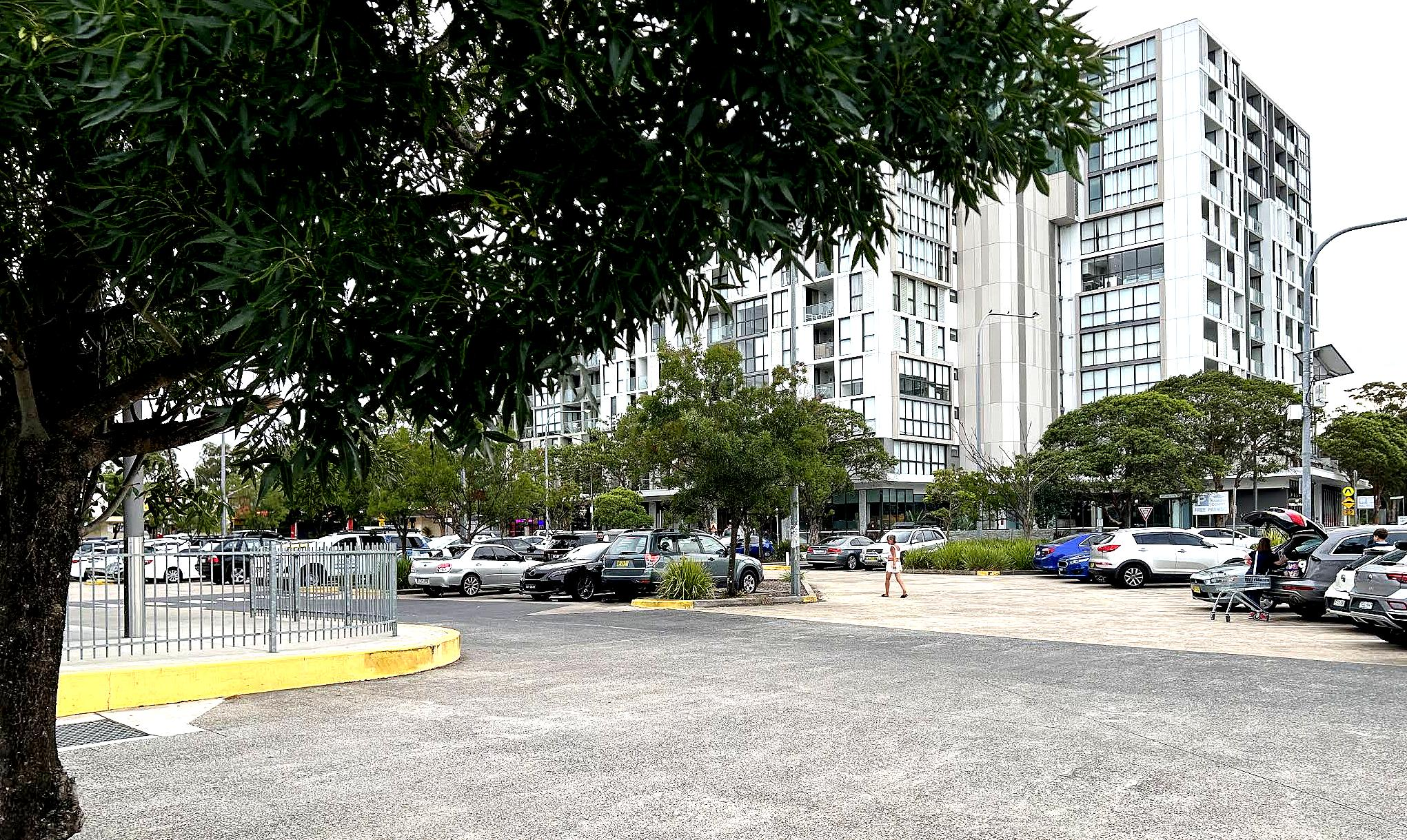
- Villawood town centre

- Interactive map of Villawood
- Coordinates: 33°53′10″S 150°58′44″E
- Country: Australia
- State: New South Wales
- City: Sydney
- LGAs: City of Canterbury-Bankstown; City of Fairfield
- Location: 27 km (17 mi) west of Sydney CBD

Government
  - State electorates: Bankstown; Fairfield
  - Federal divisions: Blaxland; Fowler
- Elevation: 25 m (82 ft)

Population
  - Total: 7,051 (2021 census)
- Postcode: 2163
Suburbs around Villawood
Old Guildford	Guildford	Chester Hill
Carramar	Villawood	Chester Hill
Lansdowne	Bass Hill	Bass Hill

Villawood is a suburb in Western Sydney in the state of New South Wales, Australia. A residential and industrial suburb, Villawood is part of the local government areas City of Canterbury-Bankstown and City of Fairfield, and is located 27 kilometres west of the Sydney central business district.

Villawood is the site of the former post-war Villawood Migrant Hostel, which was later converted into the Villawood Immigration Detention Centre. Originally intended as a temporary solution to Sydney's post-war accommodation shortage, the hostel remained in operation for decades as persistent housing shortages made it difficult for many migrants to secure permanent housing. As a result, it became one of the largest and longest-running migrant hostels in the Sydney region.

Villawood was historically associated with social disadvantage, public housing and organised crime, earning the nickname "The Bronx" during the 1990s. Beginning in 2017, however, Villawood underwent substantial redevelopment, with older commercial properties giving way to apartment developments and mixed-use projects, particularly within the town centre. The centre contains a variety of retail stores, cafés, restaurants and service businesses, including a number of Lebanese and Asian dining establishments.

== History ==
The Aboriginal tribe of Gandangara once lived in the area. European settlement began in the early 1840s. During the 1860s, Villawood was used as pastoral land, but it was overrun with wild dogs. Woodville Road, which runs through Villawood, was once named Dog Trap Road because many farmers set dog traps for these wild dogs. A train station opened in 1922 to service the area was originally known as Woodville Road. Unfortunately, there was confusion with another place called Woodville in the Hunter Valley and thus the name was transposed into 'Villawood'.

=== Villawood Migrant Hostel ===
The Villawood Migrant Hostel was established by the Department of Immigration in the late 1940s to accommodate the large influx of post-war migrants, refugees and displaced persons arriving in Australia. At the time the hostel was proposed, the site was largely covered by native bushland. Much of this vegetation was cleared in 1949 to facilitate the construction of migrant accommodation. Located on the site of a former munitions factory near Leightonfield railway station, the hostel provided temporary accommodation and settlement services for hundreds of thousands of new arrivals between 1948 and the early 1990s. Early accommodation consisted of converted Nissen huts, where families often shared cramped living quarters and relied on communal dining, laundry and sanitation facilities. Residents came from a wide range of countries and frequently faced challenges associated with language barriers, cultural adjustment, social exclusion and economic insecurity. Despite these difficulties, the hostel provided access to employment assistance, welfare services, housing advice and English-language classes, helping migrants establish themselves in Australian society.

Accounts from former residents describe the hostel as a vibrant social environment, where newcomers gathered for recreation, including table tennis, and formed lasting friendships. In 1964, the hostel was home to about 1,425 residents and became notable as the place where The Easybeats were formed by five recently arrived migrants from three different countries. However, many migrants from Europe found the climate of Western Sydney difficult to adjust to, particularly during summer, when temperatures inside the hostel's accommodation could become uncomfortably hot. Living conditions were often crowded, with multiple families sharing limited space in former Nissen huts, and were the subject of recurring complaints. In 1958, residents petitioned Prime Minister Robert Menzies and organised a protest involving more than 500 migrants over housing standards, food quality and hostel management. In 1968, the hostel was expanded with the construction of the Westbridge brick units, which provided more substantial accommodation with internal bathrooms.

For many migrants and refugees, the hostel served as their first home in Australia and played an important role in the post-war settlement of Western Sydney. Remnants of the original hostel buildings survive on the site, which later became the Villawood Immigration Detention Centre. Historians have identified the hostel as a significant site in the history of Australian immigration, reflecting post-war migration policies and the growth of Greater Sydney. The hostel has also been cited as an example of the Commonwealth Government's post-war population-building policies. Facilities for families and children formed a prominent part of the complex, reflecting a preference for younger migrants whose settlement was expected to contribute both to population growth and to future generations of Australian-born residents.

=== Contemporary history ===
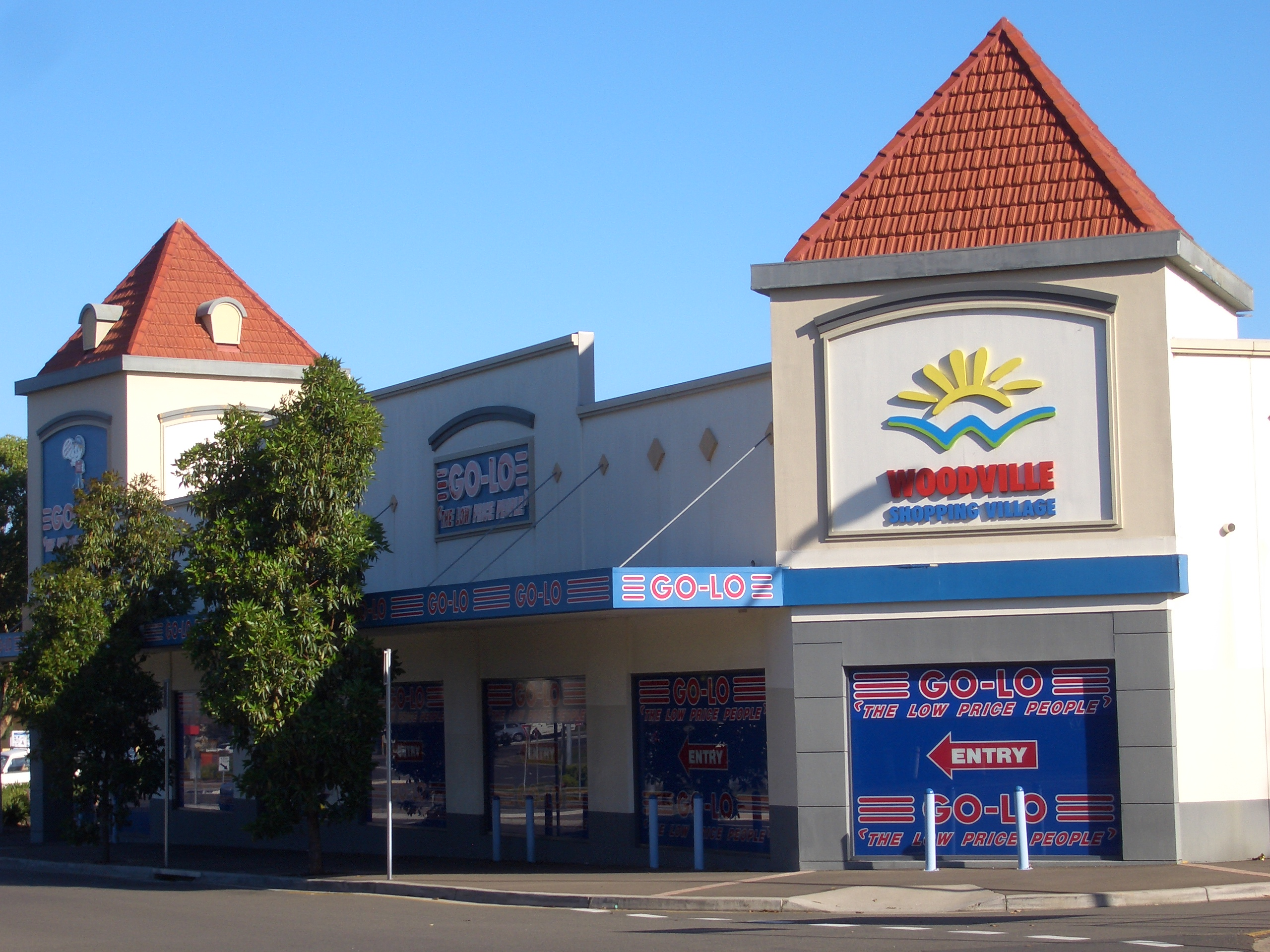
The former Woodville Shopping Village in 2007, which was replaced by apartment buildings in 2022.

In 2003, media reports linked Villawood to investigations into the so-called "Bronx Boys", a criminal gang based in the suburb's Housing Commission estate. According to police intelligence reports cited by The Sun-Herald, the group had evolved from petty criminal activity into a drug trafficking and firearms distribution network during the late 1990s. The reports alleged that gang members were involved in the supply of illicit drugs and weapons and had become the focus of the New South Wales Police Force surveillance operations. The investigation gained renewed attention following a series of gangland shootings and murders in south-western Sydney, some of which police believed were connected to individuals previously identified during the inquiry. In 2004, questions were raised in the Parliament of New South Wales as to whether senior New South Wales Police officers had been advised in 1999 that the demolition of the Villawood Housing Estate had dispersed members of the local Bronx Boys gang, potentially hindering police investigations.

In 2016, a planning proposal was lodged for a mixed-use development on Villawood Road comprising tower blocks above ground-floor retail premises, including a supermarket, together with commercial space and a civic space linking the site to Villawood Place, the suburb's commercial centre. The development was proposed for the site of the former Woodville Shopping Village, which was demolished in late 2016. In March 2018, Fairfield City Council adopted urban design studies for the Villawood town centre, including adjoining vacant land owned by the New South Wales Land and Housing Corporation that had been earmarked for high-density residential development, improved pedestrian connections, road upgrades and new public open spaces. The proposal emphasised active street frontages along Howatt Street and integration with an expanded Hilwa Park. A planning analysis identified a shortage of commercial and retail floor space in the Villawood town centre, estimating a shortfall of approximately 7,000 square metres. The proposal also noted that Villawood's labour force participation rate was lower than the City of Fairfield average in 2021 and argued that additional commercial development could support local employment opportunities and housing growth in an area well served by public transport.

A mixed-use development completed in 2022 comprises approximately 122 residential apartment blocks above a podium containing around 2,700 square metres of retail and commercial floor space, including a supermarket and ground-floor retail tenancies, in proximity to local services and public transport. The analysis projected substantial population growth in Villawood by 2041 and concluded that additional commercial and retail development would be required to meet future demand for goods and services. It estimated that the town centre's commercial floor space would need to increase to approximately 9,800 square metres by 2031. In 2024, Fairfield City Council undertook a series of public-domain improvements in Villawood as part of its town-centre revitalisation program. Works included the installation of additional seating, upgrades to bus-stop infrastructure, repainting of street furniture and community facilities, and improvements to landscaping and tree planting. The project formed part of the council's response to community consultation undertaken in 2020, which identified cleaner streets, attractive town centres, and improved public spaces and parks among residents' key priorities for the period 2022–2032.

== Commercial area ==
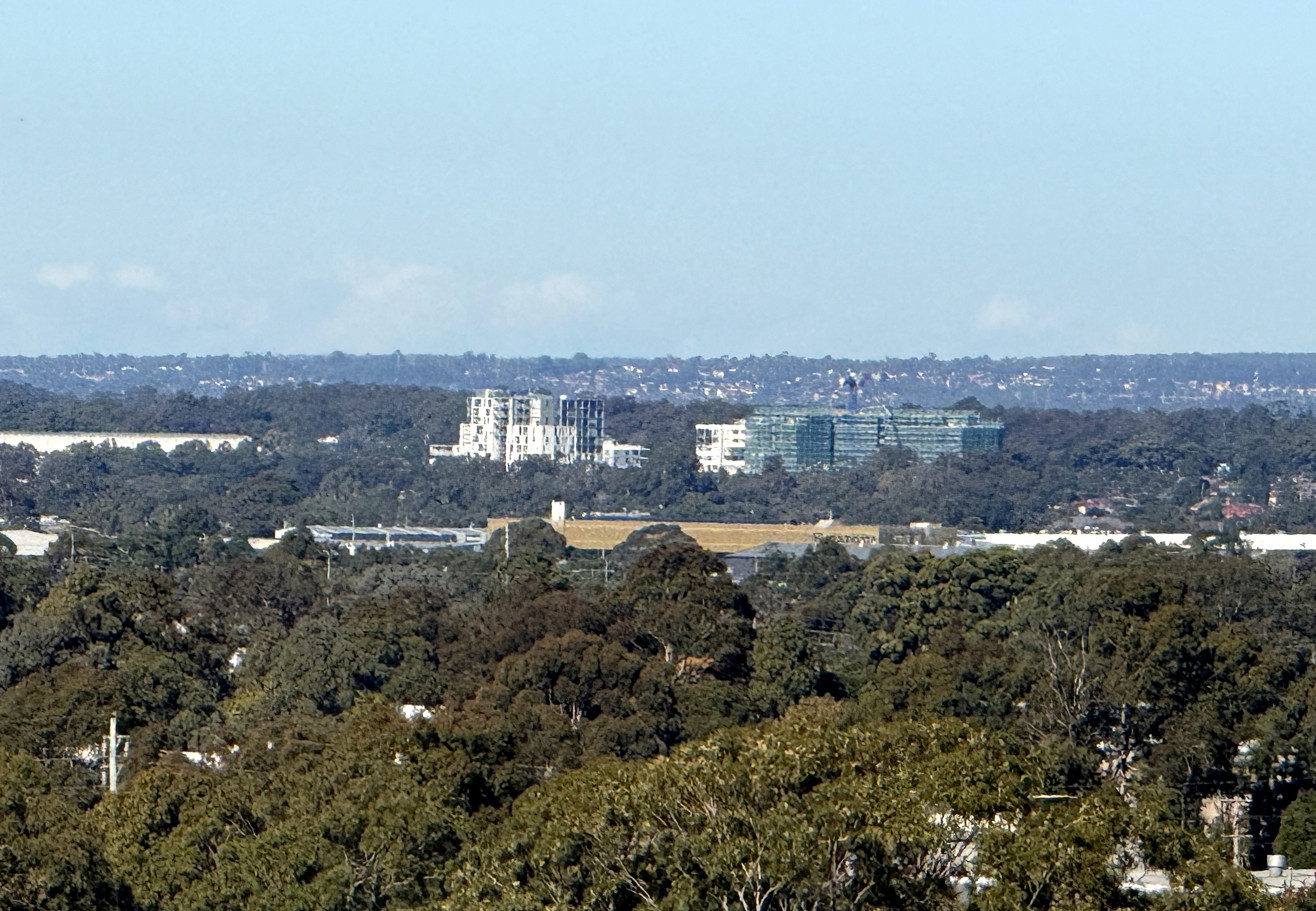
Mid-rise apartment buildings in Villawood rise above the tree canopy in the middle distance, viewed from Greystanes.

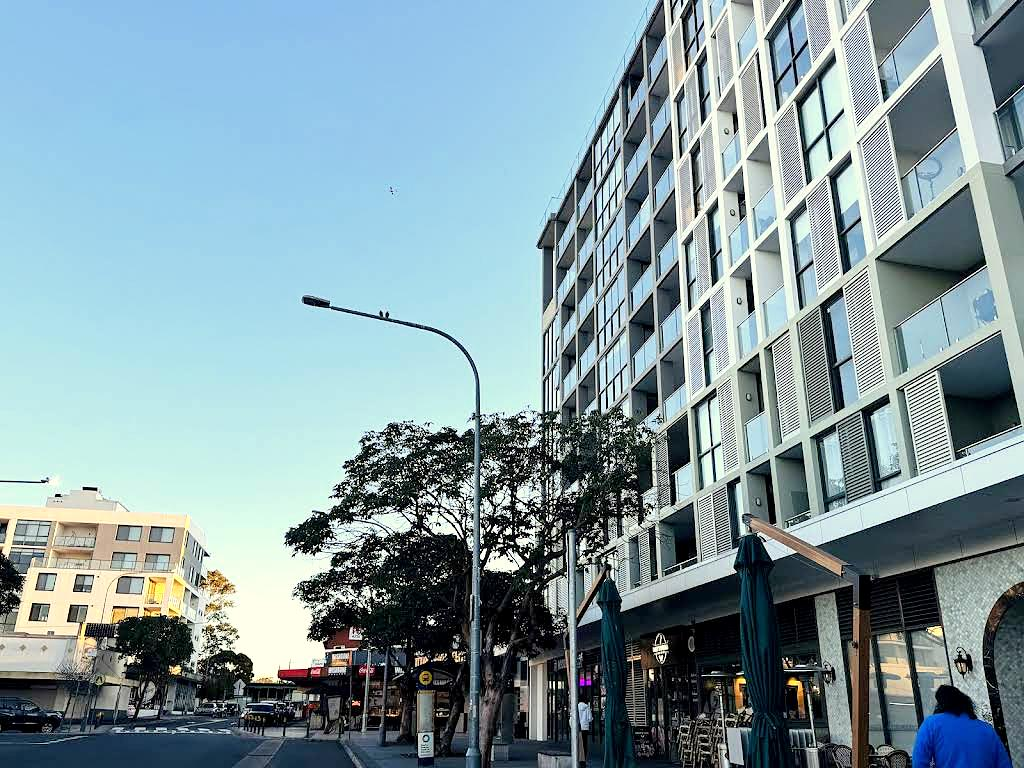
A residential tower (V1 apartments) on the corner of Villawood Road and Villawood Place, replacing the former Woodville Shopping Village.

The Villawood town centre is located on the eastern edge of the City of Fairfield, adjacent to the City of Canterbury-Bankstown. It lies approximately 2 km east of Fairfield, 6.5 km north-east of Liverpool, and about 10 km from both Parramatta and Bankstown. The town centre is served by rail and bus services, providing direct connections to Cabramatta and Liverpool. Other major centres, including Fairfield, Parramatta and the Sydney central business district, are accessible by rail via connecting services.

Villawood Place was once a major shopping centre that featured Woodville Shopping Village, serving the surrounding areas. After nearby Bass Hill Plaza opened, many Villawood businesses went into decline, leaving a legacy of abandoned shop fronts and buildings, including the abandoned Franklins supermarket and large Australia Post office. In 2021, the Government of New South Wales redeveloped a long-vacant 15,200-square-metre site in Villawood. The redevelopment included nearly 400 dwellings, comprising private and social housing, together with a supermarket and community facilities.

The project formed part of the broader renewal of Villawood Place, which also saw the construction of new retail premises, including homegoods stores, a bakery, pharmacies, grocers and other businesses. A business park in Villawood holds enterprises concerning hardware products, furniture, auto parts and second-hand goods. The suburb also has a McDonald's, a KFC and a Bunnings. The ABA Group lodged plans for an $80 million mixed-use development at 896–898 Woodville Road and 15 Hilwa Street. The proposal comprised an 11-storey complex containing residential apartments (V1 aparments) above ground-floor commercial and retail premises and formed part of broader redevelopment activity within Villawood's town centre. According to local real-estate agents, Villawood experienced significant social and demographic change during the early 21st century, transitioning from a suburb historically associated with public housing and lower-income households to one attracting a broader mix of residents and business owners.

=== Transport ===
The suburb is served by bus routes linking Bankstown, Fairfield and Parramatta. Bus stops are concentrated along River Avenue, Woodville Road and Villawood Place. The Villawood town centre is situated close to the Fairfield East and Villawood–Chester Hill industrial areas, which are significant employment precincts in the region. Road access is provided by The Horsley Drive, which links Villawood to Fairfield and the wider metropolitan road network. Nearby arterial roads, including Henry Lawson Drive and the Hume Highway, provide connections to the M5 Motorway, Liverpool and Sydney CBD. Woodville Road to the east also serves the suburb.

Community and recreational facilities, local shops and Villawood railway station are located within walking distance of the site. The town centre is situated immediately south of the Bankstown railway line, which provides rail connections to Liverpool, Bankstown and the Sydney central business district, as well as links to Parramatta via Lidcombe and to Fairfield via Cabramatta. Villawood railway station and Leightonfield railway station are on the Main Southern railway line. Leightonfield railway station services an industrial area in the eastern part of Villawood.The adjacent freight corridor forms part of the Southern Sydney Freight Line, which connects southern New South Wales with Port Botany.

=== Community facilities ===
Fairfield City Council undertook a range of infrastructure and public-space improvements in Villawood, including the $1.9 million redevelopment of Koonoona Park, which opened in late 2020. The suburb is located near a number of educational institutions, including Carramar Public School, Villawood North Public School, Sacred Heart Catholic Primary School, Fairfield High School, Canley Vale High School and Chester Hill High School. There are also day and community centres, several Christian churches and a Mosque conducts Islamic services in the old post office building on Woodville Road at the shopping centre. The suburb is also home to the Villawood Hotel, located on Woodville Road.

Apart from the Timezone entertainment centre, which includes indoor climbing, ten-pin bowling, go-karting and a children's play centre, Villawood is home to several sporting and recreational facilities, including the Wran Leisure Centre, Thurina Park and Villawood Skatepark. The Wran Leisure Centre, named after former Premier of New South Wales Neville Wran, contains a swimming pool, tennis courts, a gymnasium and squash courts. Thurina Park contains two multipurpose sporting fields used for soccer, cricket and baseball, and is home to Villawood United Soccer Club. Hilwa Park is a narrow park that features a small children’s playground area.

== Demographics ==
At the 2021 census, Villawood recorded a population of 7,051. Of these:

- The median age of Villawood residents was 34 years, compared to the national median of 38 years. Children aged 0–14 years made up 20.5% of the population (national average is 18.2%) and people aged 65 years and over made up 12.3% of the population (national average is 17.2%).
- There is a very diverse ethnic range. Fewer than half (41.6%) of residents were born in Australia; the next most common countries of birth were Vietnam 12.7%, Lebanon 7.3%, China 3.4%, Afghanistan 2.5% and Iraq 2.2%. Looking past the country of birth to residents' self-identified ancestry shows another dimension of this cultural diversity: the most common ancestries were Lebanese 16.2%, Vietnamese 14.5%, Australian 11.9%, English 9.1% and Chinese 9.1%. Less than one third (22.7%) of people spoke English at home; other languages spoken at home included Arabic 23.5%, Vietnamese 15.1%, Mandarin 3.4%, Cantonese 2.9% and Hazaraghi 1.4%.
- The most common response for religion was Islam at 32.8%.

== Detention centre ==
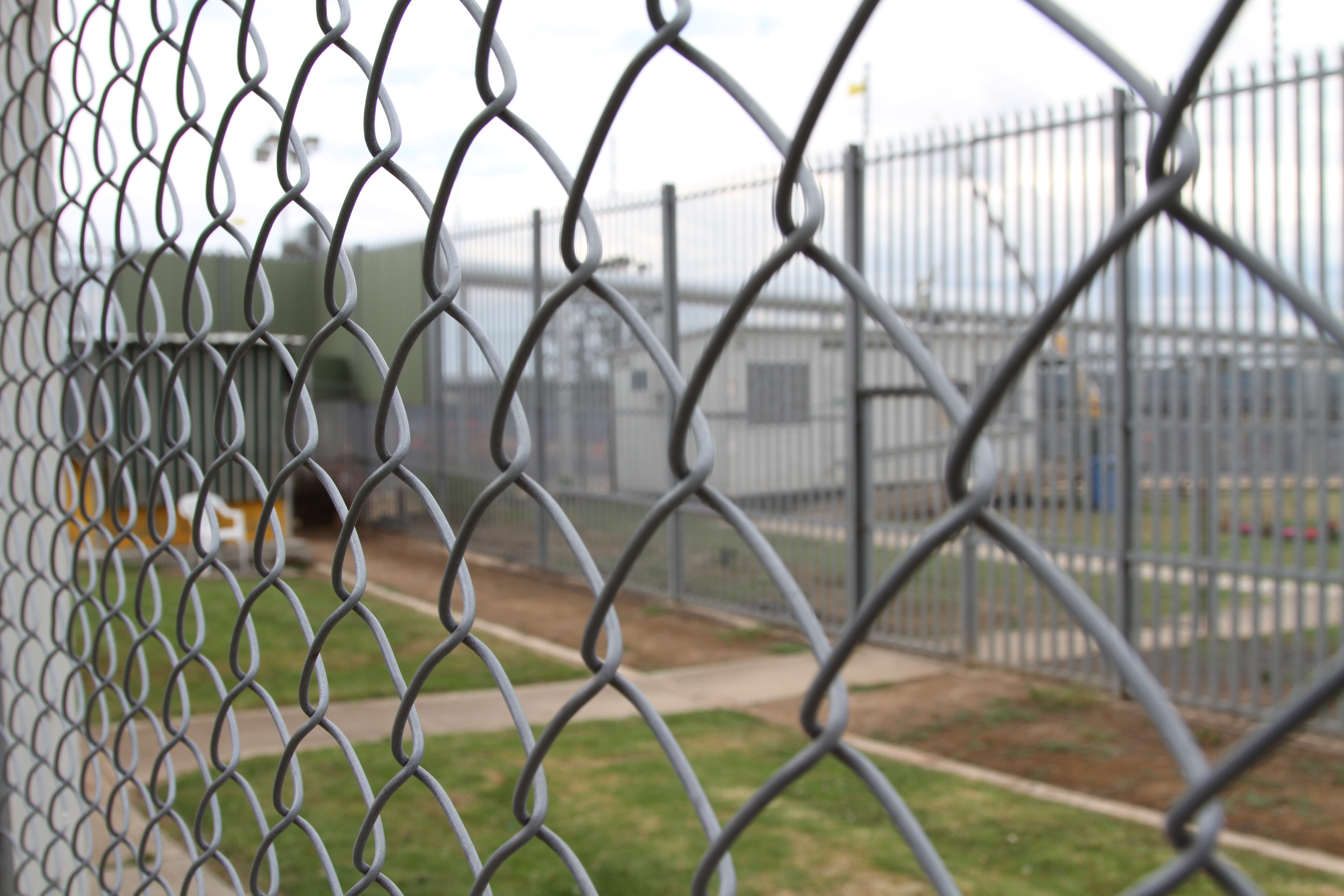
Villawood Detention Centre

The suburb is home to Villawood Immigration Detention Centre, which is situated at 15 Birmingham Avenue. It was originally a hostel, constructed in 1949, to accommodate post-war refugees from Europe. In 1976, a subdivision of the original camp was converted into an immigration detention centre. In addition to housing asylum seekers, people refused entry into the country at international airports and seaports may also be detained in the centre. The site was selected in part because the former Leightonfield munitions factory could be readily converted into temporary accommodation. Its location in Western Sydney, approximately 40 kilometres from the Sydney central business district, has been interpreted by some scholars as reflecting broader patterns in urban planning and migration policy, whereby newly arrived migrants were often housed on the metropolitan fringe. The hostel contributed to the demographic growth and cultural diversity of western Sydney, where many former residents later settled permanently.

The centre has been the focus of much controversy, with accusations of human rights abuses. In January 2008, the Human Rights and Equal Opportunity Commission (HREOC) said the high-security section of Villawood Detention Centre was the "most prison like" of all Australia's immigration detention centres, and demanded it be closed immediately.
