= Chester Hill High School =

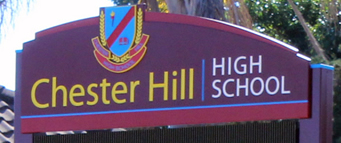

Location
- Kenward Avenue; Chester Hill, New South Wales, 2162; Australia; 33°52′30″S 150°59′40″E

Information
- Motto: Strength in Unity, Excellence in Education
- Established: 1962
- Status: Open
- Principal: Ms M O'Harae
- Gender: Co-educational
- Age range: 12–18
- Enrollment: 1200
- Houses: Florey, Glenn, Hilary and Murdoch
- Colours: White, maroon and goldish-yellow
- Nickname: Cheso
- Website: chesterhil-h.schools.nsw.gov.au

Chester Hill High School is a high school located in Chester Hill, New South Wales, Australia. It caters for students from years 7 to 12. Classes began on 4 February 1962 with 325 students. The school was officially opened on 1 March 1965 by Jack Renshaw, the Premier of New South Wales. The principal is Ms M O'Harae.

In 2003, Chester Hill was one of eight schools in New South Wales recognized with a Cohesive Community School Award special commendation by the New South Wales Department of Education, for "promoting a cohesive community and in making a significant difference to social harmony and unity".

== Sports and traditions ==
In recognition of the varied cultures of its students, the school has held an annual multicultural flag ceremony and concert since 1997. The event in 2005 was attended by students from 68 countries, and New South Wales Governor Marie Bashir addressed the students. 2008's ceremony had 300 students participating and was featured on local television.

== Intensive English Centre ==
Chester Hill High School features an Intensive English Centre (IEC). The program has been cited by the advocacy group ChilOut as an example of a superior educational alternative for children living in Australian immigration detention centres (IDC). The IEC has educated several refugees and asylum-seekers since its inception in 1978.

== Higher School Certificate student achievements ==
Year	Result
2008	HSC All Rounders List
2007	9th in Society and Culture
2006	Selected for Art Express
2004	HSC All Rounders List
2002	HSC All Rounders List
1996	3rd in Modern History (P&E)
1994	4th in Life Management Studies
1994	8th in Mathematics in Practice

== Facilities ==
In 2005, the state spent A$280,000 to upgrade the science laboratories at the school.

== Security ==
In 2002, gang-related violence increased around Chester Hill and other schools in New South Wales. After a Chester Hill High student was shot, the school was one of eight high schools to accept intervention by police and education officials. In an effort to reduce the risk of gang-related violence, Chester Hill made significant security upgrades, installing security fences, in October 1999, and cameras around the school. Despite this, Molotov cocktails were found on the roof of a classroom in June 2008. In 2002 the then New South Wales Opposition leader John Brogden called it a school "in critical need of a full-time police presence."

On 2 June 2009, Daily Telegraph reported bullying in Chester Hill High School, obtaining two videos recorded on mobile phones which depicted students being gangbanged by bullies.

== Notable students ==
- Taip Ramadani (1986–1990) – handballer, Sydney 2000 Olympian
- Kim Ravaillion – netballer
- Khaled Sharrouf – jihadist terrorist, expelled in Year 9
