= Chester Hill railway station =

Railway station in Sydney, New South Wales, Australia

Chester Hill
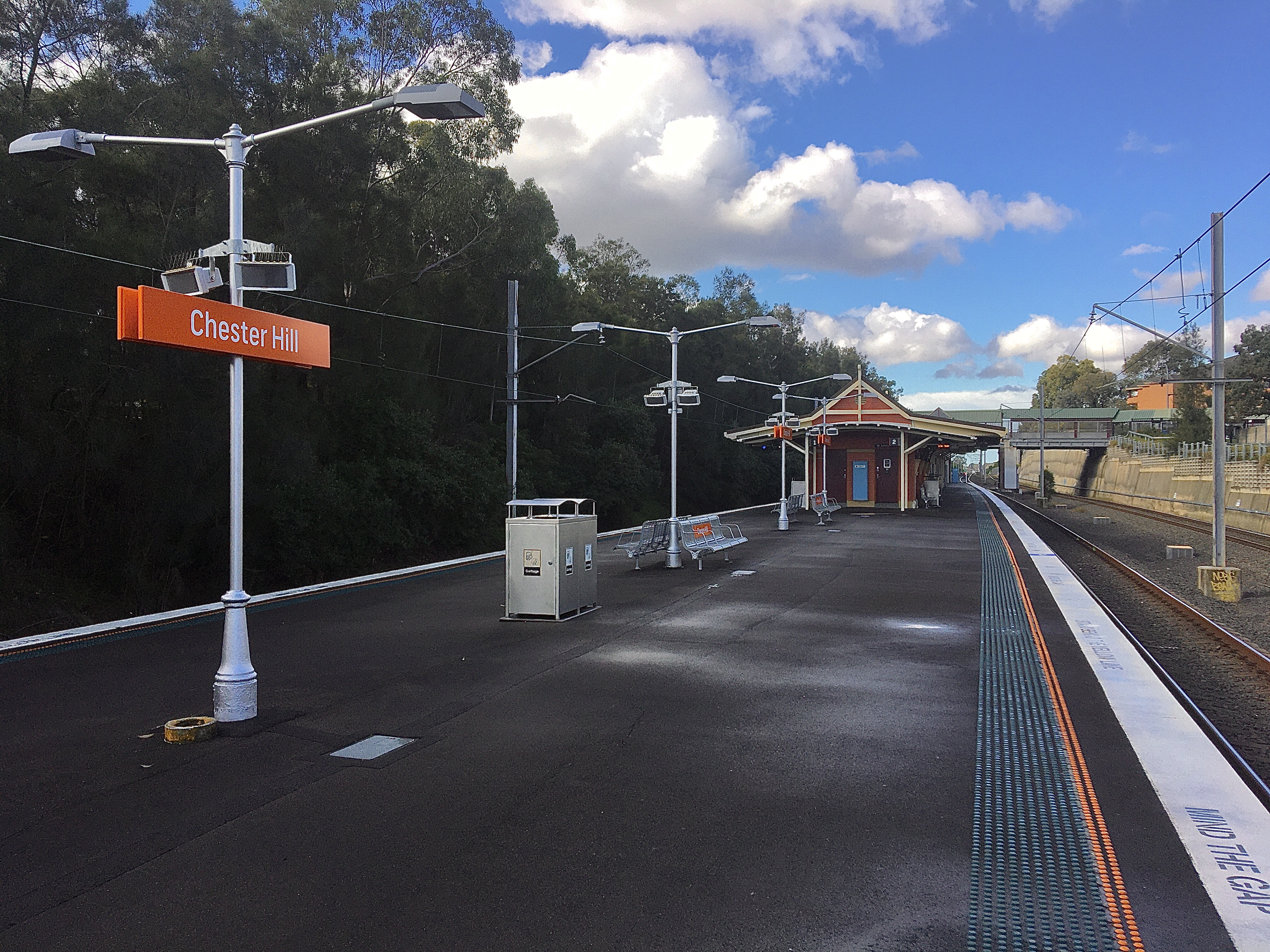
- Looking towards Sefton in June 2020

General information
- Location: Chester Hill Road, Chester Hill; Australia
- Coordinates: 33°53′01″S 150°59′58″E
- Owner: Transport Asset Manager of New South Wales
- Operator: Sydney Trains
- Line: Main Southern
- Distance: 22.31 kilometres (13.86 mi) from Central
- Platforms: 2 (1 island)
- Tracks: 3
- Connections: Bus

Construction
- Structure type: Ground
- Accessible: Yes

Other information
- Status: Weekdays: Staffed: 6am to 7pm: Weekends and public holidays: Staffed: 8am to 4pm
- Station code: CHH
- Website: Transport for NSW

History
- Opened: 8 October 1924

Passengers
- 2025: 582,911 (year); 1,597 (daily) (Sydney Trains)
- Rank: 153

Services
Preceding station	Sydney Trains	Following station
Leightonfield towards Liverpool	T3 Liverpool & Inner West Line	Sefton towards City Circle
Location

Chester Hill railway station is a heritage-listed railway station on the Main Southern railway line in the Sydney suburb of Chester Hill. It is served by Sydney Trains' T3 Liverpool & Inner West Line services.

== History ==
Chester Hill station opened on 8 October 1924 when the Main Southern railway line was extended from Regents Park to Cabramatta.

To the south of the station lies the Southern Sydney Freight Line, which opened in January 2013.

As part of Transport for NSW's Safe Accessible Transport program, construction was undertaken at the station, which included the installation of a new lift, stairs and elevated walkway, as well as platform levelling and the installation of tactile ground surface indicators. These upgrades were completed in July 2026.

== Platforms and services ==
Historically, eastbound services connected Chester Hill to the City Circle via Lidcombe and the Main Suburban railway line. Between 2013 and 2024, eastbound services from Chester Hill to the City Circle ran only via an alternate route along the Bankstown railway line. Following the partial closure of the Bankstown railway line for Sydney Metro conversion in 2024, this situation reverted. Now eastbound services from Chester Hill operate to the City Circle via Lidcombe again, branded as the T3 Liverpool & Inner West Line.

Platform	Line	Stopping pattern	Notes
1	T3 Liverpool & Inner West Line	services to Central & the City Circle via Regents Park	
2	T3 Liverpool & Inner West Line	services to Liverpool	

== Transport links ==
Transit Systems NSW operates five bus routes via Chester Hill station, under contract to Transport for NSW:

- 911: Bankstown station to Auburn station
- 916: to Guildford station
- M91: Parramatta station to Hurstville
- S2: Sefton to Granville station
- S4: to Fairfield

Chester Hill station is served by one NightRide route:

- N50: Liverpool station to Town Hall station
