= Sefton High School =

Location
- Sefton, Western Sydney, New South Wales; Australia; 33°52′46″S 151°0′32″E

Information
- Type: Government-funded co-educational dual modality partially academically selective and comprehensive secondary day school
- Motto: Sincerity, Scholarship, Service
- Established: 1962; 64 years ago
- Educational authority: New South Wales Department of Education
- Principal: Kevin Humphreys Timothy Mortimer (Deputy) Bill Dimopulos (Deputy)
- Years: 7–12
- Enrolment: ~1,100
- Campus: Sefton
- Colours: Navy blue and black
- Website: sefton-h.schools.nsw.gov.au

Sefton High School is a government-funded co-educational dual modality partially academically selective and comprehensive secondary day school, located in Sefton, a suburb in western Sydney, New South Wales, Australia. Established in 1961, the school caters for approximately 1100, students from Year 7 to Year 12 and is operated by the New South Wales Department of Education.

== Overview ==
The students are a mixture of local students and selected students.

== History ==
Sefton High School received its first students on 30 January 1961, and became academically selective in 1989.

== Notable alumni ==
- Terry Lamb – rugby league player and coach
- Rebecca Rippon – water polo player and Bronze Medal Olympian
- Sally Sitou – Australian Labor Party member for Reid
- Stevie Wright – The Easybeats vocalist
- George Young – The Easybeats guitarist

== See also ==
- List of government schools in New South Wales
- List of selective high schools in New South Wales
