= Sefton railway station =

Railway station in Sydney, New South Wales, Australia

Sefton
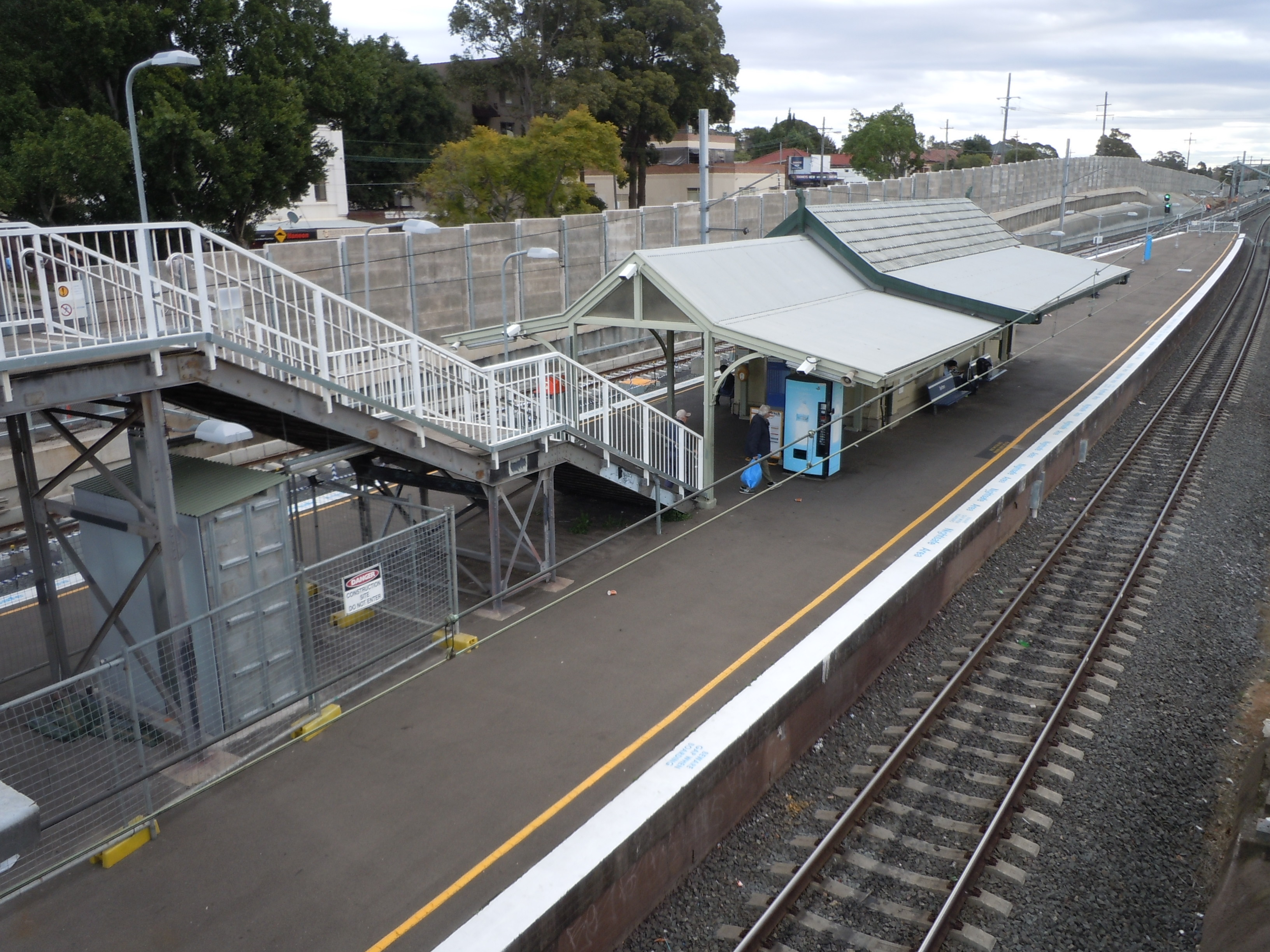
- Southbound view in June 2011

General information
- Location: Wellington Road, Sefton; Australia
- Coordinates: 33°53′07″S 151°00′41″E
- Owner: Transport Asset Manager of New South Wales
- Operator: Sydney Trains
- Line: Main Southern
- Distance: 21.19 kilometres (13.17 mi) from Central
- Platforms: 2 (1 island)
- Tracks: 3
- Connections: Bus

Construction
- Structure type: Ground
- Accessible: Yes

Other information
- Status: Weekdays: Staffed: 6am to 2pm: Weekends and public holidays: Unstaffed
- Station code: SFT
- Website: Transport for NSW

History
- Opened: 19 October 1924

Passengers
- 2025: 436,605 (year); 1,196 (daily) (Sydney Trains)
- Rank: 169

Services
Preceding station	Sydney Trains	Following station
Chester Hill towards Liverpool	Liverpool & Inner West Line	Regents Park towards City Circle
Location

Sefton railway station is a heritage-listed railway station on the Main Southern railway line in the Sydney suburb of Sefton. It is served by Sydney Trains' T3 Liverpool & Inner West Line services.

== History ==
Sefton station opened on 19 October 1924 when the Lidcombe to Regents Park line was extended to Cabramatta to become part of the Main Southern railway line. The station building is of a characteristic standard design from the 1920s and 1930s. The station was further expanded in the following years, with booking and parcels offices installed on the footbridge in 1928.

The station has undergone changes over the years as the importance of the station decreased and its urban context changed. The buildings on the footbridge were removed. Flower boxes, hedges and trees on the platform were removed. An awning was erected at the end of the 20th century to connect the footbridge landing with the main station building. In 2009, as part of the construction of the Southern Sydney Freight Line, major works were carried out in and around the station, including reconstruction of part of the footbridge, and the installation of lifts. The Southern Sydney Freight Line works also added an additional track to the south side of the existing station, but with no platform.

The station is heritage-listed in the state heritage register for New South Wales.

== Platforms and services ==
From its opening, eastbound services connected Sefton to Central via Lidcombe and the Main Suburban railway line. From 1928, the connection of the Bankstown railway line to the Main Southern railway line at Sefton Park Junction provided an alternate route to Central and the City Circle via Bankstown as well. Between 2013 and 2024, eastbound services from Sefton to the City Circle ran only via Bankstown. Following the partial closure of the Bankstown railway line for Sydney Metro conversion in 2024, this situation reverted. Now eastbound services from Sefton operate to the City Circle via Lidcombe again, branded as the T3 Liverpool & Inner West Line.

Platform	Line	Stopping pattern	Notes
1	Liverpool & Inner West Line	services to Central & the City Circle via Regents Park	
2	Liverpool & Inner West Line	services to Liverpool	

== Transport links ==
Sefton station is served by one NightRide route:

- N50: Liverpool station to Town Hall station

== Trackplan ==
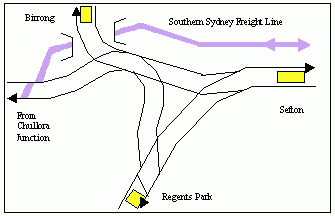
Nearby is the more complicated Sefton Park Junction, which is a triangle, with an additional freight only spur, passenger trains operate on all three sides of the triangle
