= Leightonfield railway station =

Railway station in Sydney, New South Wales, Australia

Leightonfield
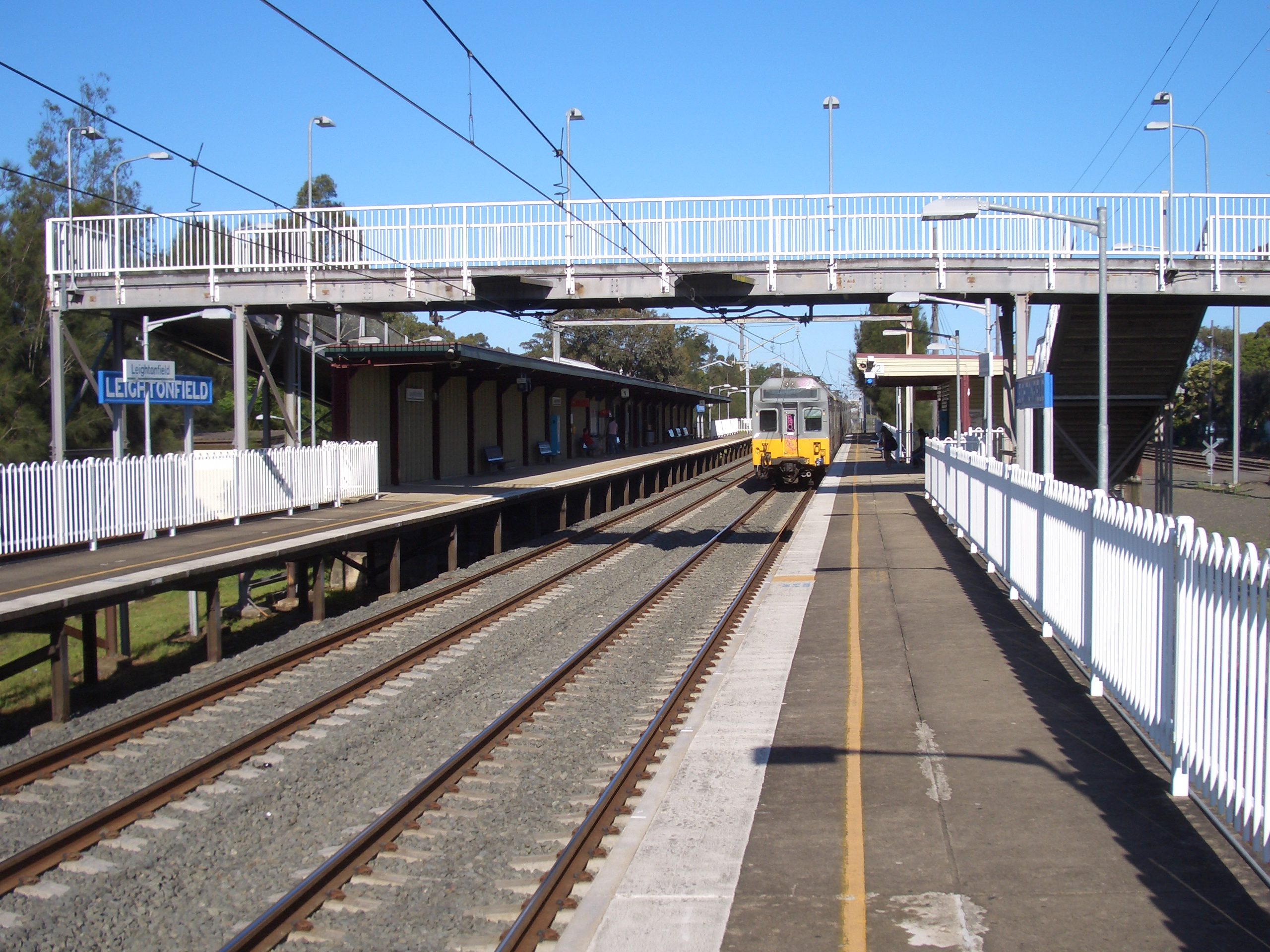
- Eastbound view in November 2007

General information
- Location: Christina Road, Villawood; Australia
- Coordinates: 33°52′53″S 150°59′05″E
- Owner: Transport Asset Manager of New South Wales
- Operator: Sydney Trains
- Line: Main Southern
- Distance: 23.67 kilometres (14.71 mi) from Central
- Platforms: 2 side
- Tracks: 4

Construction
- Structure type: Ground
- Accessible: No

Other information
- Status: Weekdays: Staffed: 6am to 2pm: Weekends and public holidays: Unstaffed
- Station code: LHF
- Website: Transport for NSW

History
- Opened: 24 August 1942

Passengers
- 2025: 126,032 (year); 345 (daily) (Sydney Trains)
- Rank: 204

Services
Preceding station	Sydney Trains	Following station
Villawood towards Liverpool	T3 Liverpool & Inner West Line	Chester Hill towards City Circle
Location

Leightonfield railway station is a heritage-listed railway station on the Main Southern railway line in the Sydney suburb of Villawood. It is served by Sydney Trains' T3 Liverpool & Inner West Line services.

== History ==
Leightonfield station opened on 24 August 1942 to service the adjacent munitions factory, which contributed to Australia's war effort in World War II. It was transferred from Federal to State Government ownership on 1 February 1962.

To the south of the station lies the Southern Sydney Freight Line, which opened in January 2013.

== Platforms and services ==
Historically, eastbound services connected Leightonfield to the City Circle via Lidcombe and the Main Suburban railway line. Between 2013 and 2024, eastbound services from Leightonfield to the City Circle ran only via an alternate route along the Bankstown railway line. Following the partial closure of the Bankstown railway line for Sydney Metro conversion in 2024, this situation reverted. Now eastbound services from Leightonfield operate to the City Circle via Lidcombe again, branded as the T3 Liverpool & Inner West Line.

Platform	Line	Stopping pattern	Notes
1	T3 Liverpool & Inner West Line	services to Central & the City Circle via Regents Park	
2	T3 Liverpool & Inner West Line	services to Liverpool	

== Transport links ==
Leightonfield station is served by one NightRide route:

- N50: Liverpool station to Town Hall station
