= Sefton, New South Wales =

Sefton
- Suburb
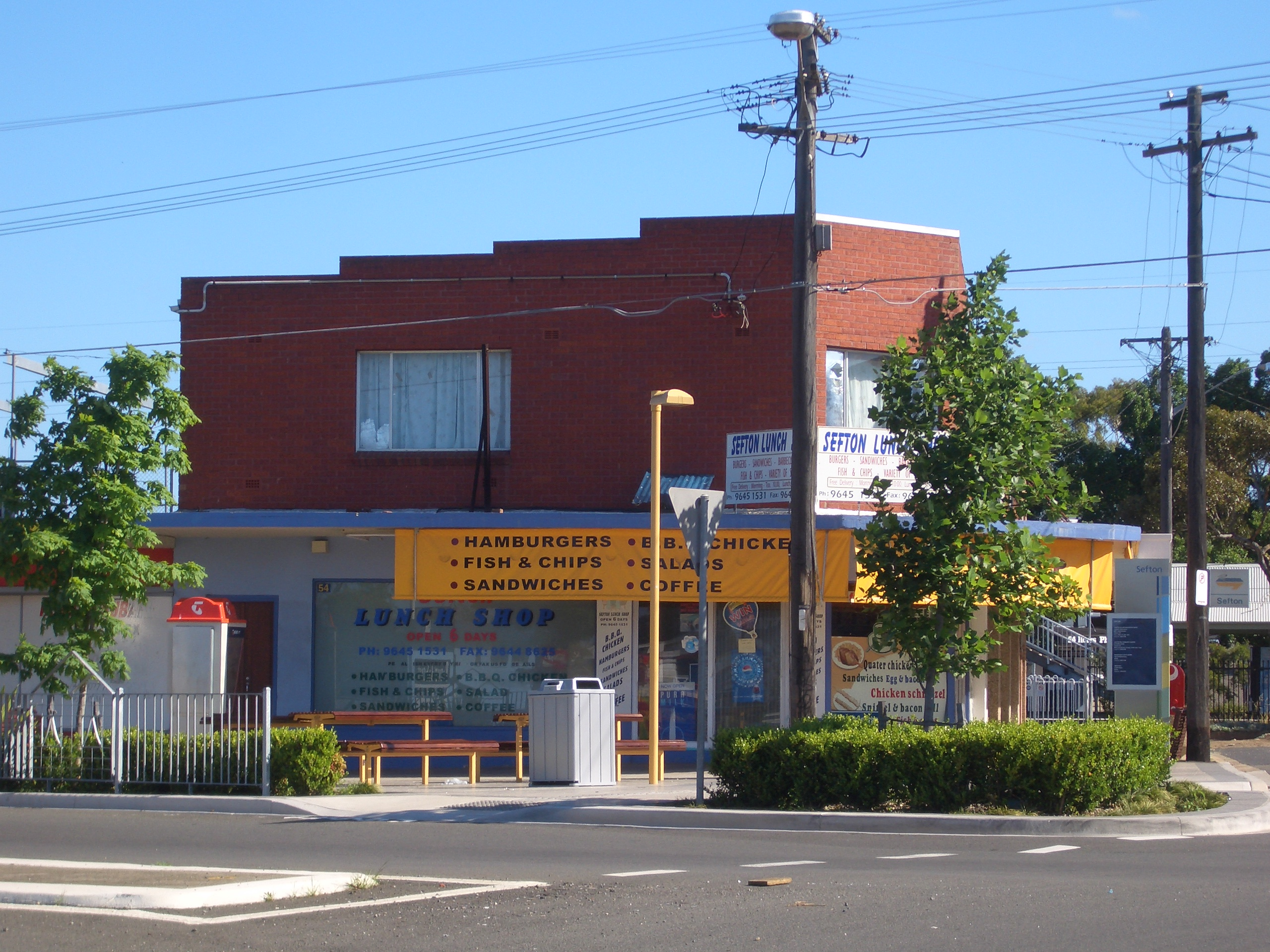
- Carlingford Street, Sefton

- Interactive map of Sefton
- Country: Australia
- State: New South Wales
- City: Sydney
- LGA: City of Canterbury-Bankstown
- Location: 23 km (14 mi) west of Sydney CBD

Government
  - State electorate: Bankstown
  - Federal division: Blaxland
- Elevation: 32 m (105 ft)

Population
  - Total: 6,300 (2021 census)
- Postcode: 2162
Suburbs around Sefton
Guildford	South Granville	Auburn
Chester Hill	Sefton	Regents Park
Bass Hill	Yagoona	Birrong

Sefton is a suburb in Western Sydney, Australia. It is located 23 kilometres west of the Sydney central business district, in New South Wales, Australia. It shares the 2162 postcode with the neighbouring suburb of Chester Hill.

== History ==
The name Sefton was taken from Sefton in Merseyside, England. James Wood gave the name 'Sefton Park' to the 340 acres (1.4 km^{2}) of land granted to him in 1839. Prior to subdivision, Sefton was an area of market gardens, orchards and poultry farms. It was the birthplace of property group Stockland in 1952, when founder Ervin Graf undertook a development project of 19 houses in the suburb.

== Transport ==
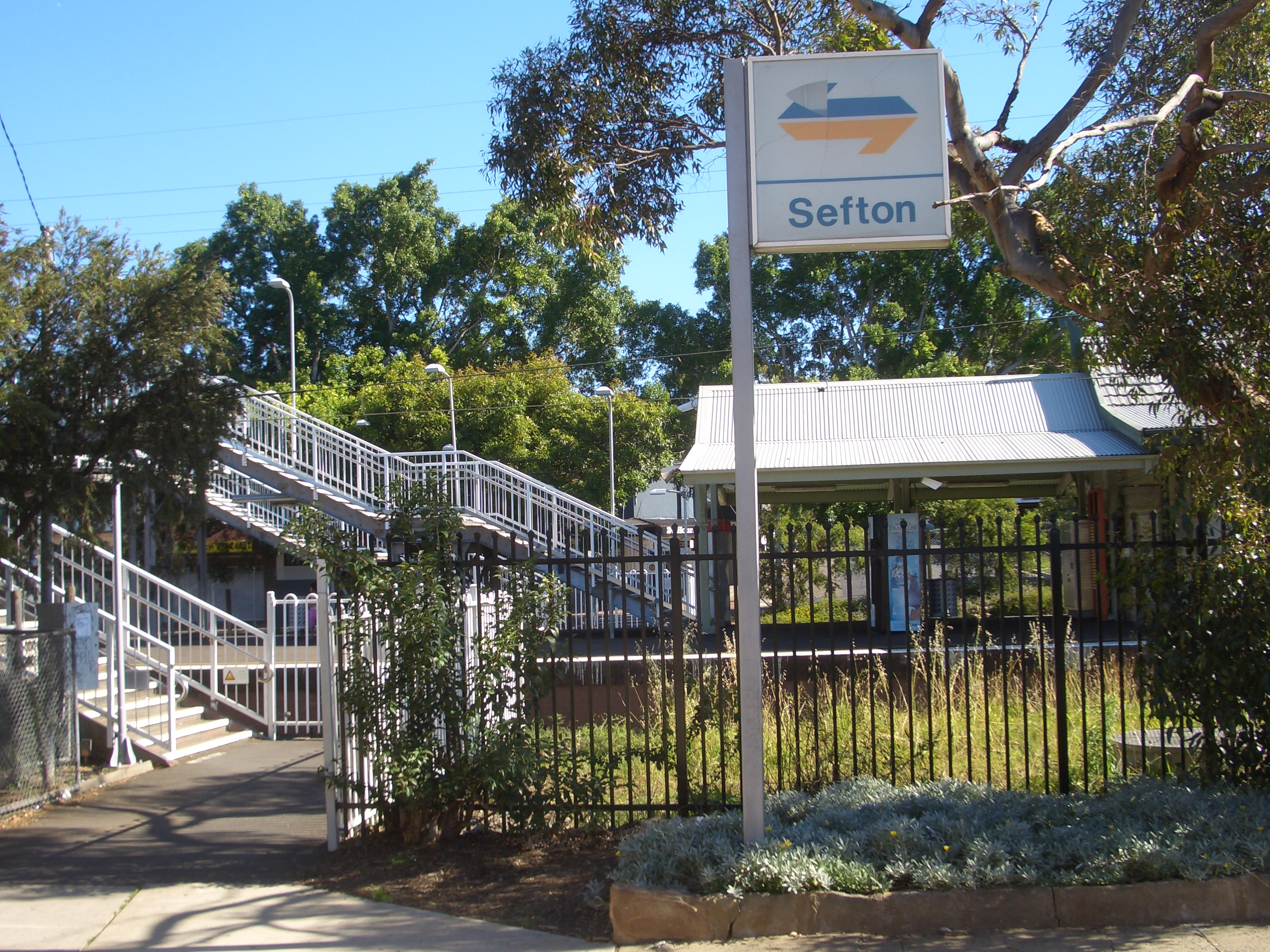
Sefton railway station

Sefton railway station is on the Main Southern railway line.

== Commercial area ==
There is a small shopping centre clustered around it which is made up of Sefton Growers Market, Sefton Newsagency and a Thai/Australian bistro.

== Schools ==
Sefton Infants School is a small public school for years kindergarten to year 2 and pre-school. Sefton High School is a co-educational—partially selective—high school with just over 1,000 students. The selective-school section operates from years 7–10. Years 11–12 are integrated into the community section of the school. Immaculate Heart of Mary Catholic School is a co-educational primary school catering from kindergarten to year 6 and is adjacent to the Immaculate Heart of Mary Church.

== Sport and recreation ==
A number of sporting facilities are located around Sefton. This includes Jensen Oval and Sefton Golf Course. Sefton Golf Course is a council-owned 18-hole par-3 course on 15.6 hectares and is open all year round. Bankstown City Lions Football Club plays their home games at Jensen Park.

== Population ==
In the 2021 Census, there were 6,300 people in Sefton. 47.5% of people were born in Australia. The next most common countries of birth were Vietnam 14.0%, Lebanon 7.0%, China 4.5%, Afghanistan 1.6% and Pakistan 1.6%. The most common reported ancestries were Lebanese 17.2%, Vietnamese 17.1%, Chinese 14.5%, Australian 13.0% and English 8.7%. 25.3% of people spoke only English at home. Other languages spoken at home included Arabic 21.5%, Vietnamese 17.8%, Cantonese 5.3%, Mandarin 4.6% and Urdu 1.9%. The most common responses for religion were Islam 32.5%, Catholic 16.6%, No Religion 16.1% and Buddhism 12.8%.

== Politics ==
At the state level, Sefton is part of the electoral district of Bankstown. At the federal level, Sefton is part of the electoral Division of Blaxland.

== Culture ==
In 2008, Sefton was a filming location for the international, award-winning and critically acclaimed television drama series East West 101.

In 2015, Sefton and Chester Hill had the second-highest number of registered firearms in Sydney, after Liverpool, with 4,505 guns held by 2,283 people.
