= Bass Hill =

- Suburb
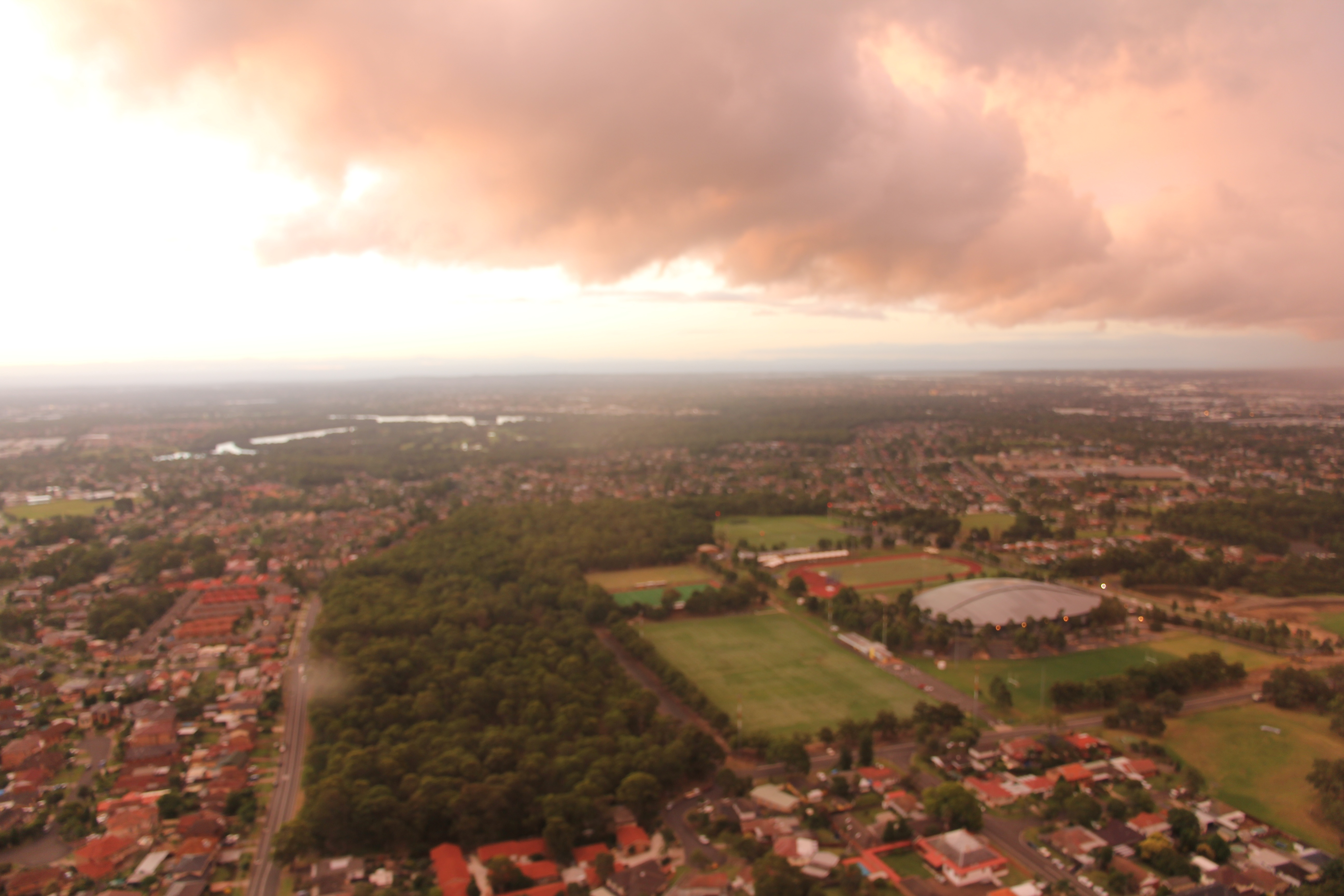
- Aerial photograph of Bass Hill with Dunc Gray Velodrome and The Crest sporting precinct

- Interactive map of Bass Hill
- Coordinates: 33°54′03″S 150°59′42″E
- Country: Australia
- State: New South Wales
- City: Sydney
- LGA: City of Canterbury-Bankstown
- Location: 23 km (14 mi) south-west of Sydney CBD
- Established: 1924

Government
  - State electorates: Bankstown; Fairfield
  - Federal divisions: Blaxland; Watson
- Elevation: 33 m (108 ft)

Population
  - Total: 10,230 (2021 census)
- Postcode: 2197
Suburbs around Bass Hill
Villawood	Chester Hill	Sefton
Lansdowne	Bass Hill	Yagoona
Bankstown Aerodrome	Georges Hall	Condell Park

Bass Hill, (/bæs hɪl/) is a suburb in South-western Sydney in the state of New South Wales, Australia. It is part of the local government area of City of Canterbury-Bankstown, and is located 23 kilometres south-west of the Sydney central business district.

== History ==
Bass Hill is named after George Bass, a surgeon and explorer who was granted land here in 1798. He had arrived in the colony in 1795 on HMS Reliance and became friendly with midshipman Matthew Flinders and on arrival they decided to explore parts of the colony. In 1796 on a small boat called the Tom Thumb accompanied by a boy servant William Martin, they sailed into Botany Bay and explored the Georges River, twenty miles (32 km) beyond previous expeditions. They sailed as far as present day Georges Hall. For their exploration efforts Bass and Flinders were rewarded with 100-acre (0.40 km^{2}) land grants in this area by Governor Hunter.

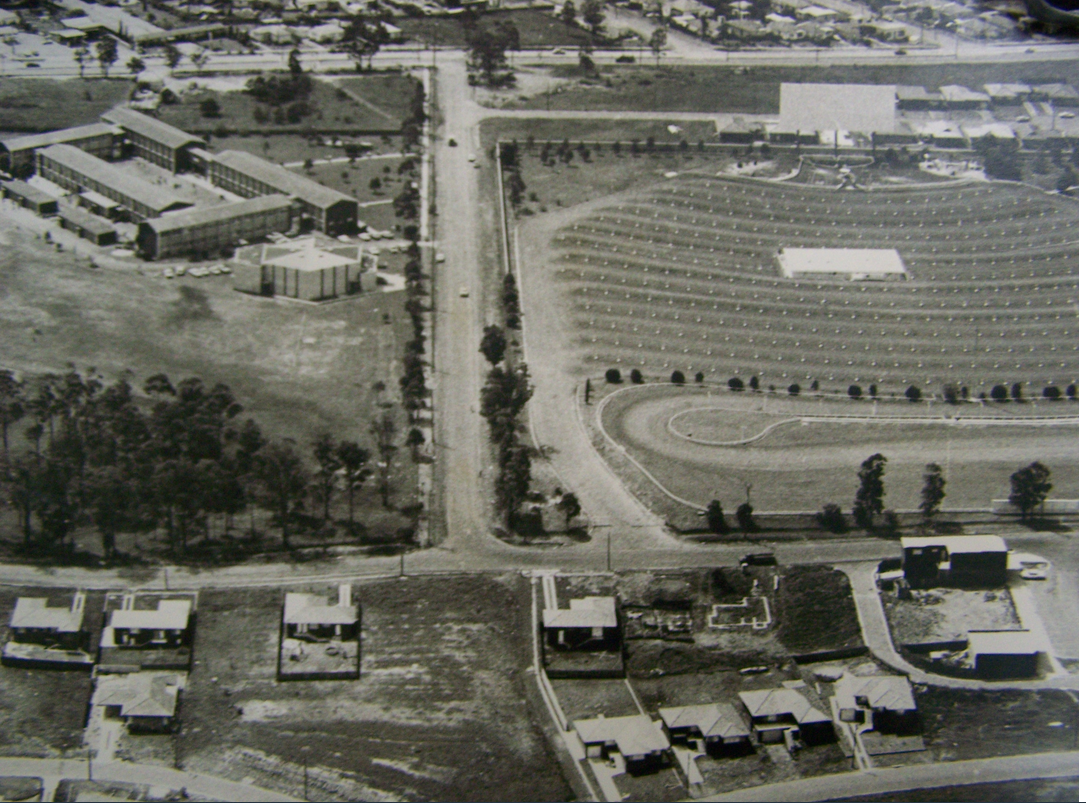
Aeria view of Bass Hill showing Bass High School and the Skyline Drive-In c. 1958

The area developed rapidly after the completion of Liverpool Road in 1814. Originally known as Irish Town because of the Irish settlements, it later became known as Upper Bankstown. It became officially known as Bass Hill in October 1924.

During World War II, Bass Hill was the location for a small transmitting station that was owned and operated by the RAAF. It was located on the corner of Manuka Crescent & Johnston Road. This facility worked in conjunction with the Bankstown Bunker on Black Charlies Hill in Marion Street, Condell Park, which also worked in conjunction with a remote receiving station that was located in Picnic Point.

== Commercial area ==
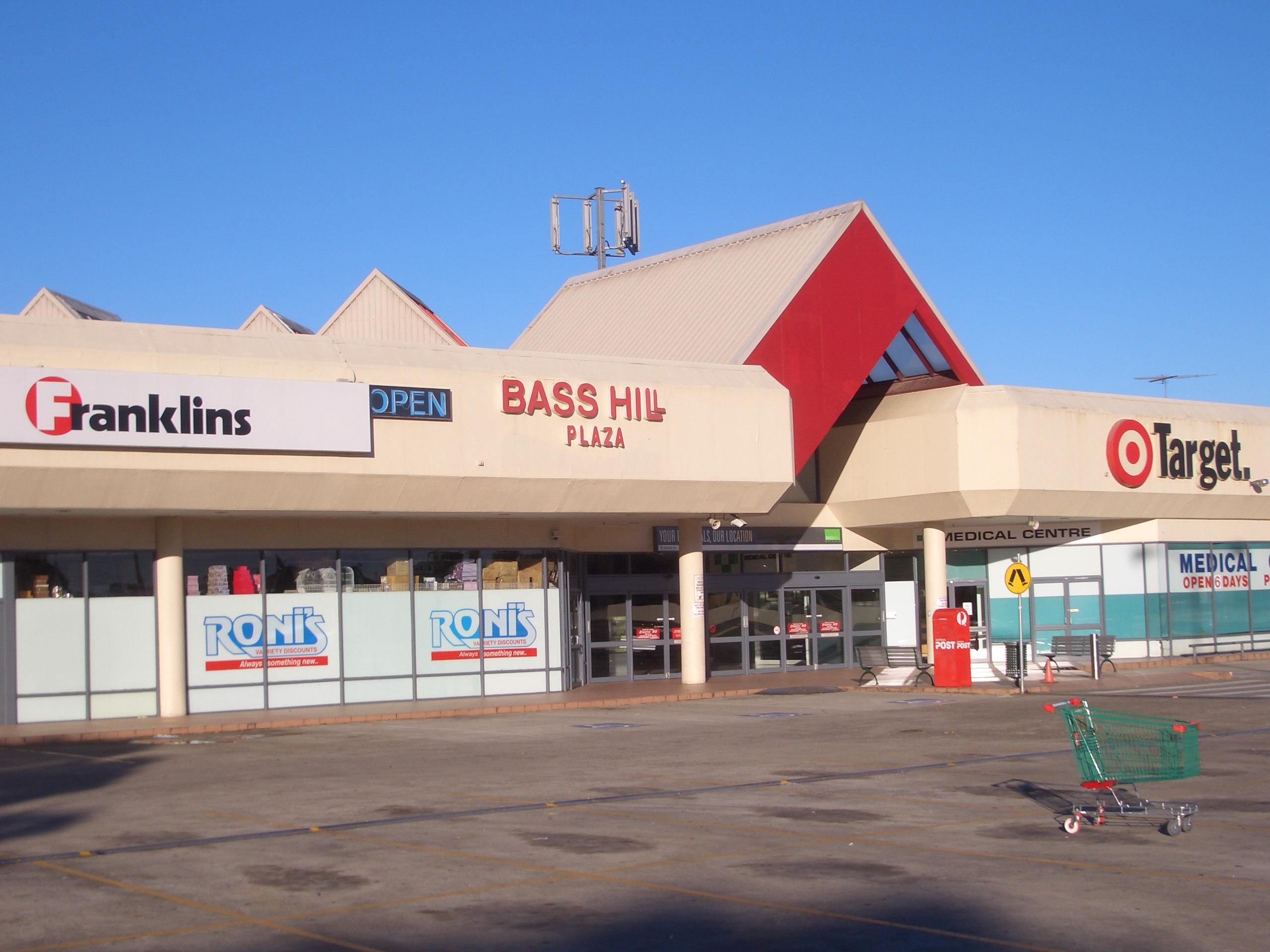
Bass Hill Plaza c. 2007

Bass Hill Plaza is a 20,000 square metres (220,000 sq ft), district size shopping centre at 753 Hume Highway. The shopping centre includes a Woolworths Supermarket, Kmart, Aldi, Medical Centre, Post Office and approximately 60 specialty stores.

Adjacent to the centre was the Skyline drive-in cinema, opened in 1956 and closed in 2007. It has been demolished and a housing estate called Viewpoint, now occupies the site.

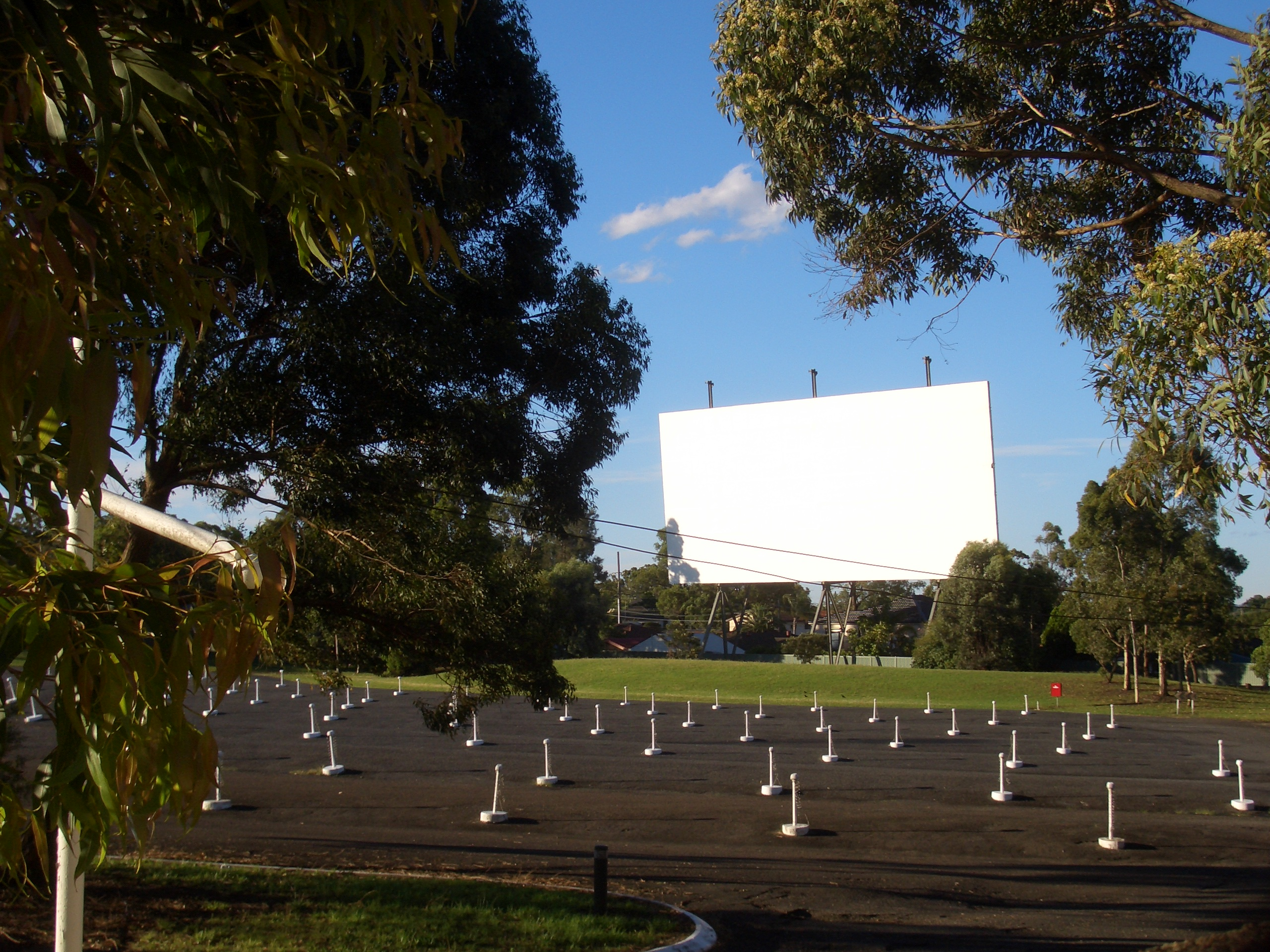
Bass Hill Drive-In Cinema c. 2007

Bass Hill RSL club opened in 1964 and closed in 2019.

== Education ==
Bass Hill has three schools, Bass Hill Public School for years K-6, George Bass School for students with special needs and Bass High School for years 7–12.

== Sport ==
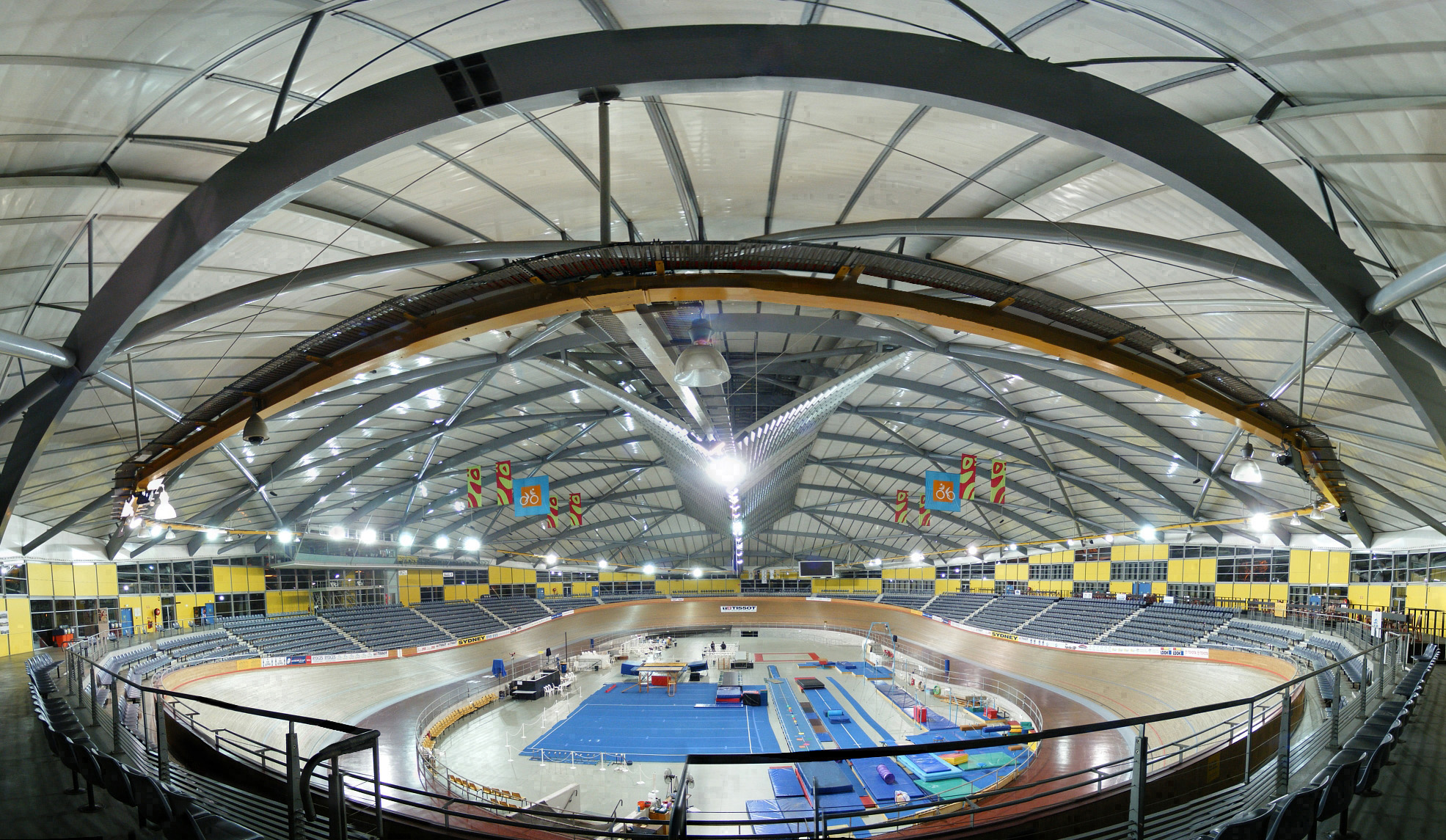
Dunc Gray Velodrome

Bass Hill is home to many sporting fields and facilities which cater for sports such as athletics, cricket, cycling, hockey, rugby league, and soccer.

The Crest sporting complex contains the Dunc Gray Velodrome, which was home of the track cycling events for the 2000 Summer Olympics and the Cycling World Cup, a state of the art athletics complex, soccer fields, hockey fields, and cricket fields. The Crest was home to the Sydney Bulls Jim Beam Cup Rugby League Club, South West Strikers Soccer Club, Bankstown District Sports Club Hockey Club, Banksports Athletics, Bankstown Sports Cycling Club, and Bankstown Sports Gymnastics.

== Population ==
In the 2021 census the population of Bass Hill was 10,230, 50.5% female and 49.5% male.

The median age of the Bass Hill population was 34 years, 4 years below the national median of 38.

56.5% of people were born in Australia. The next most common countries of birth were Lebanon 8.9%, Vietnam 7.9%, Syria 1.4%, Iraq 1.2% and Italy 1.1%.

33.6% of people only spoke English at home. Other languages spoken at home included Arabic 30.5%, Vietnamese 10.1%, Greek 2.1%, Cantonese 1.6% and Italian 1.5%.

The most common responses for religion in Bass Hill were Islam 33.5%, Catholic 22.3% and No Religion 9.1%.
