= Chester Hill =

- Suburb
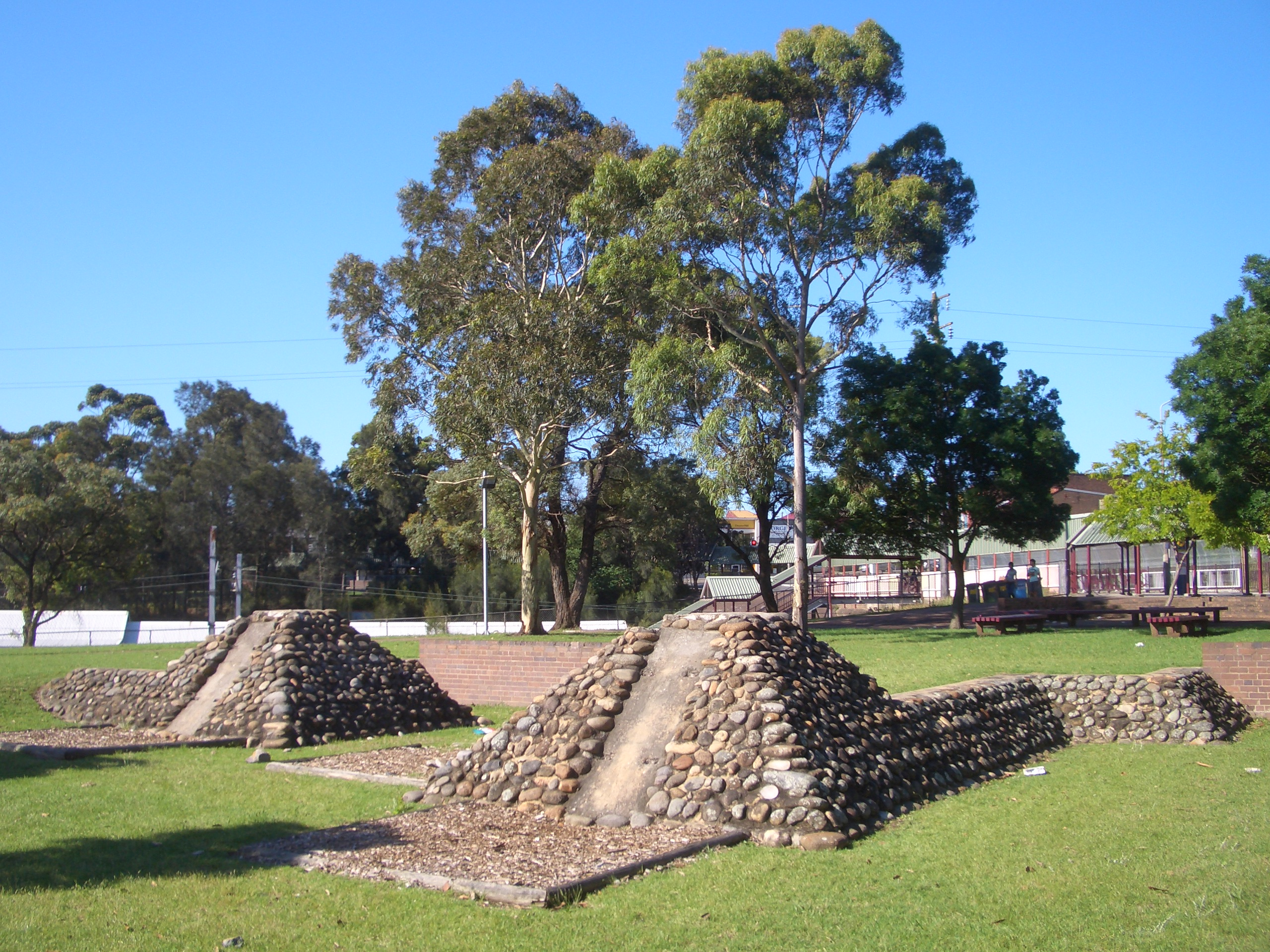
- Nugent Park, Chester Hill

- Interactive map of Chester Hill
- Country: Australia
- State: New South Wales
- City: Sydney
- LGAs: City of Canterbury-Bankstown; Cumberland Council
- Location: 25 km (16 mi) west of Sydney CBD

Government
  - State electorates: Auburn; Bankstown
  - Federal division: Blaxland
- Elevation: 42 m (138 ft)

Population
  - Total: 14,007 (2021 census)
- Postcode: 2162
Suburbs around Chester Hill
Guildford; Old Guildford	South Granville	Auburn
Villawood	Chester Hill	Sefton
Bass Hill	Bass Hill	Bass Hill

Chester Hill is a suburb in Western Sydney in the state of New South Wales, Australia. Chester Hill is mostly in the City of Canterbury-Bankstown, with a minor part in the northeast in the Cumberland Council local government area and is located 25 kilometres west of the Sydney central business district, Chester Hill shares the postcode of 2162 with the neighbouring suburb of Sefton, to the east.

== History ==
An early market garden and orchard area north-west of Bankstown, it developed into a residential and light industrial area after the Regents Park railway line came through in 1924. The construction site of the station was known as Boroya, an Aboriginal word of unknown meaning, but when the station opened on 8 October 1924, it carried the name Chester Hill.

A local resident, Miss H. A. McMillan first suggested that the new railway station should be called Hillcrest (after an estate near Regent's Park), but many objections were raised and the name was discarded. Miss McMillan then suggested Hillchester, after the quaint town of Chester in England, but this also was not well received by the community. Suggesting yet another name, McMillian recommended Chester Hill which was received far better than her previous suggestions.

The area that became Chester Hill was originally the southern part of John Thomas Campbell's Campbell Hill estate, which covered 1,000 acres (4.0 km^{2}) in 1815 between Parramatta, Liverpool and Woodville Roads. Much of this land remained undeveloped until the first subdivision was made in the 1920s when the first shops were also built. The post office opened in July 1934, and the first public school in January 1945.

A significant tract of land between Priam and Hector Streets had been occupied by the Royal Australian Air Force (RAAF) from the 1960s. This area was used for accommodation and mess facilities for the nearby 2 Stores Depot (Regents Park) and the Ground Equipment Maintenance Squadron (Villawood). These properties were disposed of and subsequently acquired first by the Southern Cross Bible College and then by Salamah (Muslim) College.

== Commercial area ==
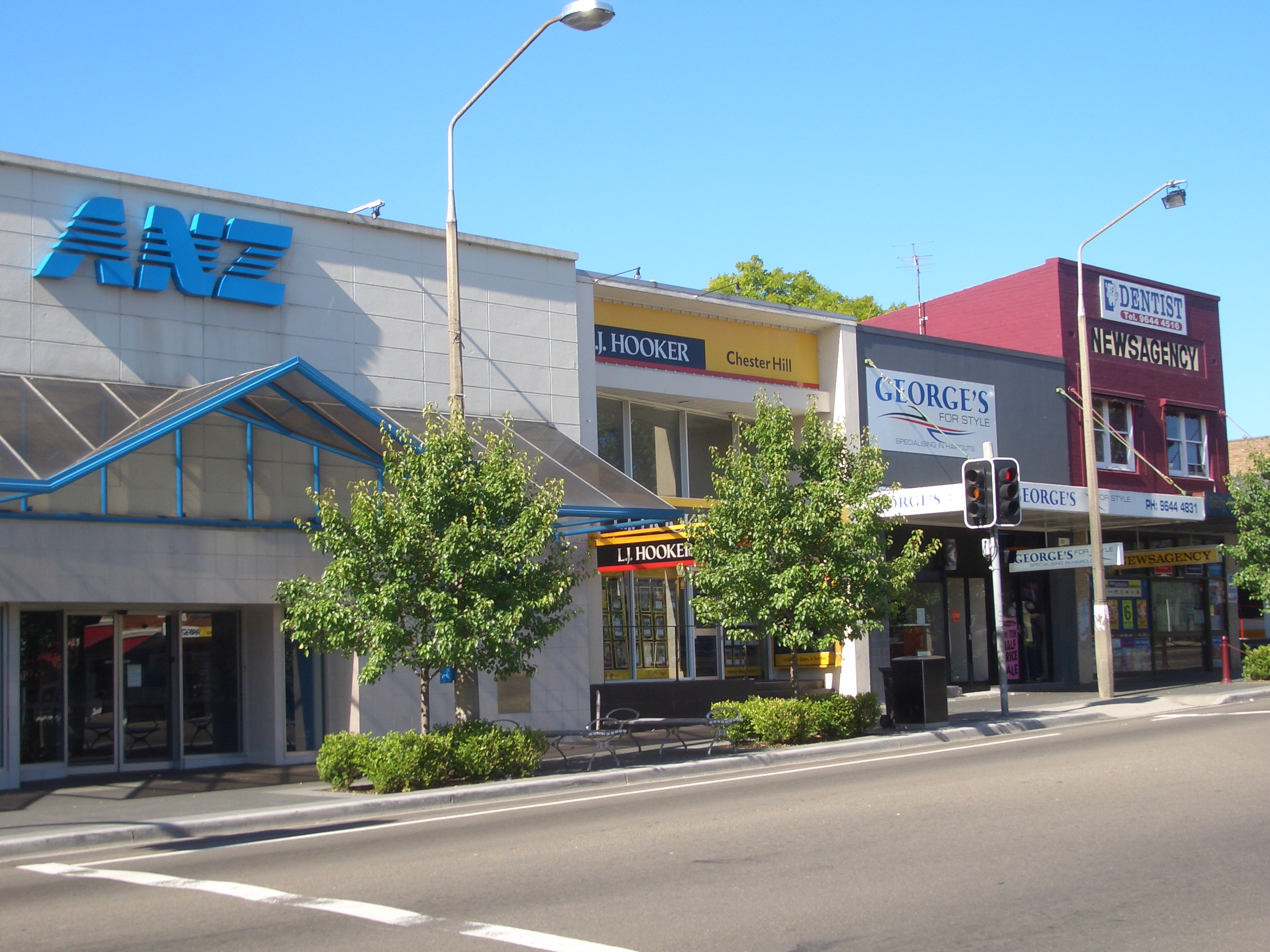
Waldron Road shops

Chester Square in Chester Hill is the main shopping centre, catering for the catchment of Chester Hill, Sefton, Birrong and Bass Hill, and directly situated behind the main road of Waldron Road. Amenities in the suburb include the Chester Hill branch of the Bankstown City Library, Chester Hill Fire Station and a community centre.

== Transport ==
- Chester Hill railway station is on the Main Southern railway line.
- Bus links to Parramatta and Bankstown

== Schools ==
There are five schools in Chester Hill: Chester Hill Public School and Chester Hill North Public School, which cater for Years K-6, Chester Hill High School catering for Years 7–12, Sefton High School which is a partially selective high school also catering for Years 7-12 and Salamah College (sister school of Al Amanah College) established in 2012.

== Parks and recreation ==
Parks in Chester Hill include Campbell Hill Reserve, Everley Park, Nugent Park, the Terry Lamb Complex, which incorporates Frank Bamfield Oval, and Abbott Park which is home to the Chester Hill Youth Cricket Club and Chester Hill Hornets Junior Rugby league Club. Recreational amenities also include an RSL Club, bowling club and community garden.

== Churches ==
Churches in the suburb include St John Mark's Parish Church (Anglican), Proctor Parade (that replaced St Mark's Church, Chester Hill and St John's Church, Sefton), Immaculate Heart of Mary Roman Catholic Church, Proctor Parade (Sefton – but including Chester Hill within its parish), Hope Central Church (formerly Priam, now Christina Road) Campbell Hill Road, St Columba's Presbyterian Church, Baptist Church (both in Priam Street) and Hope Harvest Centre: Christian Mission Fellowship.

== Population ==
=== Demographics ===
According to the 2021 census, there were 14,007 residents in Chester Hill. 49.0% of people were born in Australia. The next most common countries of birth were Vietnam 9.7%, Lebanon 7.5%, China 4.6%, Iraq 1.6% and Afghanistan 1.5%. In Chester Hill 28.2% of people spoke only English at home. Other languages spoken at home included Arabic 25.2%, Vietnamese 11.5%, Mandarin 4.7%, Cantonese 4.1% and Urdu 1.5%. The most common responses for religion were Islam 34.8%, Catholic 15.6%, No Religion 14.1% and Buddhism 9.1%. The median household weekly income in Chester Hill was $1,355, lower than the national median of $1,746.

=== Notable residents ===
- Christian Heim – composer and medical researcher who grew up in Chester Hill
- Terry Lamb – former professional rugby league footballer with the Canterbury-Bankstown Bulldogs and Australian Test side
- Rebecca Rippon – Australian women's water polo player and 2008 Beijing Olympic Games bronze medallist
- Melissa Rippon – Australian women's water polo player winner of a 2008 and 2012 Olympic Games bronze medal
- Ivan Milat – serial killer known for the Backpacker Murders
- Michael McCann (field hockey) – Australian Men's hockey Olympic gold medal (2004 Athens)

== Politics ==
Chester Hill is part of the City of Canterbury-Bankstown. The area to the north of the pipeline is part of the Cumberland Council. For state elections, Chester Hill is split between the electorates of Bankstown and Auburn. Federally, it lies in the division of Blaxland.
