= List of VFL/AFL players with international backgrounds =

This is a list of Australian Football League players who have multicultural ancestry (which includes players born overseas or who had one parent born overseas).

In 2020, about 15 per cent of AFL players were born overseas or had one parent born overseas. This was up from 13 per cent in 2019, according to AFL data. In 2015 season there were 121 multicultural players, more than half had one parent from Anglophone countries, mainly the United Kingdom, Ireland and New Zealand.

== Active players born outside Australia ==
Birthplace	Player	Debut	Current club	Ref.
Kenya	Leek Aleer	2022	Greater Western Sydney	
Kenya	Aliir Aliir	2014	Port Adelaide	
Egypt	Mac Andrew	2022	Gold Coast	
Egypt	James Borlase	2023	Adelaide	
England	Callum Brown	2021	Greater Western Sydney	
South Sudan	Mabior Chol	2016	Hawthorn	
Northern Ireland	Aidan Corr	2013	North Melbourne	
United States	Mason Cox	2015	Fremantle	
South Africa	Neil Erasmus	2022	Fremantle	
England	Connor Idun	2019	Greater Western Sydney	
Ethiopia	Changkuoth Jiath	2018	Melbourne	
Ethiopia	Tew Jiath	2024	Collingwood	
Ireland	Darragh Joyce	2018	North Melbourne	
Ireland	Mark Keane	2019	Adelaide	
South Sudan	Buku Khamis	2019	Western Bulldogs	
Papua New Guinea	Peter Ladhams	2017	Sydney	
Singapore	Josh Lai	2026	Port Adelaide	
New Zealand	Mykelti Lefau	2024	Richmond	
England	Cameron Mackenzie	2023	Hawthorn	
New Zealand	Rowan Marshall	2017	St Kilda	
Canada	Andrew McGrath	2017	Essendon	
Ireland	Conor McKenna	2015	Brisbane Lions	
Ireland	Oisín Mullin	2023	Geelong	
United States	Conor Nash	2017	Hawthorn	
Ireland	Liam O'Connell	2025	St Kilda	
Ireland	Mark O'Connor	2017	Geelong	
Papua New Guinea	Bruce Reville	2024	Brisbane Lions	
Ghana	Brandon Walker	2021	Fremantle	
England	Josh Worrell	2021	Adelaide	

== Africa ==
=== Egypt ===
- Mac Andrew (born in Egypt to South Sudanese parents)
- James Borlase (born in Egypt to Australian parents)
- Anthony Koutoufides (Egyptian-born father, Italian mother)
- Ahmed Saad (Egyptian parents)

=== Ethiopia ===
- Josh Draper (Ethiopian mother)
- Changkuoth Jiath (born in Ethiopia to South Sudanese parents)
- Tew Jiath (born in Ethiopia to South Sudanese parents)

=== Ghana ===
- Joel Amartey (Ghanaian father)
- Connor Idun (Ghanaian father)
- Isaac Quaynor (Ghanaian father)
- Brandon Walker (born in Ghana)

=== Kenya ===
- Aliir Aliir (born in Kenya to South Sudanese parents)
- Bigoa Nyuon (born in Kenya to South Sudanese parents)
- Leek Aleer (born in Kenya to South Sudanese parents)

=== Nigeria ===
- Joel Wilkinson (Nigerian father)

=== Seychelles ===
- Matt Thomas (Seychellois mother)

=== South Africa ===
- Jack Baggott (born in South Africa)
- Connor Ballenden (South African mother)
- Ted Clohesy (South African mother)
- Damian Cupido
- Jack Darling (father born in South Africa)
- Neil Erasmus (born in South Africa)
- Jason Johannisen (born in South Africa; Zambian mother, South African father)
- Eugene Kruger (born in South Africa)
- Stephen Lawrence
- Ryan Lester (South African-born father)
- Cameron Mackenzie (South African father)
- Ian Muller

=== Sudan and South Sudan ===
- Aliir Aliir (born in Kenya to Sudanese parents)
- Mac Andrew (born in Egypt to South Sudanese parents)
- Mabior Chol (born in South Sudan)
- Martin Frederick (South Sudanese Parents)
- Michael Frederick (South Sudanese Parents)
- Buku Khamis (born in South Sudan)
- Majak Daw (born in Sudan)
- Changkuoth Jiath (born in Ethiopia to South Sudanese parents)
- Tew Jiath (born in Ethiopia to South Sudanese parents)
- Luamon Lual (South Sudanese parents)
- Bigoa Nyuon (born in Kenya to South Sudanese parents)
- Reuben William (born in South Sudan)

=== Zimbabwe ===
- Tendai Mzungu (Zimbabwean father)
- Ian Perrie (born in Zimbabwe)

== Americas ==
=== Barbados ===
- Josh Gibson (Bajan father)

=== Brazil ===
- Heritier Lumumba (born in Brazil; Congolese father, Brazilian mother)
- Christian Moraes (Brazilian father)

=== Canada ===
- Mike Pyke (born in Canada)
- Cameron Mackenzie (Canadian mother)
- Andrew McGrath (born in Canada)

=== Chile ===
- Jose Romero (born in Chile)
- Tim Kelly (Chilean mother)

=== Cuba ===
- Leo Lombard (Cuban father)

=== Jamaica ===
- Callum Brown (born in England to Jamaican father)

=== Peru ===
- Nick Shipley (Peruvian mother)

=== United States ===
- Peter F. Bell (Native American father)
- Zac Clarke (American father)
- Mason Cox (born in the United States)
- Elliott Himmelberg
- Harrison Himmelberg
- Jason Holmes (born in the United States)
- Finnbar Maley (American-born father)
- Touk Miller (American father)
- Conor Nash (born in the United States)
- Don Pyke (born in the United States)
- Archie Smith (footballer, born 1995) (American-born mother)
- Tim Taranto (American father)
- Sanford Wheeler (born in the United States)

== Asia ==
=== China ===
- Connor Downie (Chinese mother)
- Ernie Foo (Chinese parents)
- Lin Jong (Taiwanese mother; Timorese-Chinese father)
- Wally Koochew (Chinese father and Norwegian mother)
- Dannie Seow (born in Singapore; Chinese father)
- George Tansing (Chinese father)
- Jack Wunhym (Chinese father)

=== East Timor ===
- Lin Jong (Taiwanese mother, Timorese-Chinese father)
- Jarvis Pina

=== Hong Kong ===
- Cameron Polson (born in Hong Kong)

=== India ===
- Daniel Kerr (Anglo-Indian father)
- Jordan McMahon
- Ben McNiece (Anglo-Indian mother)
- Alex Morgan (Indian parent)
- Clancee Pearce (Indian mother)
- Fred Pringle (born in India)
- Alex Silvagni (Anglo-Indian mother)

=== Indonesia ===
- Dylan Patterson (Indonesian mother)

=== Iraq ===
- Isaac Kako (parents born in Iraq)

=== Israel and Palestine ===
- Mordy Bromberg
- Ezra Poyas
- Ian Synman

=== Japan ===
- Alex Davies (Japanese mother)
- Mitchito Owens (Japanese mother)

=== Lebanon ===
- Hussien El Achkar (Lebanese father)
- Bachar Houli (Lebanese parents)
- Mil Hanna (born in Lebanon)
- Robin Nahas (Lebanese parents)
- Adam Saad (Lebanese parents)
- Christian Salem (Lebanese father)

=== Malaysia ===
- Paul Medhurst (English father, Malaysian mother)

=== Myanmar ===
- Andrew Embley (Anglo-Burmese father)
- Trent Dennis-Lane (Anglo-Burmese father)

=== Philippines ===
- Alex Woodward (Filipino mother)
- Reef McInnes (Filipino mother)

=== South Korea ===
- Peter F. Bell (born in Korea; mother born in South Korea, father born in America)

=== Sri Lanka ===
- Hayden Crozier (Sri Lankan father)
- Craig Jacotine (Sri Lankan parents)
- Enrico Misso (Sri Lankan parents)
- Archie Ludowyke (Sri Lankan father)
- Cooper Duff-Tytler (Sri Lankan father)

=== Singapore ===
- Josh Lai (born in Singapore to Singaporean father)

=== Taiwan ===
- Lin Jong (Taiwanese mother, Timorese-Chinese father)

=== Thailand ===
- Sudjai Cook (born in Thailand)

=== Vietnam ===
- Jayden Nguyen (Vietnamese parents)

== Europe ==
=== Albania ===
- Adem Yze

=== Austria ===
- Alex Jesaulenko (born in Salzburg, but of Ukrainian and Russian ancestry)
- Justin Leppitsch (Austrian-born father)

=== Belarus ===
- Oleg Markov (born in Belarus)

=== Croatia ===
- Jason Akermanis (Croatian father)
- Alan Didak (parents born in Croatia)
- Jon Dorotich
- Gordon Fode (Croatian parents)
- Ray Gabelich
- Darren Gaspar (Croatian parents)
- Ilija Grgic
- Allen Jakovich
- Glen Jakovich
- Addam Maric (Croat father)
- Ivan Maric (parents born in Croatia)
- Brody Mihocek (Croatian father)
- Mark Nicoski (Croat mother, Macedonian father)
- Val Perovic (born in Croatia)
- Steven Salopek (parents born in Croatia)
- Ivan Soldo (parents born in Croatia)
- Jacob Surjan (Croatian parents)

=== Cyprus ===
- Andrew Demetriou (Cypriot parents)

=== Czech Republic ===
- Paul Vinar (born in Czechoslovakia)f

=== Denmark ===
- Tom Boyd (Danish mother)
- Jim Marchbank (Danish father)

=== Estonia ===
- Dane Rampe (Estonian father)

=== France ===
- Brant Colledge (born in France)
- Allan La Fontaine

=== Germany ===
- Niels Becker (born in Germany)
- Neville Bruns
- Otto Buck
- Wolfgang Dietrich
- Carl Ditterich
- Herman Dohrmann
- Jordan Doering
- Wels Eicke
- Harry Frei (born in Germany)
- Fraser Gehrig
- Phil Gehrig
- Darryl Gerlach
- Don Grossman
- George Heinz
- Aaron Henneman
- Steve Hoffman
- Carl Keller
- Justin Koschitzke
- Harry Lampe (German father)
- Bruce Lindner
- Stewart Loewe
- David Neitz
- Jack Riewoldt (German father)
- Nick Riewoldt (German father)
- Alex Ruscuklic
- Paul Schmidt
- Adam Schneider
- John Schultz
- Michael Schulze
- David Schwarz (German father)
- Charlie Schunke
- Ernie Schunke
- Conrad ten Brink
- Dean Terlich
- Heinz Tonn (Born in Germany)
- Jack Ziebell

=== Greece ===
- Thomas Anastasopoulos
- Luke Beveridge (Greek mother)
- Ang Christou
- Peter Daicos (Greek Macedonian parents)
- Andrew Demetriou
- Josh Francou
- Oliver Francou
- Gary Frangalas
- Nick Gelavis
- John Georgiades
- Mitch Georgiades
- Alexis Georgiou
- John Georgiou
- Con Gorozidis
- Athas Hrysoulakis
- Peter Kanis
- Arthur Karanicolas
- Patrick Karnezis
- Max Kondogiannis
- Paul Koulouriotis
- Spiro Kourkoumelis
- Anthony Koutoufides
- George Lakes (parents born in Greece)
- Angelo Lekkas
- Stephen Malaxos
- Spiro Malakellis
- Tony Malakellis
- Alex Marcou
- Daniel Metropolis
- Russell Morris
- Albert Pannam
- Alby Pannam
- Charlie H. Pannam
- Charlie E. Pannam
- Chris Pavlou
- Phil Poursanidis
- Tony Spassopoulos
- John Rombotis
- Blake Thredgold (Greek mother)
- Jimmy Toumpas
- Jason Traianidis
- Elijah Tsatas
- James Tsitas
- Zeno Tzatzaris
- Vasil Varlamos
- David Zaharakis (Greek father)

=== Hungary ===
- Patrick Veszpremi (Hungarian father)

=== Ireland ===
- Bill Ahern (born in Ireland)
- Colm Begley (born in Ireland)
- Bill Bourke (Irish parents)
- Dermott Brereton (Irish parents)
- Callum Brown (grew up in Ireland)
- Ciarán Byrne (born in Ireland)
- Martin Clarke (born in Ireland)
- Bernie Collins (born in Ireland)
- Ray Connellan (born in Ireland)
- Alan Coomey (born in Ireland)
- Paul Earley (born in Ireland)
- Mike Finn (born in Ireland)
- Daniel Flynn (born in Ireland)
- Stuart Hamilton (born in Ireland)
- Conor Glass (born in Ireland)
- Cian Hanley (Irish father)
- Pearce Hanley (Irish father)
- Nathan Jones (Irish parents)
- Zak Jones (Irish parents)
- Darragh Joyce (born in Ireland)
- Mark Keane (born in Ireland)
- Tadhg Kennelly (born in Ireland)
- Ciarán Kilkenny (born in Ireland)
- Denis Lanigan (born in Ireland)
- Stuart Magee (born in Ireland)
- James Madden (born in Ireland)
- James Magner (Irish parents)
- Jock McHale (Irish parents)
- Chrissy McKaigue (born in Ireland)
- Niall McKeever (born in Ireland)
- Conor McKenna (born in Ireland)
- Dermot McNicholl (born in Ireland)
- Ross McQuillan (born in Ireland)
- Caolan Mooney (born in Ireland)
- Oisín Mullin (born in Ireland)
- Red Óg Murphy (born in Ireland)
- Conor Nash (raised in Ireland)
- Reilly O'Brien
- Liam O'Connell (born in Ireland)
- Mark O'Connor (born in Ireland)
- Brett O'Hanlon
- Jamie O'Reilly (born in Ireland)
- Colin O'Riordan (born in Ireland)
- Aisake Ó hAilpín (born in Ireland)
- Setanta Ó hAilpín (Irish father)
- Michael Quinn (born in Ireland)
- Clifford Richardson (born in Ireland)
- Fred Scott (born in Ireland)
- Ciarán Sheehan (born in Ireland)
- Thomas H. Smith (born in Ireland)
- Liam Shiels (Irish parents)
- Brian Stynes (born in Ireland)
- David Stynes (born in Ireland)
- Jim Stynes (born in Ireland)
- Anton Tohill (born in Ireland)
- Zach Tuohy (born in Ireland)
- Tommy Walsh (born in Ireland)
- Sean Wight (Irish parents)

=== Italy ===
- Steven Alessio (father and mother Italian-born)
- Ron Auchettl
- Edo Benetti (Italian parents)
- John Benetti (Italian father)
- Peter Bevilaqua (born in Italy)
- Marcus Bontempelli
- Bert Boromeo (Italian father)
- Mario Bortolotto (Italian parents)
- Scott Camporeale
- Vin Catoggio (Italian parents)
- Reece Conca (Italian father)
- Stephen Coniglio (Italian father)
- Adam Contessa (Italian father)
- Frank Curcio
- Steven Da Rui (Italian parents)
- Ron De Iulio (Italian parents)
- Danny Del-Re (Italian parents)
- Brett Deledio
- Frank Dimattina (Italian parents)
- Robert DiPierdomenico
- Alec Epis
- Alex Fasolo
- Brendan Fevola (Italian father)
- Michael Firrito
- Silvio Foschini (Italian parents)
- Dominic Fotia
- Cyril Gambetta
- Hugo Garcia
- Sam Grlj
- Adam Iacobucci
- Len Incigneri
- Anthony Koutoufides
- Tony Liberatore (parents born in Italy)
- Paul Licuria (Italian father)
- Frank Marchesani
- Al Martello
- Ray Martini
- Peter Matera
- Phillip Matera
- Wally Matera
- Mark Mercuri
- Joe Misiti
- Anthony Morabito (Italian mother)
- Romano Negri
- Christian Petracca
- Peter Pianto
- Paul Puopolo (Italian parents)
- Simon Prestigiacomo (Italian father)
- Adam Ramanauskas
- Peter Riccardi
- Frank Rigaldi
- Matt Riggio
- Guy Rigoni
- Anthony Rocca (father born in Italy)
- Saverio Rocca (father born in Italy)
- Renato Serafini
- Alex Silvagni (Italian father)
- Sergio Silvagni (father and mother Italian-born)
- Stephen Silvagni (mother Italian-born)
- Ian Stewart
- Shane Valenti
- Bill Valli (Italian parents)
- Dante Visentini
- Vigo Visentini
- Herc Vollugi

=== Latvia ===
- Peter Agrums
- Arnold Briedis
- Andrejs Everitt (Latvian mother)
- Peter Everitt (Latvian mother)
- Rene Kink

=== Lithuania ===
- Algy Vosilaitis (born in Lithuania)
- Adam Ramanauskas
- Jack Lukosius

=== Malta ===
- Jayden Attard
- Tony Buhagiar
- Jaryd Cachia
- David Calthorpe
- John Formosa
- Blake Grima
- Nathan Grima
- Adam Saliba

=== Netherlands ===
- Peter Castrikum (born in Dutch East Indies)
- Matt De Boer
- Terry De Koning (Dutch father)
- Robbert Klomp
- Josh Gibcus
- David Hale (Dutch mother)
- Matthew Kreuzer
- Daniel Pearce (Dutch mother)
- Ben Rutten (Dutch father)
- Ryan Schoenmakers
- Billie Smedts (Dutch father)
- Andrew Swallow (Dutch mother)
- David Swallow (Dutch mother)
- Richard Vandenberg
- Paul van der Haar
- Nick Vlastuin

=== North Macedonia and Macedonia ===
- Peter Daicos (parents born in Greek Macedonia)
- John Gastev
- Sam Grlj
- Mark Nicoski (father born in North Macedonia)
- Nick Malceski (Macedonian father)
- Alex Marcou (parents born in Greek Macedonia)
- Paul Peos (parents born in Greek Macedonia)

=== Norway ===
- Wally Koochew (Norwegian mother)

=== Poland ===
- Jason Blake (Polish mother)
- Jacob Koschitzke
- Justin Koschitzke
- Steven Kretiuk
- John Pitura
- James Podsiadly
- Jared Polec
- David Sierakowski
- Will Sierakowski

=== Russia ===
- Bohdan Jaworskyj
- Alex Jesaulenko (Russian mother)

=== Serbia ===
- Brian Kekovich
- Sam Kekovich
- Lazar Vidovic
- Lukas Markovic

=== Slovenia ===
- Sam Grlj
- Rene Kink
- Nick Suban
- Dayne Zorko (father born in Yugoslavia, now Slovenia)

=== Spain ===
- Hugo Garcia
- Paul Licuria

=== Sweden ===
- Kris Massie (born in Sweden)
- Karl Worner (Swedish mother)

=== Switzerland ===
- Henri Jeanneret
- Matthew Leuenberger (Swiss father)

=== Turkey ===
- Taylin Duman (Turkish-born father)
- Sedat Sir
- Errol Gulden (Turkish-born father)

=== United Kingdom ===
- Roy Cazaly (Scottish mother, English father)
- Martin Clarke
- Pearce Hanley (born in England; Welsh mother, Irish father)
- Jamie O'Reilly
- Brodie Smith (English mother, Scottish father)
- Aaron Young (English mother, Scottish father)

==== England ====
- Angus Anderson
- Callum Brown (born in England)
- Percy Bowyer (born in England)
- Chris Burton (born in England)
- Stephen Coniglio (English mother)
- Sam Draper
- Bill Eason (born in England)
- Mitch Golby (English father)
- Ryan Harwood (English mother)
- Oliver Hayes-Brown (born in England)
- Garrick Ibbotson (English mother)
- Connor Idun (born in England)
- Brandon Jack (born in England)
- Daniel Kerr
- Ryan Lester (English-born mother)
- Leo Lombard (English mother)
- Brad Moran (born in England)
- Cameron Mackenzie (born in England)
- Chris Mayne (English father)
- Paul Medhurst (English father)
- Brian Mynott (born in England)
- Bill Perkins (born in England)
- John Scarlett
- Matthew Scarlett (English father)
- Billie Smedts (English mother)
- David Swallow (English father)
- Clive Waterhouse (born in England)
- Jack Watts (parents born in England)
- Josh Worrell (born in England)
- John Worsfold

==== Jersey ====
- Mark Blicavs (mother born in Jersey)

==== Northern Ireland ====
- Aidan Corr (born in Northern Ireland)
- Conor Glass (born in Northern Ireland)
- Stuart Magee (born in Northern Ireland)

==== Scotland ====
- James Aitken (Scottish father)
- Ramsay Anderson (born in Scotland)
- Alex Barlow (born in Scotland)
- John Bell (Scottish parents)
- Bob Cameron (Scottish parents)
- Colin Campbell (Scottish father)
- Roy Cazaly (Scottish mother)
- Brian Cook (born in Scotland)
- Matthew Dick (born in Scotland)
- Sam Docherty (Scottish father)
- Norman Doig (Scottish parents)
- Andy Dougall (Scottish parents)
- Bob Edmond (born in Scotland)
- Jim Edmond (born in Scotland)
- Alexander John Fraser (Scottish parents)
- Doug Fraser (Scottish parents)
- Stewart Geddes (Scottish parents)
- James Duncan Gordon (Scottish father)
- Alex Lang (Scottish father)
- Grant Lawrie (Scottish parents)
- Thomas Leather (born in Scotland)
- Les MacPherson (Scottish father)
- William Marshall (born in Scotland)
- Firth McCallum (Scottish father)
- Luke McGuane
- Stanley McKenzie (Scottish mother)
- Ted McLean (Scottish father)
- Henry McPetrie (born in Scotland)
- Bill Morris (Scottish father)
- Charlie Norris (Scottish father)
- Alick Ogilvie (Scottish father)
- Rhys Palmer (Scottish father)
- Hugh Plowman (Scottish father)
- Bill Proudfoot (Scottish parents)
- Stan Reid (Scottish father)
- Bruce Sloss (Scottish father)
- Paul Stewart (Scottish father)
- George Sutherland (born in Scotland)
- Ewan Thompson (born in Scotland)
- Sean Wight (born in Scotland)

==== Wales ====
- James Gwilt (Welsh father)
- Cian Hanley (Welsh mother)
- Pearce Hanley (Welsh mother)
- John McCarthy

=== Ukraine ===
- Jason Daniltchenko
- Alex Ishchenko
- Bohdan Jaworskyj
- Alex Jesaulenko (Ukrainian father)
- Jake Kolodjashnij (Ukrainian-Russian father)
- Kade Kolodjashnij (Ukrainian-Russian father)
- Steven Kolyniuk
- Jared Petrenko
- Jason Porplyzia
- Justin Staritski
- Shane Woewodin (Ukrainian parents)

== Oceania ==
=== Cook Islands ===
- Karmichael Hunt

=== Fiji ===
- Alipate Carlile (Fijian mother)
- Josaia Delana
- Aaron Hall (Fijian mother)
- Setanta Ó hAilpín
- Aisake Ó hAilpín
- Nic Naitanui
- Tom Nicholls (Fijian mother)
- David Rodan (Fijian-born mother)
- Esava Ratugolea (Fijian parents)
- Atu Bosenavulagi (born in Fiji)

=== New Zealand ===
- Oskar Baker
- Connor Ballenden (born in New Zealand to New Zealander father)
- Simon Black
- Paul Bower (Maori mother)
- Greg Broughton (Maori father)
- Louis Butler
- Adam Campbell
- Trent Croad
- Danny Dickfos (Maori)
- Donald Dickie (Maori)
- Aaron Edwards (New Zealand father)
- Max Gawn (New Zealand-born parents)
- Heath Grundy
- Kurt Heatherley
- Karmichael Hunt
- Jarrad Jansen (born in New Zealand; parents born in New Zealand)
- Mykelti Lefau (born in New Zealand)
- Dustin Martin (Maori father)
- Beau Maister
- Rowan Marshall (born in New Zealand)
- Daniel McAlister (Maori)
- Sam Mitchell
- Thomas O'Halloran (born in New Zealand)
- Brett Peake (Maori)
- Brian Peake (Maori)
- Daniel Pearce (New Zealand father)
- Jasper Pittard
- Jordan Russell
- Ben Rutten (New Zealand mother)
- Shane Savage (born in New Zealand; Maori father)
- Wayne Schwass (Maori)
- Joe Sellwood
- Nathan van Berlo
- Jay van Berlo
- Brent Renouf
- Rupert Wills (born in New Zealand)
- Marley Williams (Maori father)

=== Papua New Guinea ===
- Aiden Bonar (Papua New Guinean mother)
- Cameron Ellis-Yolmen
- James Gwilt (Papua New Guinean mother)
- Peter Ladhams (born in Papua New Guinea)
- Mal Michael
- Patrick Murtagh
- Hewago Oea (born in Papua New Guinea)
- Bruce Reville (born in Papua New Guinea)
- Ben Sexton
- Michael Sexton
- Nick Vlastuin
- Ollie Wines

=== Samoa ===
- Aaron Edwards
- Karmichael Hunt
- Mykelti Lefau (Samoan father)

=== Tonga ===
- Paul Curtis (Tongan mother)
- Israel Folau (Tongan parents)
- David Rodan (Fijian-Tongan mother, Tongan father)

=== Tuvalu ===
- Scott Harding

== See also ==
- List of AFL Women's players with international backgrounds
- List of Australian Football League players born outside Australia
