= Australian rules football in Scotland =

- Country: Scotland
- Governing body: AFL Scotland
- National team: Scotland
- Nickname: SARFL
- Clubs: 5

In Scotland, the sport of Australian rules football (known locally as "Aussie Rules") is a minor, relatively unknown sport, currently played at amateur level by men and women teams from five clubs spread across the regions of Glasgow, Edinburgh, Fife and West Lothian. The Haggis Cup, a major invitational tournament hosted in Scotland, has been run annually since 2004. Unlike the sport in England, in Scotland, the main format is nine-a-side footy played on rugby union fields.

The sport has a long history in Scotland but with extended periods of inactivity. Scottish involvement had a big influence on the sport's development in its earliest days, coordinating the first competitions and trophies. Melbourne's Scottish school, Scotch College was involved in the first recorded game now the longest running football competition in the world, the Cordner–Eggleston Cup first contested in 1858. The Scots also ran the Caledonian Challenge Cup in 1861, established Australian rules football in Queensland in 1866 and one of the game's earliest and most successful clubs, the Essendon Football Club in 1872. The game was first established in Edinburgh in 1888 by students from Edinburgh University though .

Edinburgh has hosted the EU Cup, including the 2012 tournament and most recently in 2022. The national men's team best result is 5th in 2009, the women's team's has achieved 3rd in both 2014 and 2022. In all other international tournaments including the AFL Europe Championship and Australian Football International Cup, Scotland competes as part of the combined Great Britain men's or women's side.

Scottish players have featured in the Australian Football League as early as 1897, its first year of competition.

== History ==
=== Scottish involvement in early years of Australian rules in Australia ===
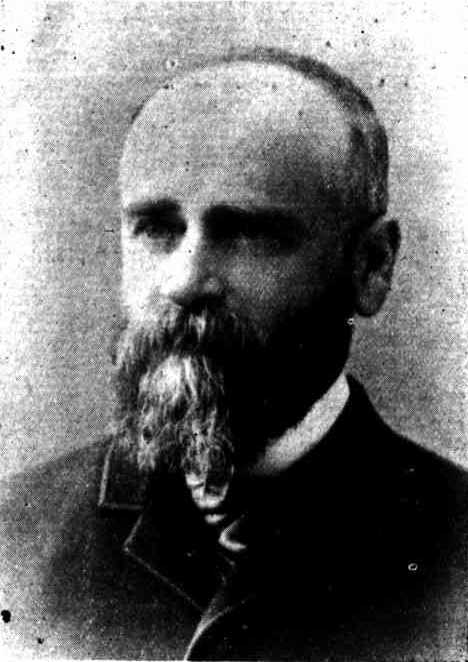
David Watterston (pictured in 1898) instigated Australian rules football in Queensland in 1866

==== 1850s ====
Scots were playing forms of football during the Victorian gold rush in the 1850s contributing to the early mix of rules played that eventually morphed into Australian rules. Scots living in Melbourne and Victoria in the mid-19th century were greatly involved in the formation of the rules of the game, as well as the formation of a number of early clubs.

==== 1860s ====
Scotch College's John Macadam, from Glasgow, umpired (along with Tom Wills) the first recorded match on 7 August 1858 between Scotch College and Melbourne Grammar under expiremental new rules.

The first competition and trophy in 1861 was the instigation of the Royal Caledonian Society and known as the Caledonian Challenge Cup. Among the members was George Frederick Bowen who born in Sydney to Scottish immigrants who founded the Carlton Football Club.

David Watterston of Balgone Barns, Haddingtonshire learned the game upon migrating to Melbourne, but importantly was founder of the Brisbane Football Club which commenced Australian rules football in Queensland in 1866 the second British colony to take up the sport.

John McCrae, of Edinburgh and Scots College in Melbourne, established one of the first school clubs outside of Victoria in 1868 at Ipswich Grammar School.

==== 1870s ====
One club formed by Scots was the Essendon Football Club (participating in the elite Australian Football League) formed in 1872 which was founded by Robert McCracken, born in Ayrshire who emigrated at the age of 28. The now-defunct Glasgow Redbacks wore black jumpers with a red diagonal stripe across the front, the same as worn by Essendon Football Club said to recognise the Scottish roots of Essendon.

=== First introduction in Edinburgh: 1880s ===
As early as April 1888 students at Edinburgh University (mostly Australian) had formed a team. The team contested a match in England against London University on 14 April 1888. Reports in July 1889 from Australia appear to indicate that the sport continued for a time in Edinburgh, but that the Edinburgh team "wiped out every competing team". Records of any team beyond this appear not to have survived.

=== Rumoured River Clyde competition: 1900s ===
There are rumours of a competition near the River Clyde during the early 20th Century, referred to in Geoffrey Blainey's A Game of Our Own, where a number of expatriate Australians were based in Scotland either as Ship Workers or Soldiers. Had this league existed, and there is no proof it ever did, then it had died out around the time of the First World War.

=== Earliest clubs and Establishment of the SARFL: 1990s-Present ===
During the 1990s the Caledonian Sharks were set up by John Boland, with the travelling restraints at the time club games lessened over the years until a period of inactivity until being adopted and rebranded as the Glasgow Sharks by Andrew Butler in 2003. The Edinburgh Puffins and modern SARFL came about through the work of Andrew Butler and Richard Prentice, former players with BARFL side, North London Lions. Butler and Prentice began plans for the SARFL in the winter of 2003. Intra city friendlies began in early 2003 and a combined rules match against Edinburgh Gaelic side Dunedin Connolleys. The Puffins made their debut in the 2003 Northern Cup tournament staged in St Helens. The side remained unbeaten against the then St Helens Miners and Wandsworth Demons. Later in 2003, the Puffins staged a home and away series against Oxford University winning both hard-fought games. The inaugural SARFL season was held in 2004 with a league consisting of two sides in Edinburgh and one in Glasgow. The Puffins name, originally conceived by inaugural Edinburgh Puffins coach Gavin England was subsequently conferred upon the Scottish national team. Later in 2010 the Scottish Puffins were rebranded as the Scottish Clansmen.

In 2006, Glasgow and Edinburgh considered competing in the BARFL Regional competition, though travel problems saw them continue an expanded SARFL local competition with the Glasgow Redbacks and Middlesbrough Hawks from northern England joining the league. The Hawks left the league in 2007 to join the northern division of Aussie Rules UK, and the Scottish league had difficulty in operating on more than a social match level in 2008.

The league was relaunched in 2009, with the Glasgow and Edinburgh playing bases consolidated to one club in each city. They were joined by a new club in Aberdeen, named the "Aberdingoes".

== Clubs & Competitions ==
=== Local Leagues ===
Competition	Region	First season	Scottish Teams	Notes
Scottish Australian Rules Football League (SARFL)	Glasgow, Edinburgh, Kirkaldy & Broxburn	2004	5	Scottish AFL
Haggis Cup	Invitational	2004		

=== Current clubs ===
Location map of current clubs in the league.

The following teams are active in Scotland:

Club	Colours	Nickname	Home ground	Former league	Founded	Years active
Edinburgh		Bloods	Inverleith Park, Edinburgh	–	2003	2003-
Greater Glasgow		Giants	Glasgow Green, Glasgow	–	2015	2015-
Glasgow		Sharks	GHA Rugby Club, Giffnock, Glasgow	–	2003	2003-
Kingdom		Kangaroos	Beveridge Park, Kirkcaldy	–	2013	2013-
Tyne Tees		Tigers	Broadway West Playing Fields, Gosforth, Newcastle Upon Tyne	AFLCNE	2013	2018-

=== Former clubs ===
Club	Colours	Nickname	Home ground	Founded	Years active	Fate
Aberdeen		Eagles		2009	2009–2013	Folded after 2013 season
Falkirk		Silverbacks		2015	2015–2016	Folded after 2016 season
West Lothian		Eagles	Winchburgh Sports Hub, Broxburn	2016	2016-2023	Folded after 2023 season

== Haggis Cup results ==
The Haggis Cup is a major regional tournament hosted in Scotland involving teams from Scotland with invitational teams from the United Kingdom, Ireland and Europe that has been run annually since 2004.

Year	Date	Men's winners	Women's winners	Host venue
2004		Glasgow Sharks		
2005		Glasgow Sharks		
2006		Dublin Demons		
2007	5 May	Edinburgh Bloods		Glasgow
2008	12 April	Edinburgh Bloods		Glasgow
2009	23 May	Aberdingoes		Glasgow
2010	10 April	Dublin Demons		Cartha Queens Park RFC, Glasgow
2011	9 April	Glasgow Sharks		Scotstoun Stadium, Glasgow
2012	21 April	Edinburgh Bloods	Dublin Angels	Peffermill fields, University of Edinburgh, Edinburgh
2013		Edinburgh Bloods		
2014	12 April	Glasgow Sharks	Tyne Tees Tigers	GHA Rugby Club, Giffnock, Glasgow
2015	11 April	Huddersfield Rams		Peffermill fields, University of Edinburgh, Edinburgh
2016		Wimbledon Hawks	Saltires	Peffermill fields, University of Edinburgh, Edinburgh
2017		Nottingham Scorpions	University of Birmingham	West of Scotland F.C., Milngavie, Glasgow
2018	14 April	Wandsworth Demons		West of Scotland F.C., Milngavie, Glasgow
2019	2 March	Manchester Mosquitoes		Edinburgh
2020	Not held due to COVID-19 pandemic			
2021	Not held due to COVID-19 pandemic			
2022	2 April	Edinburgh Bloods		Peffermill fields, University of Edinburgh, Edinburgh
2023	15 April	South Dublin Swans	Edinburgh Bloods	Lenzie Rugby Club, Glasgow

== National team ==
Scotland
- Nickname(s): Clansmen
- Governing body: AFL Europe

Rankings
- Current: Not ranked (as of October 2022)

International Cup
- Appearances: 0

The Scottish national team, The Clansmen, compete in 1–3 events per calendar year. These events are typically the Tri-Nations Championship, the AFL Europe Euro Cup and an additional challenge match or friendly tournament across the European continent.

Euro Cup Participation

Formally known as the EU Cup, for which Scotland participated the inaugural event in London 2005, again in Prague 2008 and also in Zagreb 2009. Since becoming the Euro Cup in 2010 Scotland has participated in a further 6 of the 8 AFL Europe Euro Cup competitions to date, these were; Milan 2010; Belfast 2011; Edinburgh 2012; London 2014; Lisbon 2016 and; Bordeaux 2017.

The Scottish Clansmens strongest Euro Cup performance was in Belfast 2011, winning their group with wins over Spain and Finland and finishing 6th over all in the tournament.

Scotland in Euro Cup

Edinburgh 2012

_{Pool Stage:}

- Scotland (45) d. Norway (2)
- England (49) d. Scotland (17)
- Denmark (40) d. Scotland (16)

^{Scotland progress to the Bowl Semi-Finals}

- France (36) d. Scotland (21)

Bordeaux 2017

_{Pool Stage:}

- Ireland (79) d. Scotland (8)
- Netherlands (37) d. Scotland (36)

^{Scotland progress to the Plate Quarter-Finals}

- Scotland (63) d. Russia (5)

^{Scotland progress to the Plate Semi-Finals}

- Scotland (33) d. Jerusalem (19)

^{Scotland progress to the Plate Final}

- Czech Republic (36) d. Scotland (6)

== Audience ==
=== Television ===
ESPN (UK) and British Eurosport are the current holders of the British rights to the Australian Football League (AFL). ESPN shows three live games each round of the season including the playoffs and the AFL Grand Final. Eurosport shows one game a week but the coverage is delayed.

== Players ==
=== Men's ===
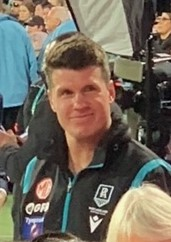
Paul Stewart with Port Adelaide in 2022

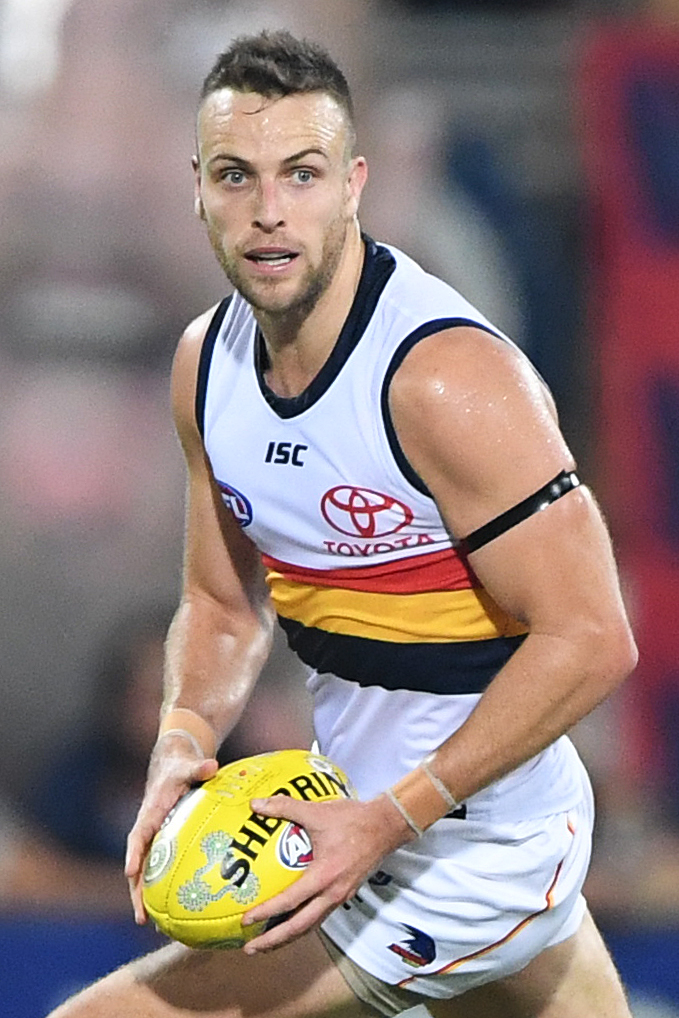
Brodie Smith playing for Adelaide in 2019

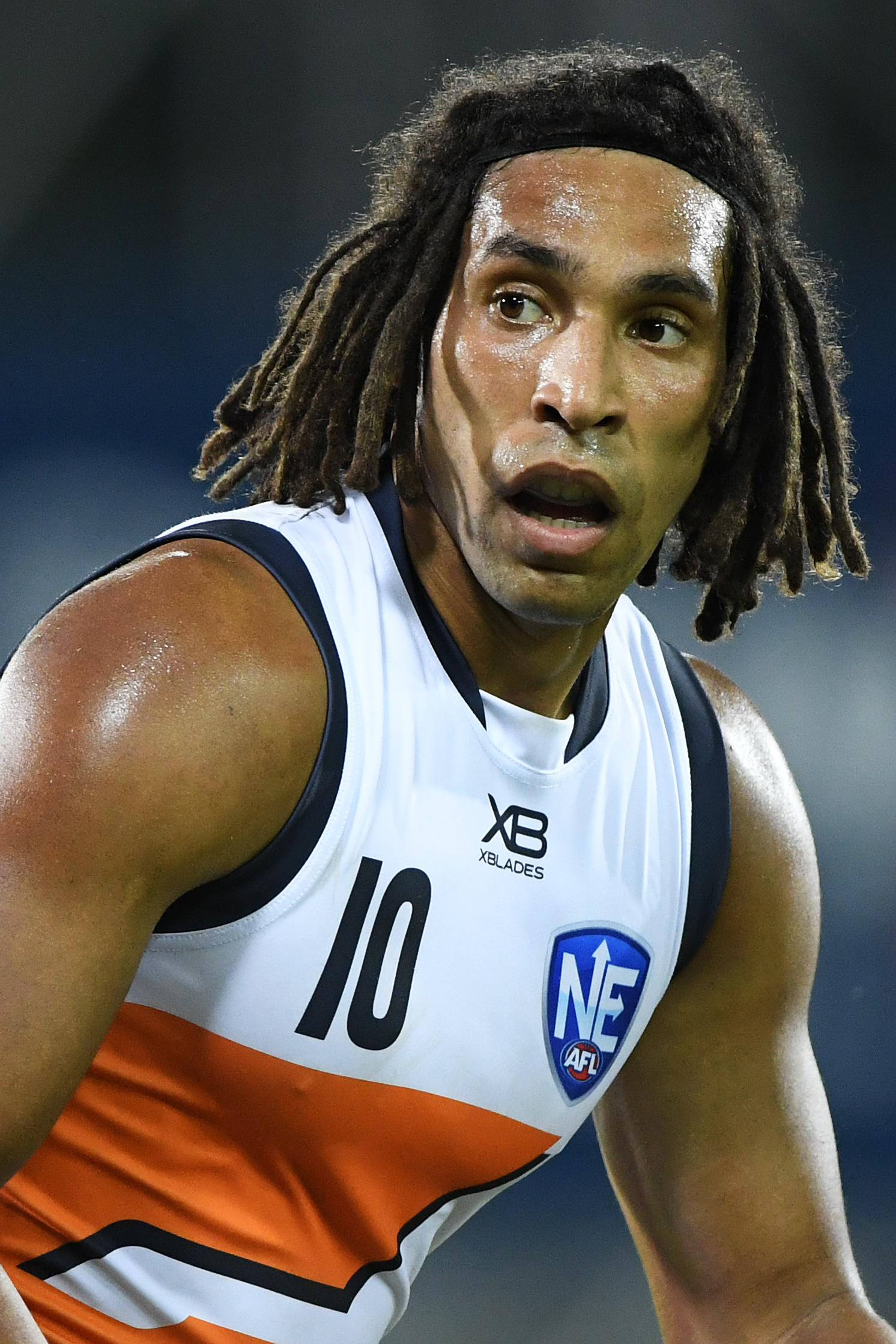
Aiden Bonar playing for Greater Western Sydney in 2019

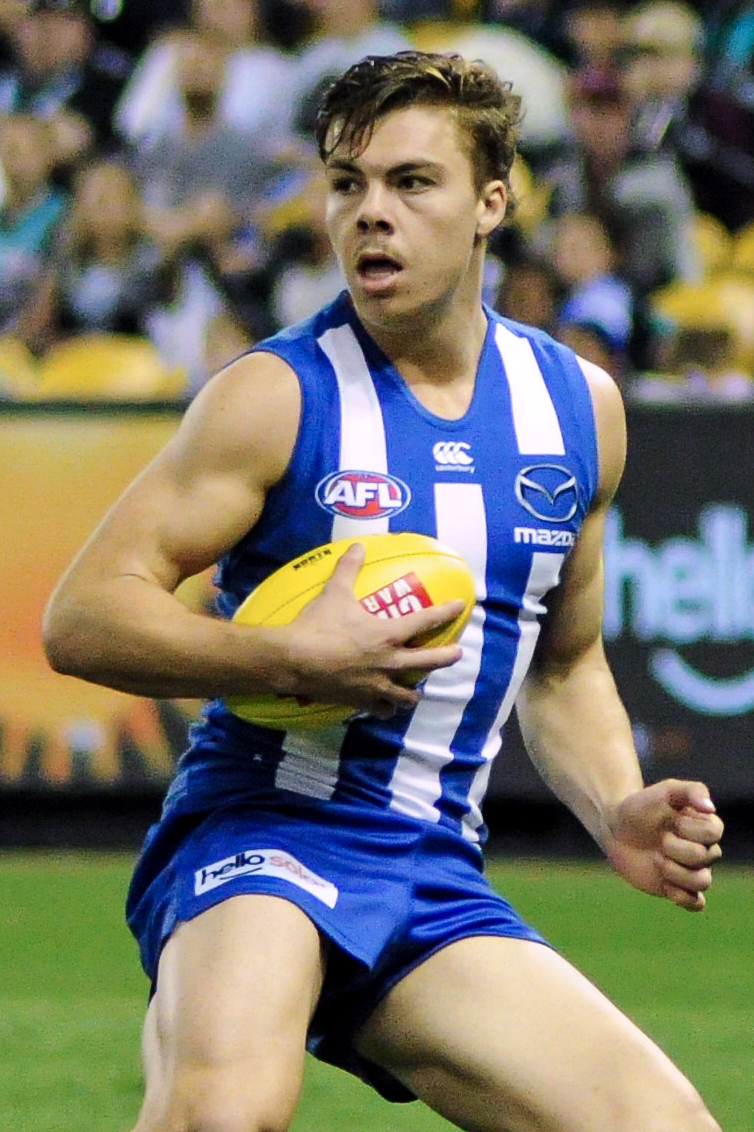
Cameron Zurhaar playing for North Melbourne in 2018

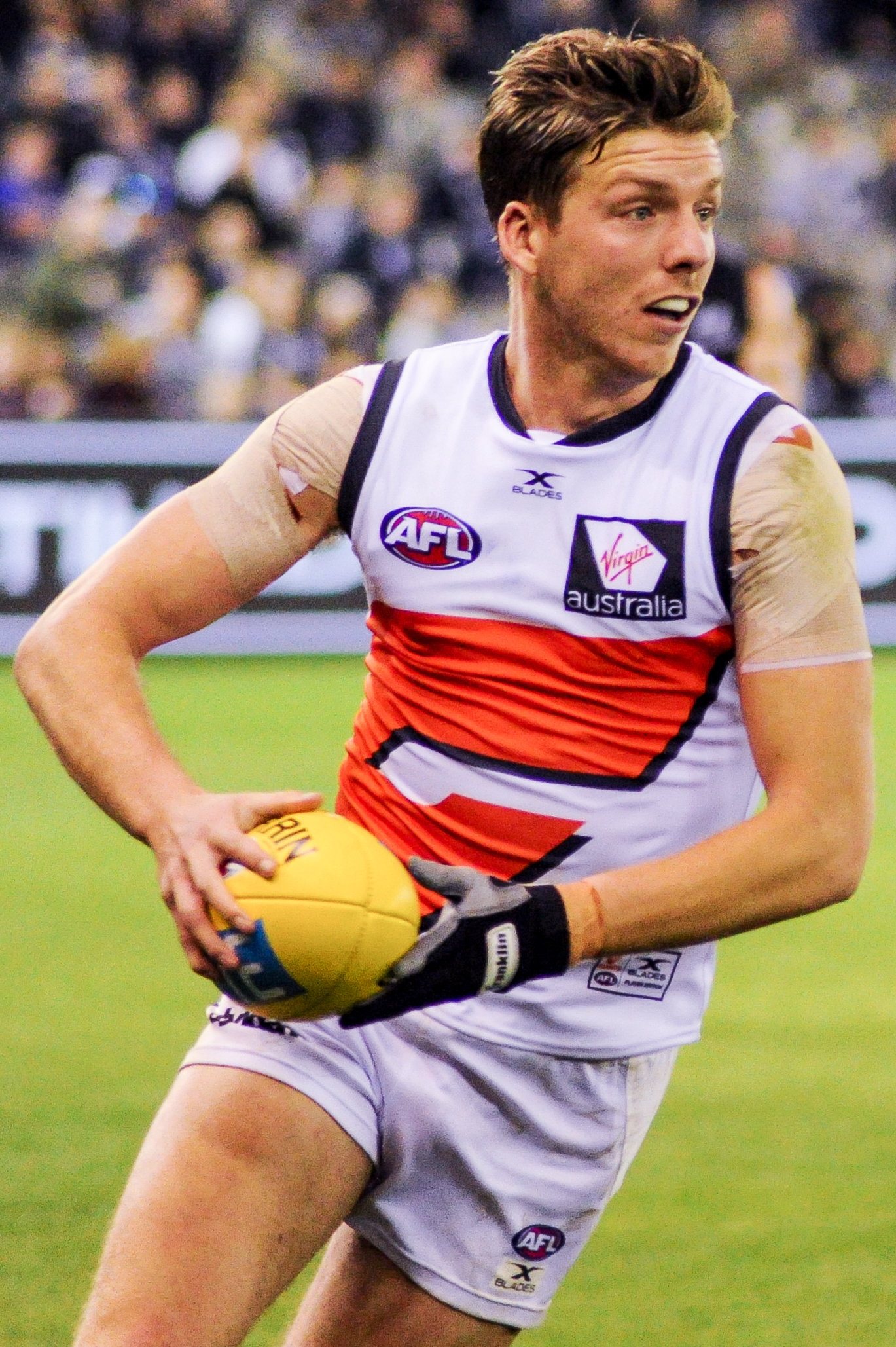
Aidan Corr playing for Greater Western Sydney in 2017

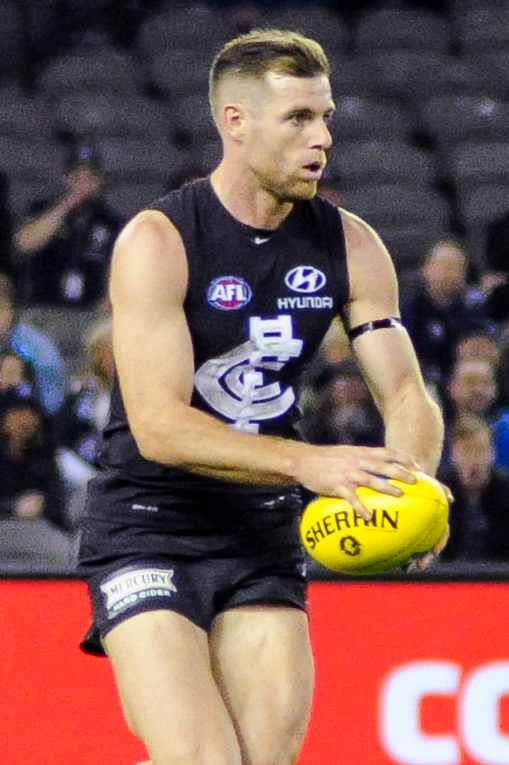
Sam Docherty playing for Carlton in 2017

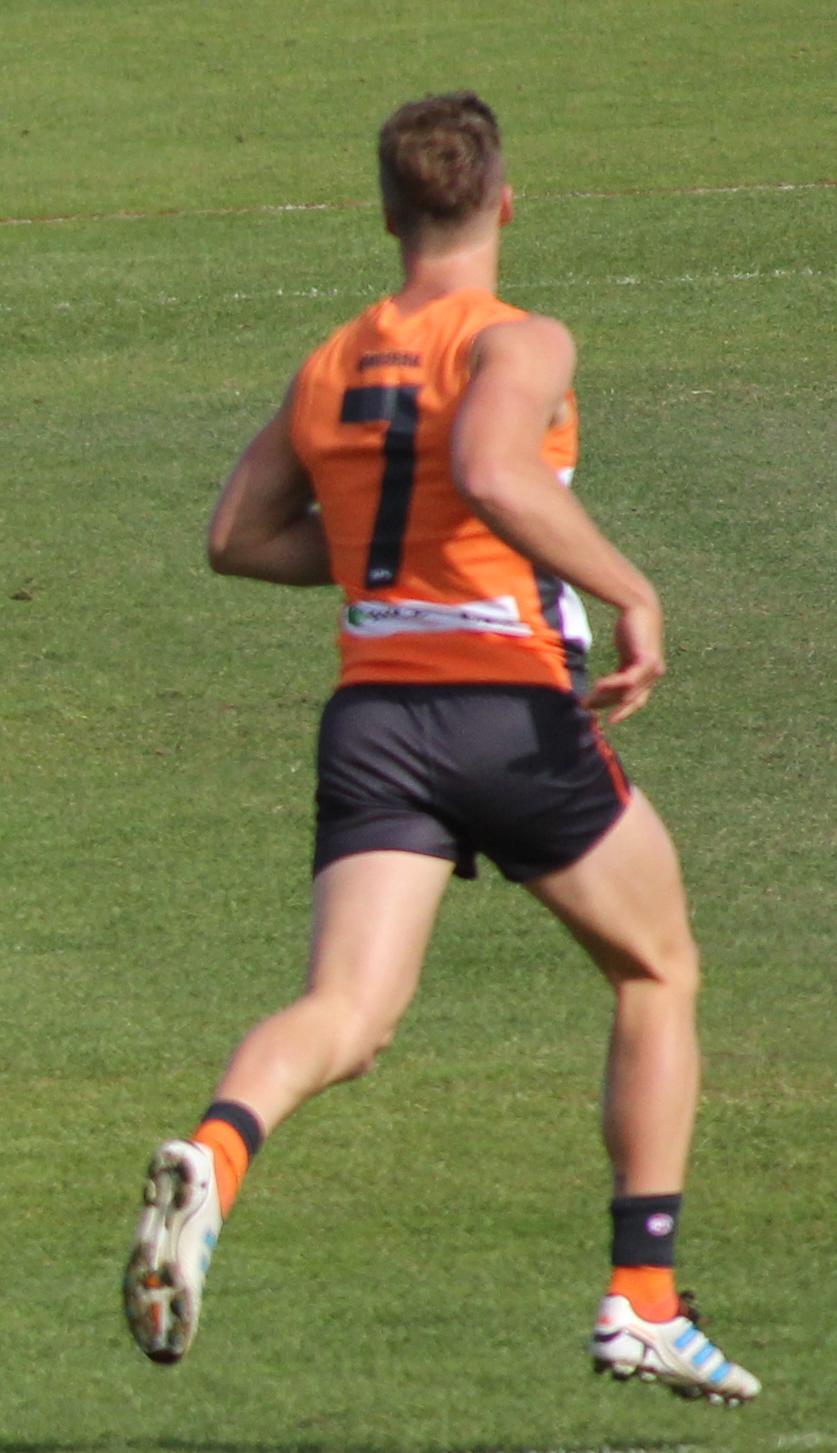
Rhys Palmer playing for Greater Western Sydney in 2012

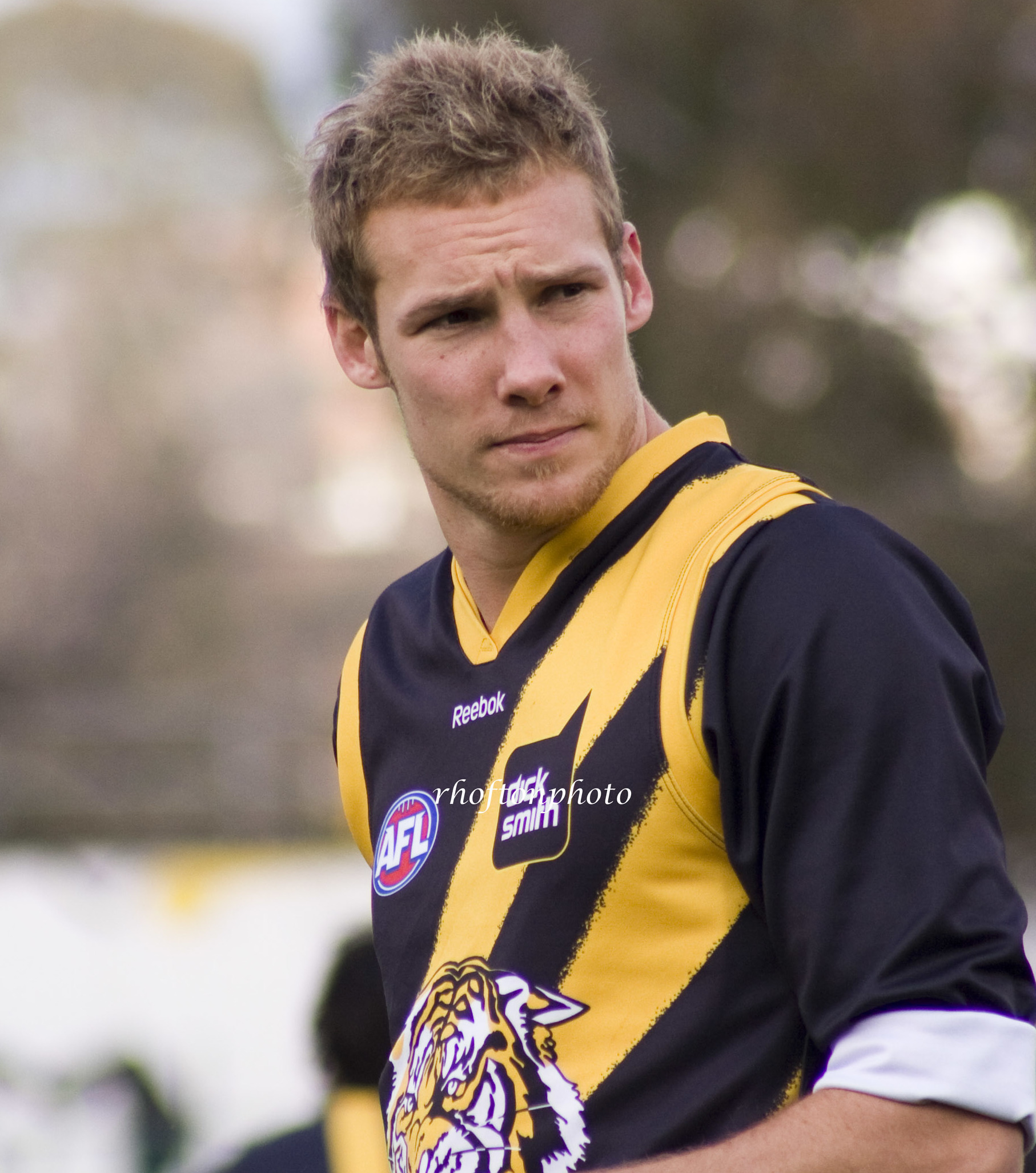
Luke McGuane playing for Richmond in 2009

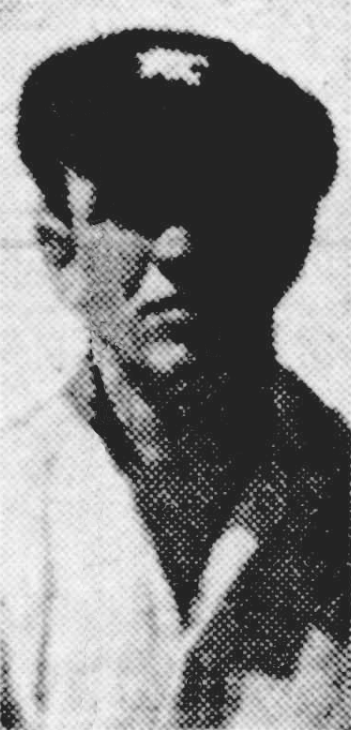
Thomas Leather playing cricket in 1936

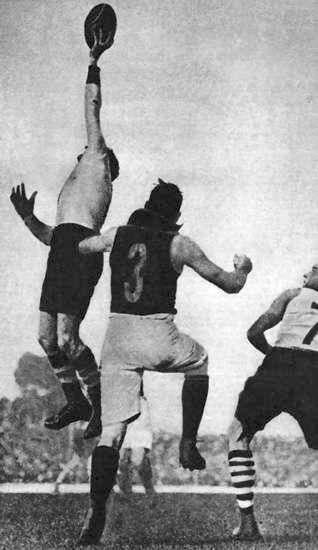
Roy Cazaly taking a one handed mark for South Melbourne in 1920

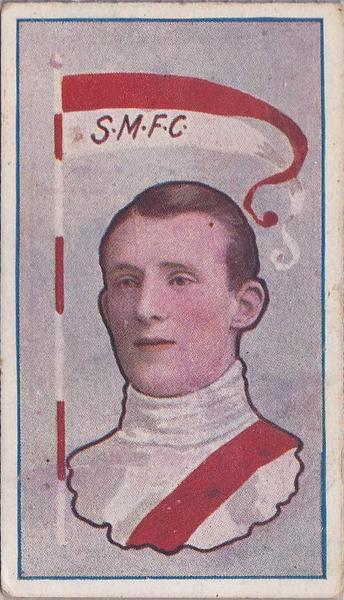
Bruce Sloss of South Melbourne in 1912

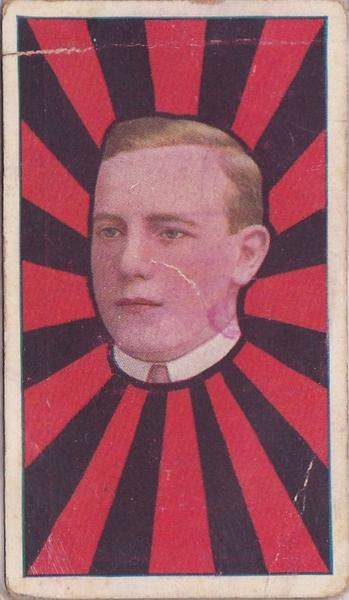
Ramsay Anderson of Essendon in 1911

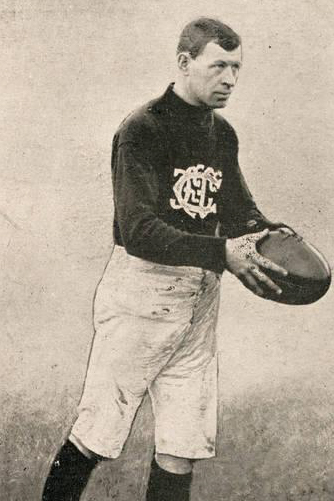
Doug Fraser in 1910

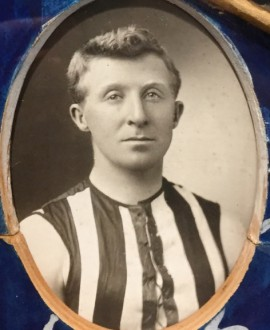
Charlie Norris of Collingwood in 1910

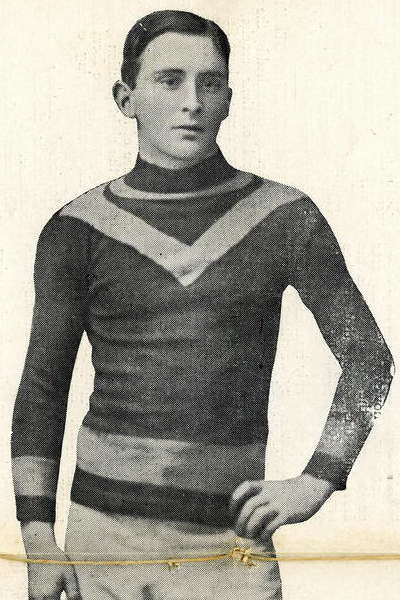
Alick Ogilvie of Melbourne in 1908

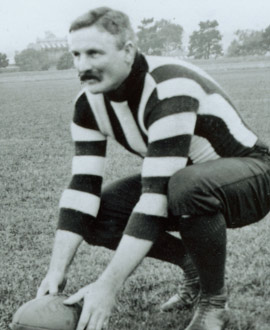
Bill Proudfoot of Collingwood in 1906

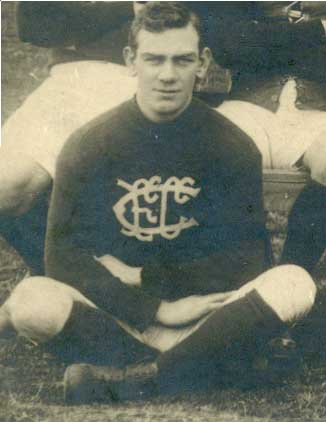
Alex Lang of Carlton in 1906

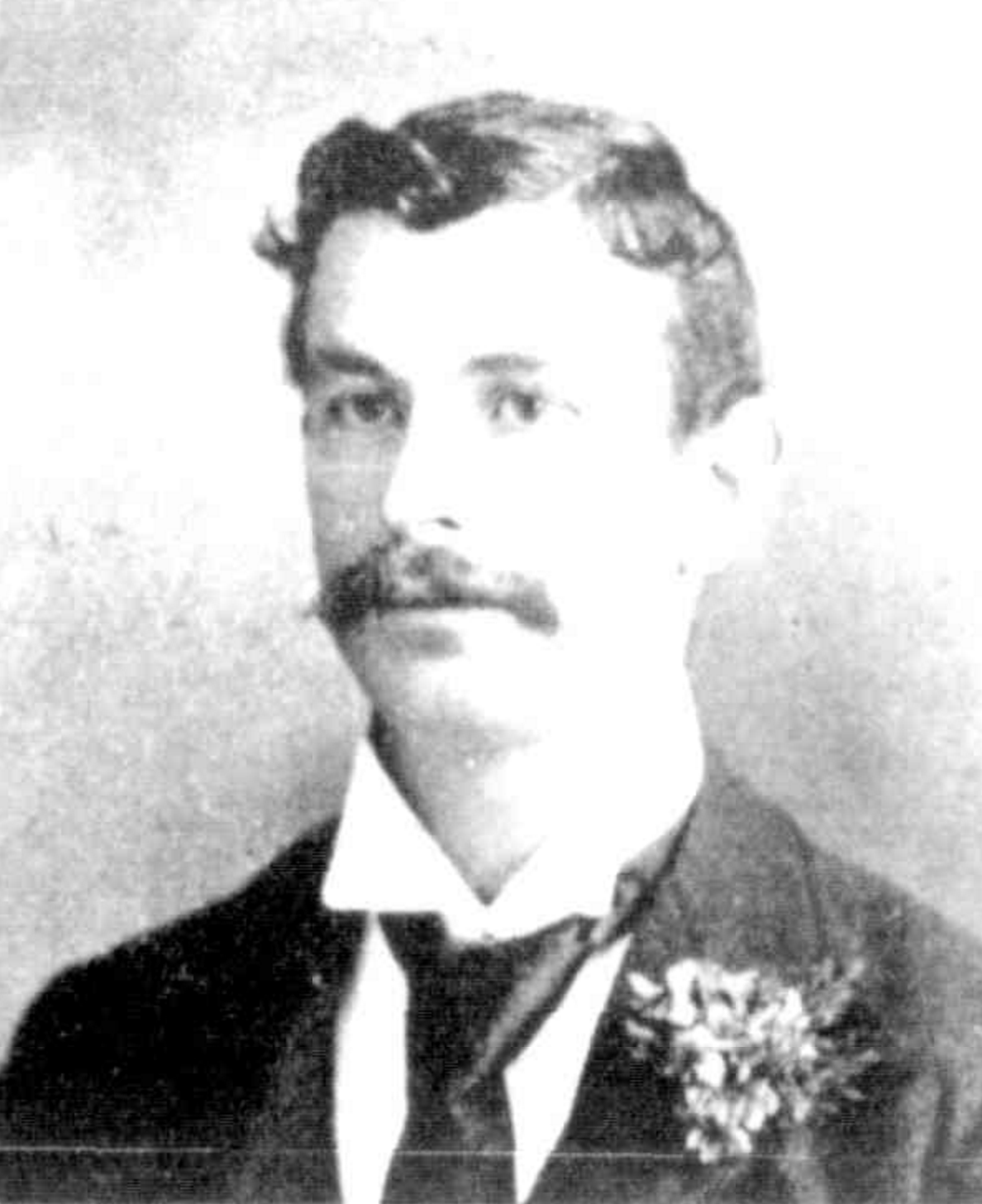
Firth McCallum of Geelong in 1899

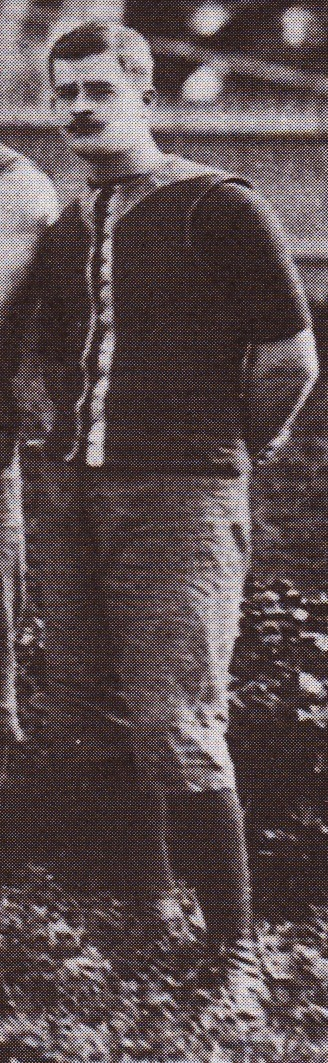
Stan Reid of Fitzroy in 1898

Currently on an AFL senior list

Player	Club/s	AFL Years*	AFL Matches*	AFL Goals*	Connections to Scotland, References
Aiden Bonar	Greater Western Sydney, North Melbourne	2020-	32	5	Father
Sam Switkowski	Fremantle	2018-	47	28	Parent
Will Walker	North Melbourne	2018-2021	6	4	Parent
Matthew Dick	Carlton	2015-2016	6	0	Parent
Cameron Zurhaar	North Melbourne	2017-	84	115	Parent
Aidan Corr	Greater Western Sydney, North Melbourne	2013-	120	2	Parent
Sam Docherty	Brisbane Lions, Carlton	2012-	135	16	Father
Brodie Smith	Adelaide	2011-	225	67	Parent
Rhys Palmer	Fremantle, Greater Western Sydney, Carlton	2008-2017	123	95	Father
Paul Stewart	Port Adelaide	2008-2016	101	33	Father
Sean Wight	Melbourne	1984-1995	150	63	Born and raised in Glasgow, father
Jim Edmond	Footscray, Sydney, Brisbane Bears	1977-1988	188	287	Born in Glasgow
Bob Edmond	Carlton	1967-1968	10	0	Born
Bill Morris	Richmond	1942-1951	140	98	Father
Thomas Leather	North Melbourne	1932-1933	16	11	Born Rutherglen
Roy Cazaly	St Kilda, South Melbourne	1911-1927	198	167	Mother
Charlie Norris	North Melbourne	1910-1918	124	23	Father
Ramsay Anderson	Essendon, University	1910-1912	31	0	Born Edinburgh
Doug Fraser	Carlton	1910	11	6	Parents
Alex Lang	Carlton	1906-17	1	0	Father
James Aitken	Geelong	1903	1	0	Father
Andy Dougall	Carlton	1902	2	0	Parents
Alex Barlow	Carlton	1901-1903	14	0	Born
Les MacPherson	Melbourne	1898-1899	5	1	Father
Henry McPetrie	Carlton	1897	5	2	Born Glasgow
Bill Proudfoot	Collingwood	1897-1906	108	0	Parents

- James Duncan Gordon (Scottish father)
- Ewan Thompson (Scottish born)
- Luke McGuane
- Firth McCallum (Scottish father)
- John Bell (Scottish parents)
- Stan Reid (Scottish father)
- Ted McLean (Scottish father)
- Colin Campbell (Scottish father)
- Alick Ogilvie (Scottish father)
- Grant Lawrie (Scottish parents)
- Alexander John Fraser (Scottish parents)
- Brian Cook (Scottish born)
- William Marshall (Scottish born)
- Bruce Sloss (Scottish father)
- Stanley McKenzie (Scottish mother)
- Hugh Plowman (Scottish father)
- George Sutherland (Scottish born)
- Norman Doig (Scottish parents)
- Bob Cameron (Scottish parents)
- Stewart Geddes (Scottish parents)
- Jordan Schroder (Scottish mother)
- Aaron Young (Scottish father)

=== Women's ===
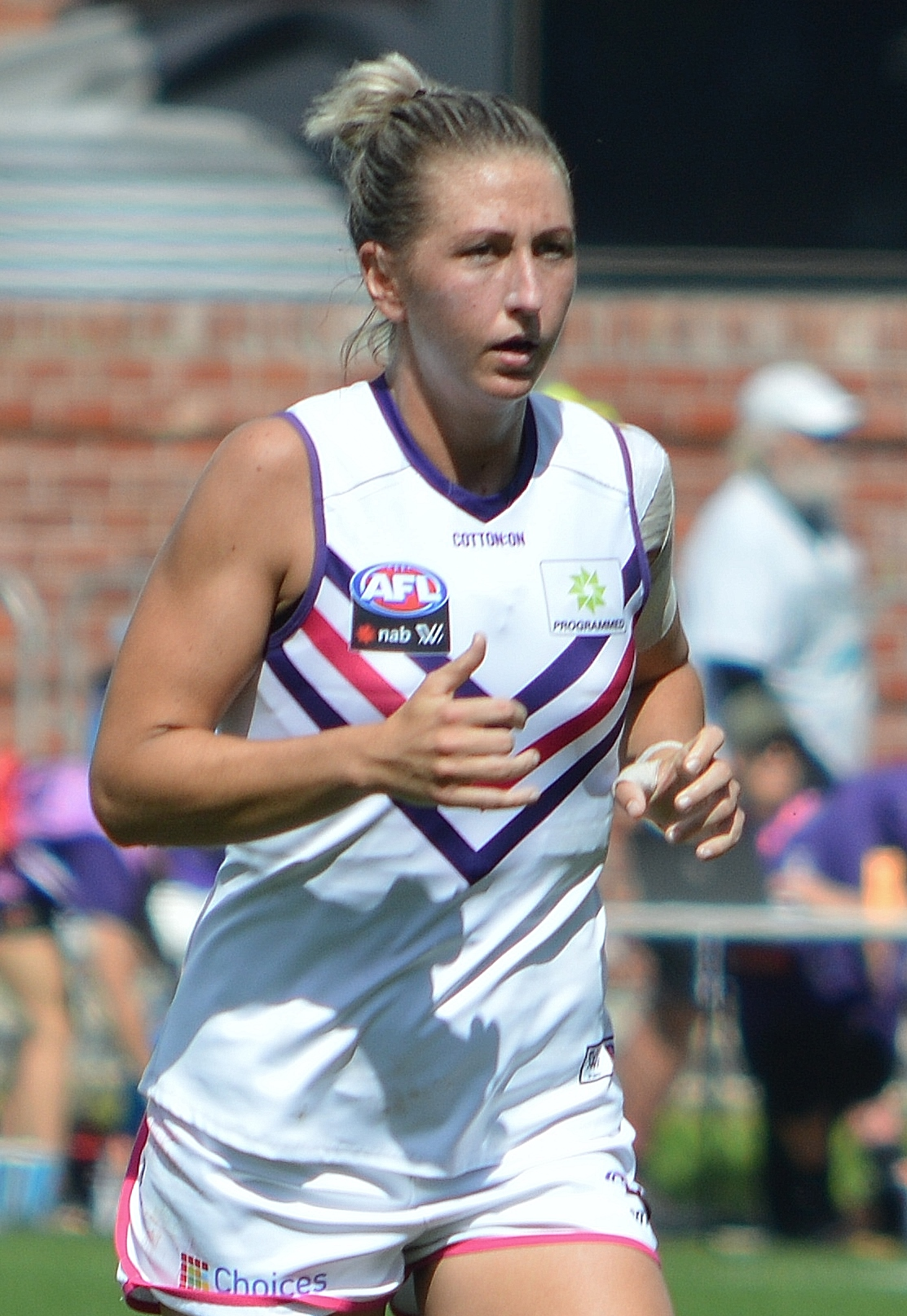
Janelle Cuthbertson playing for Fremantle in 2021

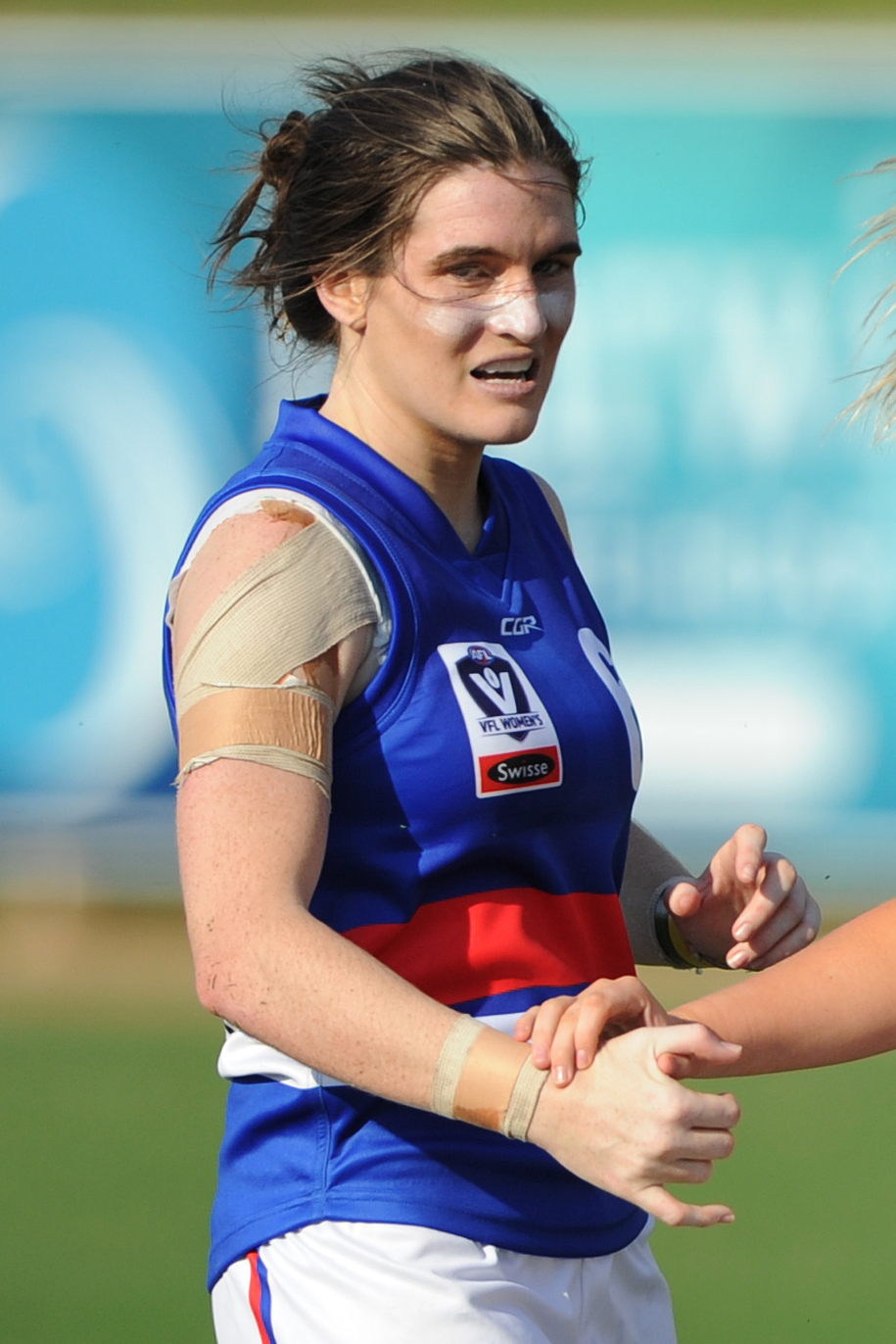
Kirsten McLeod playing for the Western Bulldogs in 2018

Currently on an AFLW senior list

Player	Club/s	AFLW Years*	AFLW Matches*	AFLW Goals*	Connections to Scotland, References
Janelle Cuthbertson	Fremantle, Port Adelaide	2020-	24	0	Parent
Kirsten McLeod	Western Bulldogs	2017-	31	21	Parent

== See also ==
- Australian rules football in the United Kingdom
- Sport in Scotland
