= Kingdom Kangaroos =

Kingdom Kangaroos ARFC

Names
- Full name: Kingdom Kangaroos; Australian Rules Football Club
- Nickname: Roos
- Motto: "Fife's only Aussie Rules Football Team"

Club details
- Founded: 2013
- Colours: Navy Blue White Grey Red
- Competition: Scottish Australian Rules Football League
- President: (Australia) Mark Flanagan
- Coach: (Scotland) Campbell Lewis
- Captain: (Scotland) Pete Etherington
- Ground: Carleton Park

Other information
- Official website: Official Website

The Kingdom Kangaroos is an Australian rules football club in Fife, Scotland. The name derives from the relationship with North Melbourne Football Club.

== Club sponsors ==
The first main club sponsor for the Roos was Kingdom FM.

Years	Seasons	Sponsor
2013–2014	1	Kingdom FM
2013-2014	1	Indentiprint
2013–2014	1	Bead Workshop Ltd
2013-2014	1	Kilted Kangaroo
2015-2016	2	Brodie's
2017-2018	2	Scotia Gas Network
2023-2025	2	Albavet

== Honours ==
- TyneTees Cup - Winners: 2013

== International players ==
Only players who played in major competitions are included.

Scottish Clansmen

- (Scotland) Iain McGarry (Tri Nation 2013)
- (Scotland) Lisle Young (Tri Nation 2013, Madrid 2014)
- (Scotland) Cameron Goodall (Tri Nation 2013, Madrid 2014)
- (Scotland) Robert Dempsey (Tri Nation 2013)
- (Scotland) Colin Lundie (Euro Champs Bordeaux 2017)
- (Scotland) Campbell Lewis (Euro Champs Bordeaux 2017, captain Euro Champs Cork 2018, Home Nations Oct 2021, Euro Champs Edinburgh 2022)
- (Scotland) Harry Black (Euro Champs Bordeaux 2017)
- (Scotland) Jack Chalmers (Home Nations Oct 2021)
- (Scotland) Thomas Keary (Home Nations Oct 2021)
- (Northern Ireland) Peter Etherington (Euro Champs Kiel 2023)

== Inaugural SARFL Team players 26 April 2014 ==
Only players who played in the first SARFL competition game against Edinburgh Bloods.

Kingdom Kangaroos

- (Scotland) Steve Downie
- (Scotland) Ross Barker
- (Scotland) Iain McGarry
- (Scotland) Gavin Scott
- (England) Daniel Balson
- (Australia) Alex Gregg
- (Scotland) Lisle Young
- (Scotland) Andrew Stenhouse
- (Scotland) Robert Dempsey
- (England) Sam Tidbury
- (Australia) James Hopgood
- (Australia) Mark Flanagan
- (England) Nik Balson
