= Callum Brown (footballer, born 2000) =

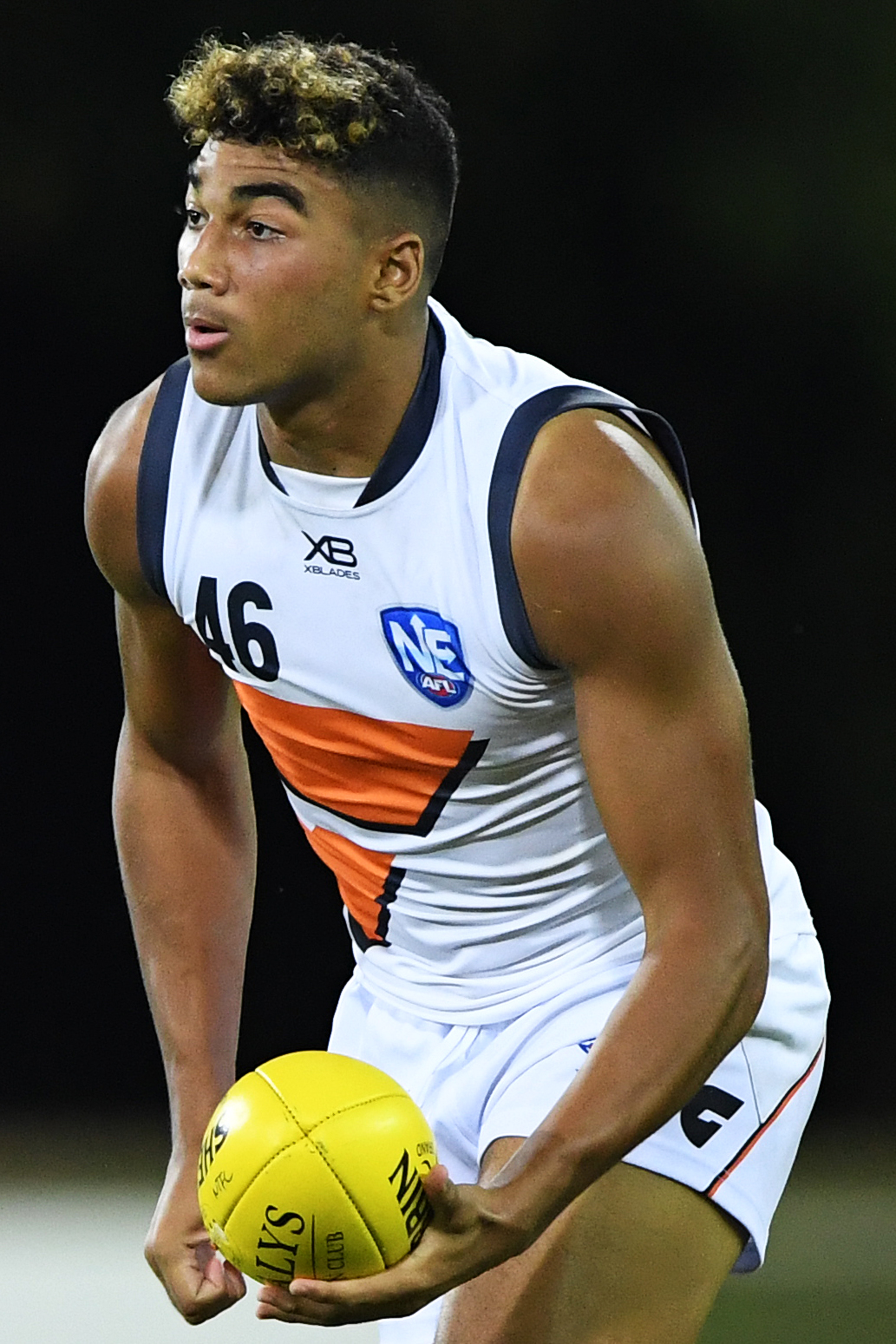
- Brown playing for the GWS reserves in 2019

Personal information
- Born: 15 August 2000 (age 26); Luton, England, United Kingdom
- Original teams: Derry GAA, Northern Ireland
- Draft: Rookie 2018 national draft
- Debut: 29 May 2021, Greater Western Sydney vs. Brisbane Lions, at Gabba
- Height: 188 cm (6 ft 2 in)
- Weight: 95 kg (209 lb)
- Position: Forward

Club information
- Current club: Greater Western Sydney
- Number: 46

Playing career^{1}
Years	Club	Games (Goals)
2021–	Greater Western Sydney	82 (89)
- ^{1} Playing statistics correct to the end of 2026.

Callum M. Brown (born 15 August 2000) is an Australian rules footballer who plays for the Greater Western Sydney Giants in the Australian Football League (AFL).

== Early life ==
Callum M. Brown was born in Luton, England to English mother Dee and Jamaican father Trevor. He grew up playing soccer which he excelled in. At the age of five he moved to Limavady in Northern Ireland where he played soccer and rugby union. A friend spotted him playing soccer and encouraged him to try gaelic football.

== Gaelic football ==
Brown first made the Derry GAA underage representative squad at the age of 14. He reached the All-Ireland minor final in 2017 with Derry and played for Derry's Under 20 side in 2018.

== Switch to Australian rules football ==
Brown was identified as an AFL prospect from as early as age 14, when he was coached by former Northern Ireland AFL recruit Chrissy McKaigue. In 2018 Nick Walsh, Jason McCartney and Heath Shaw travelled to Ireland to entice 18 year old Brown to move to Australia to play for the Giants in the AFL, signing him as an international rookie through the 2018 AFL draft.

Brown spent three years developing in the club's reserve side in the NEAFL and later the Victorian Football League before a series of consistent performances earned his call up to the senior side in 2021.

== AFL career ==
Brown was selected as a medical sub against the Brisbane Lions at the Brisbane Cricket Ground in round 11 on 29 May 2021, however he wasn't given any game time and was subsequently dropped. It wasn't until round 21 against the Geelong Football Club that he played a full game, kicking a respectable 2 goals from 4 kicks.

As a Category B rookie, Brown spent much of the 2022 season as a medical substitute. With limited opportunities in the way of game time, Brown began to talk about returning to Ireland. However in a Round 16 home game against Hawthorn, Brown, replacing an injured Lachlan Keeffe, kicked a career record 4 goals being named among the best afield. He was offered a one-year contract extension in August 2022.

== Statistics ==
Updated to the end of round 22, 2026.

Legend
G	Goals	K	Kicks	D	Disposals	T	Tackles
B	Behinds	H	Handballs	M	Marks

Season	Team	No.	Games	Totals							Averages (per game)							Votes
Season	Team	No.	Games	G	B	K	H	D	M	T	G	B	K	H	D	M	T	Votes
2019	Greater Western Sydney	46	0	—	—	—	—	—	—	—	—	—	—	—	—	—	—	0
2020 (Note: The 2020 season was played with 17 home-and-away matches per team (down from 22) and 16-minute quarters with time on (down from 20-minute quarters with time on) due to the impact of the COVID-19 pandemic.)	Greater Western Sydney	46	0	—	—	—	—	—	—	—	—	—	—	—	—	—	—	0
2021	Greater Western Sydney	46	2	2	0	4	2	6	2	1	1.0	0.0	2.0	1.0	3.0	1.0	0.5	0
2022	Greater Western Sydney	46	8	4	1	43	15	58	24	14	0.5	0.1	5.4	1.9	7.3	3.0	1.8	3
2023	Greater Western Sydney	46	19	19	14	118	83	201	77	32	1.0	0.7	6.2	4.4	10.6	4.1	1.7	0
2024	Greater Western Sydney	46	13	17	5	58	42	100	35	22	1.3	0.4	4.5	3.2	7.7	2.7	1.7	2
2025	Greater Western Sydney	46	22	25	7	163	89	252	80	47	1.1	0.3	7.4	4.0	11.5	3.6	2.1	2
2026	Greater Western Sydney	46	16	17	10	102	66	168	52	36	1.1	0.6	6.4	4.1	10.5	3.3	2.3	0
Career			80	84	37	488	297	785	270	152	1.1	0.5	6.1	3.7	9.8	3.4	1.9	7
