= Scottish Clansmen =

Names
- Motto: "Scotland's Aussie Rules Football Team"

Club details
- Founded: 2003 (as Scottish Puffins)
- Colours: Navy Blue White
- Competition: Scottish Australian Rules Football League
- Coach: (Australia) Steven Connor

The Scottish Clansmen are an Australian rules football club based in Scotland. Founded in 2003, the club was known as the Scottish Puffins until being re-branded in 2010.

== International friendlies ==
- 10 May 2014 (Madrid): Spain 26 – Scotland 77

== See also ==
- Australian rules football in Scotland
