= Glasgow Giants ARFC =

Football club

Glasgow Giants

Names
- Full name: Greater Glasgow Giants; Australian Rules Football Club

Club details
- Founded: 2015
- Colours: Orange Charcoal White
- Competition: SARFL
- President: (Scotland) David Van Der Zalm
- Coach: (Scotland) Andrew McManus
- Captain: (Scotland) (Australia) Jay K/Baileyy I
- Ground: Cambuslang rugby club

Other information
- Official website: www.glasgowgiants.scot

The Greater Glasgow Giants ARFC is an Australian rules football club based in Glasgow, Scotland.

== History ==
The club was formed in 2015 and consists of a men's and women's team. They are named after the GWS Giants of the AFL and wear their Guernseys whilst playing.

The men's team have competed in the Scottish Australian Rules Football League since 2015. In the first three years in the competition, they made consecutive SARFL Grand Final appearances, winning the premiership in 2017. The men's team have also placed second in the Haggis Cup Tournament (Scottish pre-season cup) in 2014, 2015, and 2017.

== Honours ==
In 2017, the Giants won the premiership when they defeated the Kingdom Kangaroos.

== Award winners ==
BEST & FAIREST

2015: Steven O'Kelly

2016: Ross Thomson

2017: Kieran McRedmond

GOLDEN BOOT

2015: Keir Wotherspoon

2016: Keir Wotherspoon

2017: Doug Mulliken

YOUNG PLAYER OF THE YEAR

2015: Douglas Smith

2016: Douglas Smith

2017: Scott Cochrane

COACHES PLAYER OF THE YEAR

2015: Mark Townsend

2016: Marc Mason

2017: James Reekie
