= Laurie Ogilvie =

Australian rules footballer

Personal information
- Full name: Laurence Henderson Ogilvie
- Born: 31 May 1877; Kincardine, Fife, Scotland
- Died: 18 January 1927 (aged 49); Malvern, Victoria
- Original team: Scotch College/Williamstown (VFA)
- Position: Defense

Playing career^{1}
Years	Club	Games (Goals)
1901	Melbourne	4 (3)
- ^{1} Playing statistics correct to the end of 1901.

Laurence Henderson Ogilvie (31 May 1877 – 18 January 1927) was a former Australian rules footballer who played with Melbourne in the Victorian Football League (VFL).
