= Otto Buck =

Australian rules footballer

Personal information
- Full name: Samuel Otto John Buck
- Born: 15 November 1876; St Arnaud, Victoria
- Position: Half Forward

Playing career^{1}
| Years | Club | Games (Goals) |
| 1897 | Carlton | 3 (0) |
- ^{1} Playing statistics correct to the end of 1897.

Samuel Otto John Buck (born 15 November 1876) was an Australian rules footballer who played with Carlton in the Victorian Football League (VFL). He had previously been a member of Carlton's 1896 VFA team.

== Family ==
The son of the watchmaker Francis James Buck (1849–1916), and Ann Elizabeth "Nettie" Buck (1846–1897), née Sparks, Samuel Otto John Buck was born at St Arnaud, Victoria on 15 November 1876.

He married Florence Loveday Hince (1880–1902) in 1897. He married Cecilia Hickey (1882-) in 1904.

== Football ==
He was a member of the Carlton team that played against Fitzroy in the first game of the first VFL season, at the Brunswick Street Oval, on 8 May 1897.

== See also ==
- List of Carlton Football Club players
