= Alick Ogilvie =

Australian rules footballer (1887–1915)

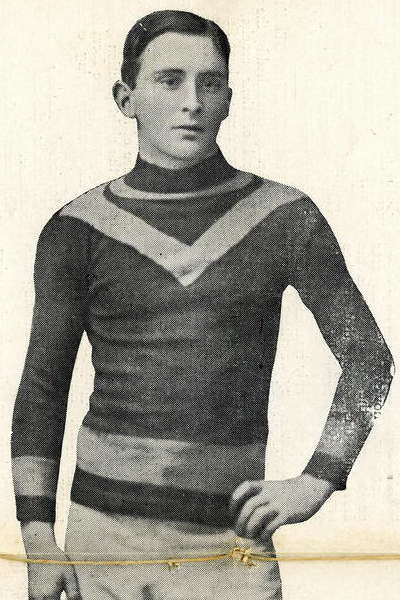
- Ogilvie in 1910

Personal information
- Full name: Thomas Alexander Ogilvie
- Born: 7 January 1887; Williamstown, Victoria
- Died: 18 August 1915 (aged 28); Valletta, Malta
- Original team: Scotch College

Playing career^{1}
Years	Club	Games (Goals)
1905	Melbourne	1 (1)
1908–1909	University	27 (20)
Total		28 (21)
- ^{1} Playing statistics correct to the end of 1909.

Thomas Alexander Ogilvie (7 January 1887 – 18 August 1915) was an Australian rules footballer who played for the University Football Club and Melbourne Football Club in the Victorian Football League (VFL).

== Family ==
Alick Ogilvie was born in Williamstown in 1887, the youngest child of Captain John Ogilvie and Elizabeth Ogilvie, née Henderson. He was the younger brother of Melbourne player Laurie Ogilvie. He married Sarah Annie "Sadie" Fenandez (1887–1937). They had one child: Elizabeth (a.k.a. "Betty").

== Education ==
He was educated at Scotch College, Melbourne, where he was captain of the first XVIII in 1904. He then enrolled to study law at the University of Melbourne in 1905, residing in Ormond College.

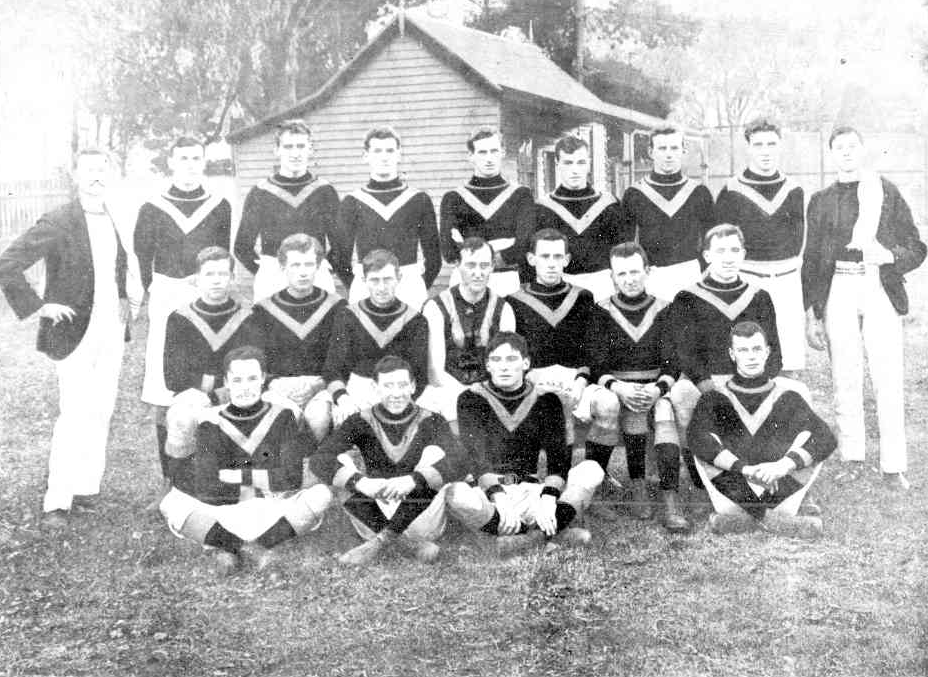
University VFL Team: 23 May 1908: A. Oglivie, third from left, front row.

== Football ==
During his first year of study he made single appearance for Melbourne against Geelong during the 1905 VFL season.

When University was admitted to the VFL for the 1908 season, he resumed his VFL football career, and played for University in its first VFL match (against Carlton). In all, he made 27 appearances and mostly playing as a forward. He was regarded as one of the team's leading players and represented Victoria in the 1908 Melbourne Carnival.

== Law ==
Having completed his degree, Ogilvie was conditionally admitted to practice law in November 1911. His admission was subsequently confirmed in November 1912. He commenced his legal practice with Mr W. M. Strong in Rutherglen and Corowa.

== Military career ==
In September 1914, Ogilvie enlisted with the 12th Infantry Battalion in Morphettville, South Australia. He departed Melbourne on HMAT Geelong on 17 September 1914 and commenced training at Mena camp in Egypt in early 1915. Whilst in training, he faced a court martial proceeding on 23 February 1915 for not returning to camp on time from granted leave. He noted in his defence that he overstayed his leave by reason of falling asleep whilst in town. Ogilvie was sentenced to reduction to ranks.

The 12th battalion was mobilised and participated in the ANZAC landing at Gallipoli. Ogilvie quickly regained rank, being promoted again to corporal, then second lieutenant by 10 July 1915.

== Death ==
In August, the 12th Battalion contributed two companies to the attack on Lone Pine. It was here that Ogilvie sustained a severe gunshot wound to the right eye on 7 August 1915. Ogilvie's condition was noted as dangerously ill and on 12 August 1915 he was shipped on the Hospital Transport Dunluce Castle to the Auberge de Baviere hospital in Valletta, Malta. Ogilvie died of his wounds on 18 August 1915, and was buried at Pieta Military Cemetery.

== See also ==
- List of Victorian Football League players who died on active service
- 1908 Melbourne Carnival
