= Daniel Pearce (footballer) =

Australian rules footballer

Personal information
- Full name: Daniel Pearce
- Born: 22 January 1993 (age 33)
- Original team: Oakleigh Chargers (TAC Cup)
- Draft: No. 49, 2011 National Draft, Western Bulldogs
- Height: 181 cm (5 ft 11 in)
- Weight: 78 kg (172 lb)

Playing career^{1}
Years	Club	Games (Goals)
2012–2015	Western Bulldogs	6 (0)
- ^{1} Playing statistics correct to the end of 2015.

Daniel Pearce (born 22 January 1993) is a former professional Australian rules footballer who played for the Western Bulldogs in the Australian Football League (AFL). He was drafted with pick No. 49 in the 2011 national draft. Pearce made his debut in round 9, 2012, against Geelong at Etihad Stadium. He was delisted at the conclusion of the 2015 AFL season.
