= Algy Vosilaitis =

Australian rules footballer

- Vosilaitis in June 1964

Personal information
- Full name: Algis Vosilaitis
- Born: 29 January 1943
- Died: 9 April 2017 (aged 74)
- Original team: Seddon
- Height: 183 cm (6 ft 0 in)
- Weight: 82 kg (181 lb)

Playing career^{1}
Years	Club	Games (Goals)
1964–1966	Footscray	28 (14)
- ^{1} Playing statistics correct to the end of 1966.

Algis "Algy" Vosilaitis (29 January 1943 – 9 April 2017) was an Australian rules footballer who played for the Footscray Football Club in the Victorian Football League (VFL).
