= Herman Dohrmann =

Australian rules footballer

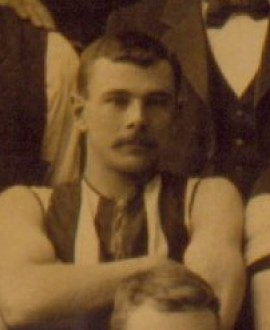
- Dohrmann in 1896 during his Collingwood VFA career

Personal information
- Full name: Herman Joseph Dohrmann
- Born: 7 September 1873; Melbourne, Victoria
- Died: 30 October 1957 (aged 84); Brunswick East, Victoria
- Original team: Perth

Playing career^{1}
Years	Club	Games (Goals)
1893	North Melbourne (VFA)	
1895–1896	Collingwood (VFA)	
1897	Rovers (WAFL)	
1898–1899	Carlton	12 (2)
- ^{1} Playing statistics correct to the end of 1899.

Herman Joseph Dohrmann (7 September 1873 – 30 October 1957) was an Australian rules footballer who played with Carlton in the Victorian Football League (VFL).

Dohrmann played with various clubs prior to Carlton, including Carlton Juniors, Collingwood (VFA), and Nth Melbourne (VFA) and Rovers (WAFL).
