= Ramsay Anderson =

Australian rules footballer

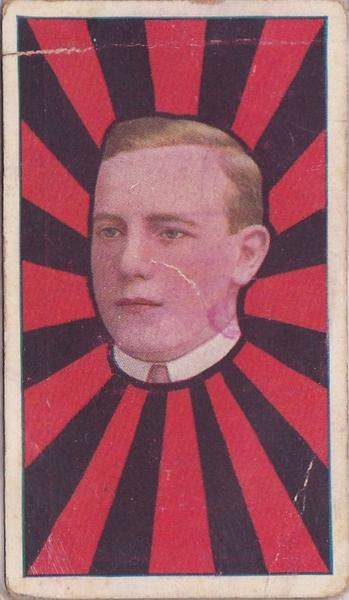
- Cigarette card of Anderson in 1911

Personal information
- Full name: David Ramsay Anderson
- Born: 2 May 1888; Edinburgh, Scotland
- Died: 27 May 1962 (aged 74); Heidelberg, Victoria
- Original team: South Yarra
- Position: Rover

Playing career^{1}
Years	Club	Games (Goals)
1910–11	Essendon	28 (0)
1912	University	3 (0)
Total		31 (0)
- ^{1} Playing statistics correct to the end of 1912.

David Ramsay Anderson (2 May 1888 – 27 May 1962) was an Australian rules footballer who played with Essendon and University in the Victorian Football League (VFL).
