= Jimmy Gordon (Australian rules footballer) =

Australian rules footballer

Personal information
- Full name: James Duncan Gordon
- Born: 1 January 1896; Williamstown, Victoria
- Died: 30 September 1918 (aged 22); Mont Saint-Quentin, France
- Original team: Elsternwick

Playing career^{1}
Years	Club	Games (Goals)
1913–1914	Essendon	8 (11)
- ^{1} Playing statistics correct to the end of 1914.

James Duncan Gordon (1 January 1896 – 30 September 1918) was an Australian rules footballer who played with Essendon in the Victorian Football League (VFL).

== Family ==
The son of James Duncan, and Blanche Eleanor Duncan, née De Wart, née Edwards, James Duncan Gordon was born in Williamstown, Victoria on 1 January 1896.

== Football ==
Recruited from Elsternwick, Gordon was a rover and half-forward who made his debut for Essendon, at the age of 18 years, against University on 9 August 1913; and, in that match, Gordon kicked the winning goal after the final bell. Shockingly, as of 2024, Essendon has never won a game with a goal after the siren since.

== Military service ==
He served as a bombardier in the army during World War I and was killed in action, in France, on 30 September 1918.

His step-brother, Ewen James Gordon (1891–1916), who also served in the First AIF, was also killed in action (on 18 August 1916).

== See also ==
- List of Victorian Football League players who died on active service
