= Thomas Leather =

Australian cricketer (1910–1991)

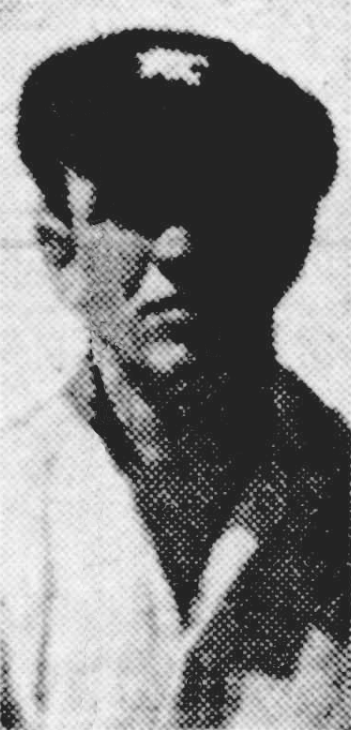

Personal information
- Full name: Thomas William Leather
- Born: 2 June 1910; Rutherglen, Scotland
- Died: 10 May 1991 (aged 80); Prahran, Australia
- Batting: Right-handed
- Bowling: Right-arm fast-medium
- Role: Bowler

Domestic team information
- Years: Team
- 1933/34–1934/35: Victoria

Career statistics
Competition	First-class
Matches	19
Runs scored	219
Batting average	13.68
100s/50s	0/0
Top score	46*
Balls bowled	3,037
Wickets	63
Bowling average	20.19
5 wickets in innings	3
10 wickets in match	0
Best bowling	5/27
Catches/stumpings	8/–
- Source: CricketArchive, 8 October 2022

Thomas William Leather (2 June 1910 – 10 May 1991) was an Australian first-class cricketer who represented Victoria. He also played Australian rules football with North Melbourne in the Victorian Football League (VFL).

== Family ==
Thomas William Leather was born at Rutherglen, Scotland on 2 June 1910.

He married Edith Dorothy Ponsford (1904–1984), the sister of Bill Ponsford in 1939. They had two children; a daughter and a son. Their son, John Ponsford Leather, died suddenly in 1950, at the age of seven.

== Education ==
He attended Caulfield Grammar School in 1925 and 1926.

== Football ==
=== North Melbourne (VFL) ===
Leather played 16 games and kicked 11 goals for North Melbourne in a brief career during the 1932 and 1933 VFL seasons.

=== Williamstown (VFA) ===
Granted a permit by the VFA to transfer from St Kilda to Williamstown on 12 April 1939, he played in 8 games for the Williamstown Football Club, in the VFA, in 1939.

== Cricket ==
He appeared in four first-class cricket matches for Victoria in 1934 and 1935, taking 14 wickets at 26.07. On the back of these performances, he was picked to tour Ceylon and India with the Australian cricket team in 1935–36. Australia's Test team was touring South Africa at the time so this was a second string side. As a result, the matches against India, which Leather took part in, were given first-class status but were not Test matches.

After going wicket-less in their match against Ceylon, Leather went to India and played in all four 'Tests'. He took 21 wickets in those matches, taking five wicket hauls in Calcutta and Lahore to finish the Indian tour with an impressive 47 first-class wickets at 17.25. This made him Australia's most successful bowler for the tour after Frederick Mair and Ron Oxenham.

Although Leather was only 25 when he returned to Australia, he played just one more first-class match in his career. This was for the Don Bradman's XI in the Bardsley-Gregory Testimonial Match against the Victor Richardson's XI at the Sydney Cricket Ground.

== Military service ==
He enlisted in the Second AIF on 4 June 1940, and was discharged on the grounds of "being medically unfit for service not occasioned by his own defaults" on 6 August 1940.
