= Stewart Geddes =

Australian rules footballer & coach (1879–1952)

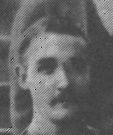

Personal information
- Full name: Stewart Drummond Geddes
- Born: 6 March 1879; Richmond, Victoria
- Died: 6 May 1952 (aged 73); Trafalgar, Victoria
- Original team: Richmond Juniors

Playing career^{1}
Years	Club	Games (Goals)
1897–1902	Melbourne	81 (8)
1904	Richmond (VFA)	11 (3)
1905	St Kilda	10 (2)
1908–1912, 1914–1915	West Torrens	70 (24)
Total		171 (37)
- ^{1} Playing statistics correct to the end of 1905.

Career highlights
- VFL premiership player: 1900

Stewart Drummond "Nip" Geddes (6 March 1879 – 6 May 1952) was an Australian rules footballer who played for the Melbourne Football Club and St Kilda Football Club in the Victorian Football League (VFL).

== Family ==
The youngest of the seven children of William Geddes (1827–1886), and Catherine Stewart Geddes (1833–1906), née Lilburn, Stewart Drummond Geddes was born in Richmond, Victoria on 6 March 1879. He died at Trafalgar, Victoria on 6 May 1952.

== Football ==
"'Nip' Geddes, a follower, ranks with the best the State has produced. He was a brilliant high mark and a fine drop-kick."
"Possibly the finest exponent of [the stab kick] we have ever seen … Nip's reputation was that he could, running at his top, stab a bail on to a threepenny piece thirty yards away."

=== Melbourne (VFL) ===
Geddes arrived from Richmond Juniors as a defender but was used mostly on the ball by Melbourne. He took part in the historic 1897 VFL finals series and played in the 1900 VFL Grand Final, where he kicked one of Melbourne's four goals to help them claim their maiden premiership. While awaiting to be granted clearance to St Kilda, Geddes missed the 1903 and 1904 season.

=== Richmond (VFA) ===
He joined the Richmond Football Club in the VFA in the mid-season of 1904, and played eleven games for them that year.

=== St Kilda (VFL) ===
Finally granted a clearance from Melbourne, he arrived at St Kilda in 1905 but only played for one year.

=== South Broken Hill Football Club (BHFL) ===
In 1907 he was playing with the South Broken Hill Football Club in the Broken Hill Football League.

=== West Torrens (SAFL) ===
He later played with West Torrens, captaining the South Australian Football League club in 1908 and 1909.

Appointed coach in 1914, the team came fourth in 1914, and fifth in 1915 (due to the First World War, the SAFL competition was suspended in 1916, 1917, and 1918).

"Torrens players wore black armbands during the Alberton game as a mark of respect to Nip Geddes, old-time Torrens ruck star, who died this week in Melbourne. Geddes was a stalwart in the days when Torrens played on Hindmarsh Oval."

== See also ==
- 1908 Melbourne Carnival
