= George Sutherland (footballer) =

Australian rules footballer

Personal information
- Full name: George Sutherland
- Born: 24 February 1876; Glasgow, Scotland
- Died: 19 November 1956 (aged 80)
- Original team: Collegians

Playing career^{1}
Years	Club	Games (Goals)
1900–1901	St Kilda	17 (15)
- ^{1} Playing statistics correct to the end of 1901.

George Sutherland (24 February 1876 – 19 November 1956) was an Australian rules footballer who played for St Kilda in the Victorian Football League (VFL).

Sutherland, a Collegians recruit, was born in Scotland. He made his debut in the opening round of the 1900 VFL season and kicked three goals from full-forward to help St Kilda register a rare victory. With a season-ending tally of 13 goals, Sutherland topped the St Kilda goal-kicking that year.
