= Hugh Plowman =

Australian rules footballer

Personal information
- Full name: Hugh McDonald Plowman
- Born: 21 April 1889; South Melbourne, Victoria
- Died: 19 July 1916 (aged 27); Fromelles, France
- Original team: Brighton
- Position: Defence

Playing career^{1}
| Years | Club | Games (Goals) |
| 1910–12 | St Kilda | 26 (1) |
- ^{1} Playing statistics correct to the end of 1912.

Hugh McDonald Plowman (21 April 1889 – 19 July 1916) was an Australian rules footballer who played with St Kilda in the Victorian Football League. Also an adept cricketer, he enlisted in the army during World War I. He met the Prince of Wales after receiving his commission as an officer, but was killed in action during the Attack at Fromelles in 1916.

== See also ==
- List of Victorian Football League players who died on active service
