= Stanley McKenzie =

Australian rules footballer and cricketer

Stan McKenzie

Personal information
- Full name: Matthew Stanley McKenzie
- Born: 17 May 1890; Launceston, Tasmania
- Died: 8 December 1915 (aged 25); HMHS Gloucester Castle, Alexandria, Egypt
- Original team: Launceston
- Height: 184 cm (6 ft 0 in)
- Weight: 77 kg (170 lb)

Playing career^{1}
Years	Club	Games (Goals)
1914	Carlton	14 (6)
- ^{1} Playing statistics correct to the end of 1914.

Matthew Stanley McKenzie (17 May 1890 – 8 December 1915) was an Australian first-class cricketer and Australian rules footballer.

== Family ==
The son of Henry McKenzie (1850–1929), and Jane Danks McKenzie, née Young, Matthew Stanley McKenzie was born in Launceston, Tasmania on 17 May 1890.

His brother, George Frank McKenzie (1892-), was awarded the Distinguished Conduct Medal in 1915.

== Education ==
He was educated at Scotch College, Launceston.

== Cricket ==
A right-handed opening batsman, he played five first-class matches for Tasmania between 1910 and 1913.

== Football ==
McKenzie was also an accomplished footballer, and he represented Tasmania at the 1911 Adelaide Carnival. He played club football for Launceston in the Northern Tasmanian Football Association in the early 1910s. He was part of the team which forfeited the 1913 Tasmanian State Premiership match, and he along with team-mates were consequently issued amateur sports suspensions by the Tasmanian Football League, which became a major off-field dispute between Northern Tasmania and Southern Tasmania in the months that followed. In the fall-out, when McKenzie was selected by the Northern Tasmanian Cricket Association (which refused to recognise the validity of the suspension) to play for the North XI in an intrastate cricket match against the South XI team in December 1913, the South called off the match.

He moved to Victoria at the start of 1914, and joined both the Carlton Football Club and the Carlton Cricket Club. His senior VFL career with Carlton did not begin until June 1914, when the dispute in Tasmania had ended and his suspension was lifted. He played 14 VFL games for the year, including a Preliminary Final, but he was omitted from the winning 1914 Grand Final team on form. McKenzie's final game for Carlton was in the 1914 Championship of Australia match against Port Adelaide.

== Military service ==
McKenzie enlisted with the First AIF (on 17 November 1914) as a medical orderly. He was a Sergeant with the 1st Australian Clearing Hospital, First A.I.F., and spent some time at Gallipoli before being moved to Alexandria in Egypt.

== Death ==
He died of appendicitis on the hospital ship HMHS Gloucester Castle, in Alexandria Harbour, Egypt, on 8 December 1915, and was buried at the Alexandria (Chatby) Military Cemetery.

== See also ==
- List of Tasmanian representative cricketers
- List of cricketers who were killed during military service
- List of Victorian Football League players who died on active service
