= Alex Barlow =

Australian rules footballer

Personal information
- Full name: Alexander George Barlow
- Born: 10 April 1880; Carlton, Victoria
- Died: 21 April 1937 (aged 57); Brighton, Victoria
- Original team: Yarram Yarram

Playing career^{1}
Years	Club	Games (Goals)
1901–1903	Carlton	14 (0)
- ^{1} Playing statistics correct to the end of 1903.

Alex Barlow (10 April 1880 – 21 April 1937) was an Australian rules footballer who played for the Carlton Football Club in the Victorian Football League (VFL).

Barlow was born Alexander George Merritt, the son of Harriet Annie Merritt, and took the surname Barlow when she married George Booker Barlow in 1883.
