= Grant Lawrie =

Australian rules footballer

Personal information
- Full name: Grant Lawrie
- Born: 29 November 1958 (age 67)
- Original team: Bulleen-Templestowe
- Height: 192 cm (6 ft 4 in)
- Weight: 81 kg (179 lb)

Playing career^{1}
Years	Club	Games (Goals)
1978–1988	Fitzroy	151 (56)
1990	St Kilda	17 (2)
Total		168 (58)
- ^{1} Playing statistics correct to the end of 1990.

Grant Lawrie (born 29 November 1958) is a former Australian rules footballer who played with Fitzroy and St Kilda in the Victorian/Australian Football League (VFL/AFL).

Lawrie, who came from Bulleen-Templestowe, started his VFL career as a half forward flanker and on one occasion kicked four goals against Collingwood in his debut season. After putting together 14 appearances in his first three years at the club, Lawrie became an integral part of the team from 1981 as a hard running defender. He played all 22 games in 1982 and polled 10 Brownlow Medal votes to finish at Fitzroy's second best vote getter that year. The following season he was selected to represent Victoria at interstate football.

Nicknamed "Sticks", Lawrie played seven finals during his time with Fitzroy but missed the 1986 preliminary final. He retired after the 1988 VFL season and spent 1989 at Box Hill. St Kilda got him back to the league in 1990 when they picked him up with the 91st selection of national draft.

During his coaching career, Lawrie was senior coach of Banyule, Greensborough, West Preston and the Western Jets.
