= Andy Dougall =

Australian rules footballer

Andrew Dougall
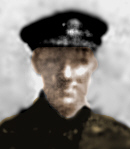
- Dougall in 1917

Personal information
- Full name: Andrew William Dougall
- Born: 22 May 1884; Melbourne
- Died: 11 November 1941 (aged 57); Hilton, South Australia
- Height: 180 cm (5 ft 11 in)
- Weight: 71 kg (157 lb)
- Position: Wing

Playing career^{1}
| Years | Club | Games (Goals) |
| 1902 | Carlton | 2 (0) |
- ^{1} Playing statistics correct to the end of 1902.

Andrew William Dougall (22 May 1884 – 11 November 1941) was an Australian rules footballer who played for the Carlton Football Club in the Victorian Football League (VFL).

== Change of name ==
He enlisted in the first AIF under the name of James Davidson (the reason for this decision has never been explained); and, it seems, he went under that name for the rest of his life.

== Family ==
The son of Scottish migrants, William Dougall (1855-1929) and Mary Dougall (1856-1904), née Mitchell, he was born in Melbourne on 22 May 1884. He married Rita Isobel Ridley (1894-), née Law (under the name "Andrew William Dougall") in South Australia in 1931.

One brother, Lieutenant Norman Dougall (1887-1917) — who attended Geelong College (1898-1902), and served in the First AIF, was also awarded the Military Cross in 1917 ("for conspicuus gallantry and devotion to duty") — was killed in action at Bullecourt on 6 May 1917.

A second brother, Major John Mitchell Dougall (1879-1926), who had served with the 79th Cameron Highlanders in the Boer War, also served in the First AIF.

== Education ==
He attended Geelong College. He studied at the University of Melbourne for at least one term.

== Football ==
He played two First XVIII matches for Carlton Football Club: on 12 July 1902 (round 11), on the wing, against Melbourne, and, in the last of the home-and-away matches for the season, on 2 August 1902 (round 14), in the forward pocket, against Collingwood. He competed as a half-miler for Coburg Harriers for many years.

== Military service ==
He enlisted in the First AIF, on 30 August 1914; and, among the first to land at Gallipoli in 25 April 1915, he sustained a bullet wound in his right forearm (he was removed to Cairo for treatment, and rejoined his regiment at Gallipoli on 22 June 1915). With the rank of Lieutenant (he was a Temporary Captain), he was awarded the Military Cross in 1919.

== Death ==
He died in Hilton, South Australia on 11 November 1941. His death notice identified him as "James Davidson".
