= Charlie Norris (footballer) =

Australian rules footballer and umpire

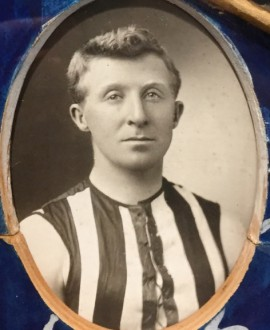
- Norris in 1910

Personal information
- Born: 23 July 1881; Heathcote, Victoria
- Died: 16 February 1940 (aged 58); Fitzroy North, Victoria
- Original team: California Gully (BFL)
- Height: 178 cm (5 ft 10 in)
- Weight: 80 kg (176 lb)

Playing career^{1}
Years	Club	Games (Goals)
1910–1911	Collingwood	18 (4)
1911–1918	Fitzroy	106 (19)
Total		124 (23)
- ^{1} Playing statistics correct to the end of 1918.

Charles Albert Norris (23 July 1881 – 16 February 1940) was an Australian rules footballer who played with Collingwood and Fitzroy in the Victorian Football League (VFL). Norris remains the oldest player to debut in the VFL/AFL and go on to play 100 games. He was also a country field umpire with the VFL in 1921.

== Playing career ==
Originally from Bendigo Football League club California Gully, Norris came to Melbourne and played for Northcote in the Victorian Football Association (VFA) before transferring to Collingwood in July 1910. Playing mostly as a follower, Norris made up for his 178 cm with a good turn of speed as indicated by his victory in three footraces earlier that year. A gripman on the tramways Norris competed at the employees picnic coming first in the Denham Plate (all-comers), gripmen and 440 yards events. He continued to place in similar events for much of his career despite the fact he debuted in the VFL aged 28.

Norris was part of the 1910 Collingwood premiership win over rivals Carlton. Named in a back pocket Norris effectively stepped into the ruck position when teammate Dave Ryan injured an elbow in the second quarter.

Midway through the following season, Norris crossed to Fitzroy. This was just in time for them to take on the Magpies, against whom he performed creditably first up.

In his time with Fitzroy, Norris played in the club's 1913 and 1916 premiership sides as well as Fitzroy's Grand Final loss the following year. He was named amongst the best players in the latter two matches. Norris was a major influence in Fitzroy's re-emergence as a league power following a number of indifferent seasons.

Moving on from Fitzroy in 1919 he transferred to North Melbourne in the Victorian Football Association (VFA) where he suffered a broken nose against Williamstown in one of his first matches. Norris played well for the remainder of home and away season but his form, much like North's, dropped off during the finals. North made the 1919 VFA Grand Final, but were defeated by Footscray; Norris appears to have had little effect on the result.

The following year, Norris returned to Northcote and played out his final year. Northcote finished three games out of finals contention.

Aged 39, Norris retired at the end of the 1920 season.

== Umpiring ==
Immediately following his retirement as a player, Norris began a short-lived umpiring career with the VFL.

His first appointment was at Cobden; in the ensuing two months, he officiated as a field umpire in nine different competitions across Victoria. Heatherton versus Mordialloc in the Federal Football League was his tenth and final match as a VFL umpire.

== Personal life ==
Norris was born in Heathcote, Victoria, and was one of eleven children. He married Beatrice in 1903 and moved to Bendigo; afterwards, Norris moved to Melbourne, where he worked as a tram driver. He died from pleurisy and pneumonia in 1940. His great-great-grandson Will Hoskin-Elliott is now also a footballer for Collingwood. Will played 52 matches with the Greater Western Sydney Giants.
