= Les MacPherson =

Australian rules footballer

Personal information
- Full name: Leslie Mitchell MacPherson
- Born: 17 May 1880; Balranald, New South Wales
- Died: 14 June 1941 (aged 61); Melbourne
- Original team: Cumloden College
- Height: 175 cm (5 ft 9 in)
- Weight: 67 kg (148 lb)

Playing career^{1}
Years	Club	Games (Goals)
1898–99	Melbourne	5 (1)
- ^{1} Playing statistics correct to the end of 1899.

Leslie Mitchell MacPherson (17 May 1880 – 14 June 1941) was an Australian rules footballer who played with Melbourne in the Victorian Football League (VFL).
