= Ewan Thompson =

Australian rules footballer (born 1977)

Personal information
- Full name: Ewan Thompson
- Born: 29 March 1977 (age 49); Scotland
- Original teams: Northern U18s, (TAC Cup)
- Draft: No. 59, 1995 AFL draft
- Height: 179 cm (5 ft 10 in)
- Weight: 84 kg (185 lb)

Playing career^{1}
Years	Club	Games (Goals)
1997	Richmond	4 (1)
- ^{1} Playing statistics correct to the end of 1997.

Ewan Thompson (born 29 March 1977) is a former Australian rules footballer who played for Richmond in the Australian Football League (AFL) in 1997. He was recruited from the Northern Knights in the TAC Cup with the 59th selection in the 1995 AFL draft.
