= John Bell (footballer, born 1886) =

Australian rules footballer

Personal information
- Full name: John Bell
- Born: 7 October 1886; Toorak, Victoria
- Died: 27 December 1917 (aged 31); Cambrai, France
- Original team: Mercantile / Geelong Grammar

Playing career^{1}
Years	Club	Games (Goals)
1906, 1908	Geelong	18 (1)
- ^{1} Playing statistics correct to the end of 1908.

John Bell (7 October 1886 – 27 December 1917) was an Australian rules footballer who played with Geelong Football Club in the Victorian Football League (VFL).

== Family ==
The son of John Bell (1855–1906), and Annie Carstairs Bell (1854–1935), née Russell, John Bell was born at Toorak, Victoria on 7 October 1886.

One of his brothers, Lieutenant George Russell Bell (1892–1918), also died on active service in World War One.

== Education ==
He attended Geelong Grammar School from 1896 to 1905.

== Football career ==
Bell played 18 games in all, with Geelong during the 1906 and 1908 seasons.

== War service ==
He enlisted in the First AIF on 2 September 1914, and left Melbourne for overseas service on the HMAT Orvieto (A3) on 21 October 1914.

During World War I, Bell served as a pilot with the Australian Flying Corps. He initially served with No. 1 Squadron AFC, in Palestine.

Bell achieved the rank of Captain. He was later transferred to the Western Front, flying Airco DH.5s with No. 2 Squadron (2 Sqn AFC; sometimes known in British military circles as "68 Squadron").

== Death ==
He was badly wounded ("gunshot wound penetrating his chest": Service Record) and made a forced landing just behind the Allied front line on 20 November 1917, when 2 Squadron was involved in ground attack duties during the First Battle of Cambrai.

Bell died of his wounds on 27 December 1917, and he is buried at Tincourt New British Cemetery in Tincourt-Boucly, Picardy, in Northern France.

== Remembered ==
On 28 April 1931, the Bell family dedicated two stained-glass windows in the chapel of the Geelong Grammar School: the one on the left (holding the football) to John Bell, and the one on the right, to his brother George.

== See also ==
- List of Victorian Football League players who died on active service
