= William Marshall (Australian footballer) =

Willie Marshall

Personal information
- Full name: William Douglas Marshall
- Born: 9 July 1884; Scotland
- Died: 17 May 1971 (aged 86); Burwood, Victoria
- Original team: Ormond College

Playing career^{1}
| Years | Club | Games (Goals) |
| 1905 | Melbourne | 1 (0) |
| 1908 | University | 11 (0) |
| Total | | 12 (0) |
- ^{1} Playing statistics correct to the end of 1908.

William Douglas "Willie" Marshall (9 July 1884 – 17 May 1971) was an Australian rules footballer who played with Melbourne and University in the Victorian Football League (VFL).

Marshall was born in Scotland, the son of Presbyterian minister Alexander Marshall. The family emigrated to Australia in 1888, and William Marshall completed his schooling at Scotch College, Melbourne. Marshall played VFL football while studying to become a minister. In 1921 he married Josephine Taylor and he served as the Presbyterian minister in Sale for many years. After moving back to Melbourne he was appointed moderator of the Presbyterian Church of Victoria.
