= Ted McLean =

Australian rules footballer

Personal information
- Full name: Edward Finlay McLean
- Born: 12 October 1893; Geelong, Victoria
- Died: 29 May 1915 (aged 21); Gallipoli, Ottoman Turkey
- Height: 173 cm (5 ft 8 in)
- Weight: 66 kg (146 lb)

Playing career^{1}
Years	Club	Games (Goals)
1912	Geelong	2 (0)
- ^{1} Playing statistics correct to the end of 1912.

Edward Finlay McLean (12 October 1893 – 29 May 1915) was an Australian rules footballer who played with Geelong in the Victorian Football League (VFL). He was killed in action in World War I.

== Football career ==
He played two league games for Geelong, both in the 1912 VFL season, the first in round 15 against Collingwood at Victoria Park. Matched up against Collingwood wingman Percy Gibb, his performance on debut was described as promising by the Geelong Advertiser. His only other VFL appearance for Geelong came in round 18, a 37-point win by Geelong over Richmond at Corio Oval.

== Military service ==
On 18 August 1914, McLean enlisted in the army and two months later embarked from Melbourne on the HMAT Benalla (A24), to serve with the 8th Battalion. He took part in the Gallipoli Campaign and was killed in action on 29 May 1915, aged 21.

== Personal life ==
McLean, the youngest son of Norman and Jane McLean, was born in Geelong on 12 October 1893. He had two brothers, Archie and Norman.
