= Aidan Corr =

Australian rules footballer

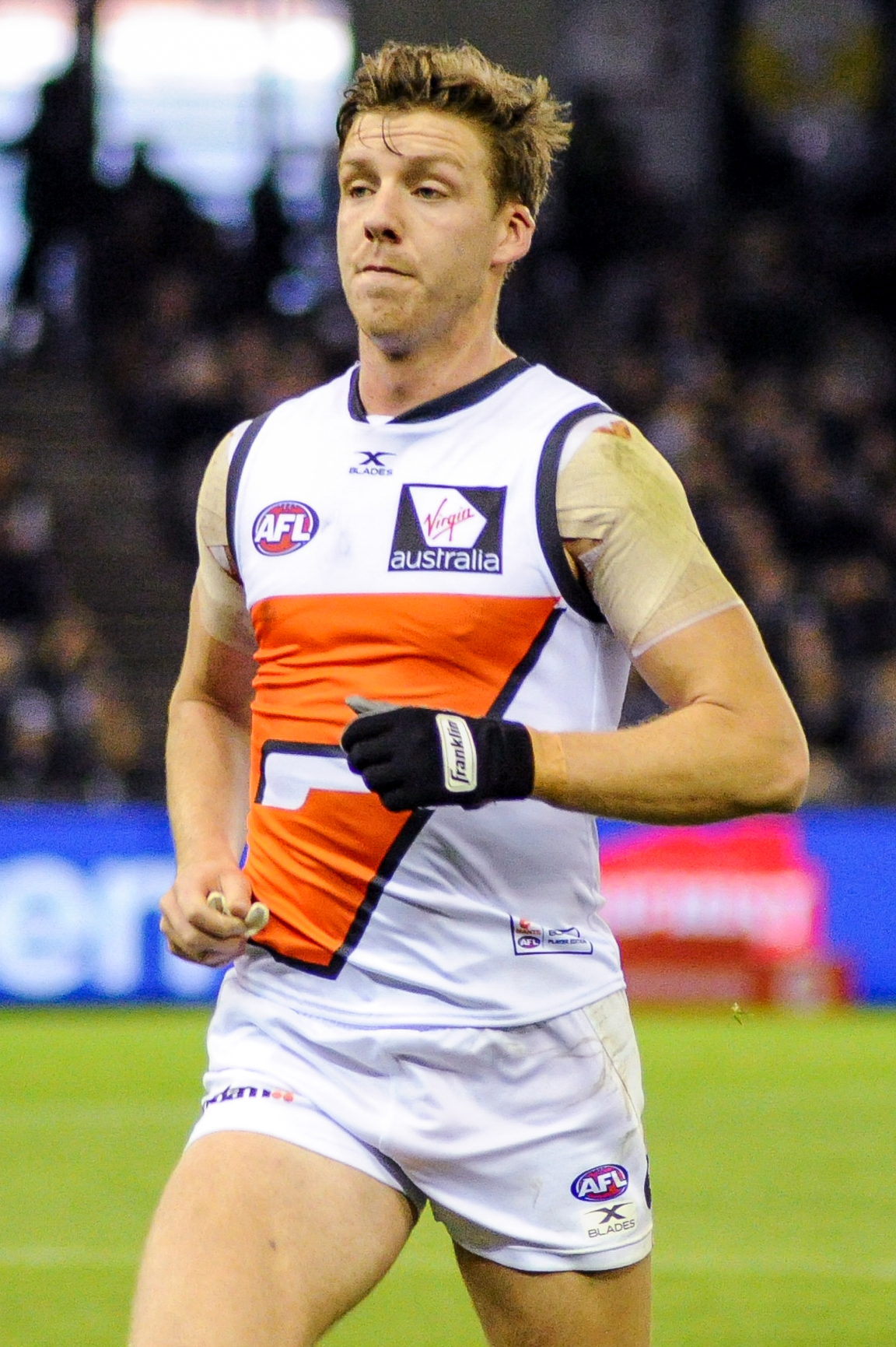
- Corr playing for Greater Western Sydney in June 2017

Personal information
- Full name: Aidan Corr
- Nickname: Apples
- Born: 17 May 1994 (age 32); Brockagh, County Tyrone, Northern Ireland
- Original team: Northern Knights (TAC Cup)
- Draft: No. 14, 2012 national draft
- Height: 195 cm (6 ft 5 in)
- Weight: 97 kg (214 lb)
- Position: Key defender

Club information
- Current club: North Melbourne
- Number: 4

Playing career^{1}
Years	Club	Games (Goals)
2013–2020	Greater Western Sydney	98 (2)
2021–	North Melbourne	90 (1)
Total		188 (3)
- ^{1} Playing statistics correct to the end of 2026.

Aidan Corr (born 17 May 1994) is a professional Australian rules footballer playing for the North Melbourne Football Club in the Australian Football League (AFL), having previously played for the Greater Western Sydney Giants . The Giants drafted the defender with pick 14 in the 2012 national draft. He debuted in round 6, 2013, against Essendon at Etihad Stadium.

Born in Brockagh in County Tyrone, Northern Ireland, Corr emigrated to Australia with his family at the age of three.

Corr departed the Giants as a free agent at the conclusion of the 2020 AFL season, moving to North Melbourne.

In September 2026, Corr signed a one year contract extension, keeping him at the Kangaroos until the end of the 2027 season.

== Statistics ==
Updated to the end of round 22, 2026.

Legend
G	Goals	K	Kicks	D	Disposals	T	Tackles
B	Behinds	H	Handballs	M	Marks

Season	Team	No.	Games	Totals							Averages (per game)							Votes
Season	Team	No.	Games	G	B	K	H	D	M	T	G	B	K	H	D	M	T	Votes
2013	Greater Western Sydney	35	10	1	0	36	44	80	24	16	0.1	0.0	3.6	4.4	8.0	2.4	1.6	0
2014	Greater Western Sydney	35	4	0	0	18	11	29	9	11	0.0	0.0	4.5	2.8	7.3	2.3	2.8	0
2015	Greater Western Sydney	35	19	0	0	89	74	163	54	42	0.0	0.0	4.7	3.9	8.6	2.8	2.2	0
2016	Greater Western Sydney	35	3	0	0	14	11	25	10	8	0.0	0.0	4.7	3.7	8.3	3.3	2.7	0
2017	Greater Western Sydney	35	23	0	0	159	96	255	90	41	0.0	0.0	6.9	4.2	11.1	3.9	1.8	0
2018	Greater Western Sydney	35	16	1	1	104	59	163	54	34	0.1	0.1	6.5	3.7	10.2	3.4	2.1	0
2019	Greater Western Sydney	35	8	0	0	77	25	102	27	13	0.0	0.0	9.6	3.1	12.8	3.4	1.6	0
2020 (Note: The 2020 season was played with 17 home-and-away matches per team (down from 22) and 16-minute quarters with time on (down from 20-minute quarters with time on) due to the impact of the COVID-19 pandemic.)	Greater Western Sydney	35	15	0	1	143	37	180	59	22	0.0	0.1	9.5	2.5	12.0	3.9	1.5	0
2021	North Melbourne	4	2	0	1	19	13	32	9	5	0.0	0.5	9.5	6.5	16.0	4.5	2.5	0
2022	North Melbourne	4	20	0	0	226	67	293	103	23	0.0	0.0	11.3	3.4	14.7	5.2	1.2	0
2023	North Melbourne	4	19	1	0	206	81	287	93	23	0.1	0.0	10.8	4.3	15.1	4.9	1.2	0
2024	North Melbourne	4	23	0	0	190	99	289	103	32	0.0	0.0	8.3	4.3	12.6	4.5	1.4	0
2025	North Melbourne	4	10	0	0	100	37	137	43	18	0.0	0.0	10.0	3.7	13.7	4.3	1.8	0
2026	North Melbourne	4	14	0	0	109	63	172	54	14	0.0	0.0	7.8	4.5	12.3	3.9	1.0	0
Career			186	3	3	1490	717	2207	732	302	0.0	0.0	8.0	3.9	11.9	3.9	1.6	0
