= Paul Stewart (Australian footballer) =

Australian rules footballer

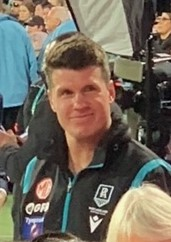

Personal information
- Full name: Paul Stewart
- Born: 10 July 1987 (age 39)
- Original team: Woodville-West Torrens (SANFL)
- Draft: No. 23, 2006 National Draft, Port Adelaide
- Height: 191 cm (6 ft 3 in)
- Weight: 90 kg (198 lb)
- Position: Defender

Playing career^{1}
Years	Club	Games (Goals)
2008–2016	Port Adelaide	101 (33)
- ^{1} Playing statistics correct to the end of 2016.

Paul Stewart (born 10 July 1987) is a former professional Australian rules footballer who played for the Port Adelaide Football Club in the Australian Football League (AFL).

From Adelaide, Stewart started the 2006 SANFL season in the Woodville-West Torrens Under-19s, made his league debut during the season and by the end of year had played in Woodville-West Torrens successful Grand Final.

Stewart was drafted by Port Adelaide in the second round in the 2006 AFL draft, pick number 23 overall. He was part of the young guns Port Adelaide recruited in the 2006 draft, with teammate Brett Ebert saying the group is the best recruits he has seen at the club in four years.

Stewart, who has played either in the midfield/wing or as a forward, and was already a fan of Port Adelaide before being drafted.

After spending the 2007 AFL season continuing to play with Woodville-West Torrens, Stewart made his senior AFL debut in round 1, 2008 against reigning premiers Geelong. Stewart had a very good debut gaining a very respectable 18 disposals, with 7 kicks, 11 handballs and 5 marks. In round 15, 2012 in Showdown 33 he was placed as forward. He kicked 4 goals the highest by a Port Adelaide player in that game. Even though Port Adelaide lost by 58, they named him as a forward the next game and he booted 2 goals. In round 17, he became a star forward getting a five-goal haul to help Port Adelaide defeat Melbourne by 28 points.

At the conclusion of the 2016 season, Stewart was delisted by Port Adelaide.
