= Bruce Sloss =

Australian rules footballer (1889–1917)

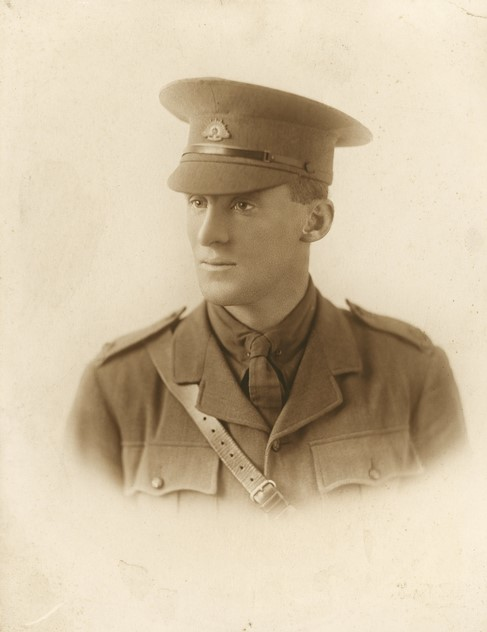

Personal information
- Full name: Bruce Moses Farquhar Sloss
- Born: 21 January 1889; Malvern East, Victoria
- Died: 4 January 1917 (aged 27); Armentières, France
- Debut: 4 May 1907, Essendon vs. Melbourne, at Melbourne Cricket Ground
- Height: 180 cm (5 ft 11 in)
- Weight: 76 kg (168 lb)

Playing career^{1}
| Years | Club | Games (Goals) |
| 1907–1908 | Essendon | 3 (0) |
| 1910–1914 | South Melbourne | 81 (44) |
| Total | | 84 (44) |
- ^{1} Playing statistics correct to the end of 1914.

Career highlights
- AIF Pioneer Exhibition Game, London, 28 October 1916

Bruce Moses Farquhar Sloss (21 January 1889 – 4 January 1917) was an Australian rules footballer who played as a follower with Essendon and South Melbourne in the Victorian Football League (VFL), and with Brighton in the Victorian Football Association (VFA).

== Early life ==
Bruce Sloss, the youngest son of James Davis and Christina Sloss, was born in East Malvern on 21 January 1889.

As he grew up, he was a keen footballer and cricketer, and he taught Bible classes at the Malvern Presbyterian Church – where his name appears on its Roll of Honour.

== Essendon ==
When just 18, Sloss was invited to train with Essendon. He played his first match in round 2 of the 1907 season against Melbourne. He played one more senior match for Essendon that year, against Geelong, in round 8; and he played his third and last senior game for Essendon in round 2 of the 1908 season.

== Brighton ==
Having realized that he would not gain regular selection with Essendon, he left Essendon after that second round match and went to the VFA Club, Brighton.

He played for Brighton for the remainder of the 1908 season, the entire 1909 season, and the first half of the 1910 season.

In 1909, he played for the VFA team that was beaten by 19 points by the South Australian Football League (SAFL), 7.8 (50) to 4.7 (31). He was one of the best on the ground for the VFA team.

== South Melbourne ==
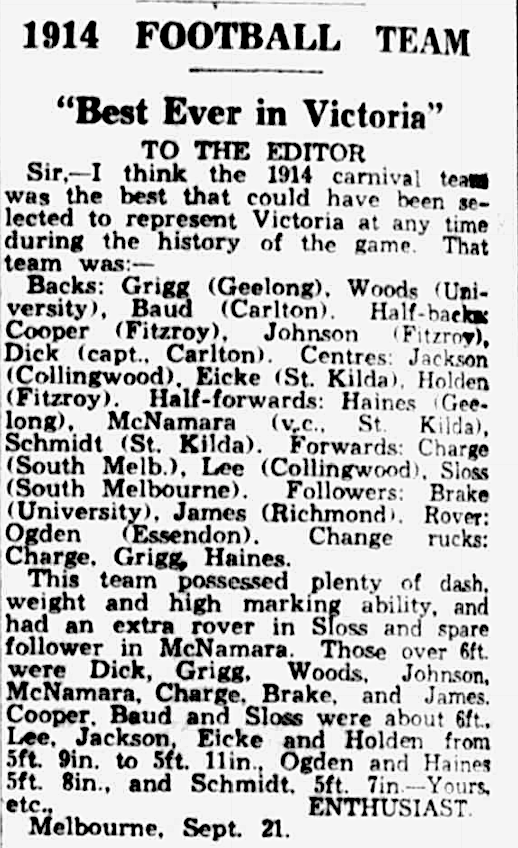
Enthusiast's Letter to the Editor The Herald, 21 Sept. 1934.

South Melbourne took some time to obtain a VFL clearance permit for him to play with them.

He was not able to play his first match for South Melbourne until the round 10 match of the 1910 season against Richmond.

Playing as a follower, he was tallish for his era and somewhat lightly framed; he was, however, renowned for his speed and agility, and for his high marking ability, and the accuracy of his long kicking.

He played a number of representative games for Victoria, including in the 1914 Sydney Carnival.

In his last VFL match, the 1914 Grand Final against Carlton – which Carlton won 6.9 (45) to an inaccurate South Melbourne's 4.15 (39) – Sloss ran himself into the ground, and nearly won the game off his own boot; and, despite South Melbourne losing, many considered Sloss to be the best player on the ground.

The eminent sporting journalist Jack Worrall – the former Australian Test cricketer and Fitzroy footballer, and the former Carlton coach and incumbent Essendon coach – writing in The Australasian, had this to say of Sloss's performance:

Sloss had no superior on the ground, his glorious efforts in the last quarter stamping him as a great footballer. He possesses all the qualities, but is apt to attempt the impossible on occasions. He marked, kicked, and ran like a champion, and almost pulled the match out of the fire by his brilliant efforts.

== Engineer ==
Sloss was employed as a maintenance engineer at a jam factory. He invented (and patented) a method for cutting melons into cubes that involved revolving circular wheels (instead of fixed knife blades) which prevented the fruit being reduced to a pulp. An article in The Recorder reported that his invention had "revolutionised the jam-making industry".

== Soldier ==
Sloss enlisted in 1915, and was trained as a machine-gun officer. He was commissioned as a Second Lieutenant on 17 January 1916, and was assigned to the 10th Machine Gun Company, First A.I.F. (the unit in which his oldest brother Roy also served). The Unit arrived in England in July 1916. Whilst the Unit was in camp (on 3 September), Sloss was promoted to Lieutenant.

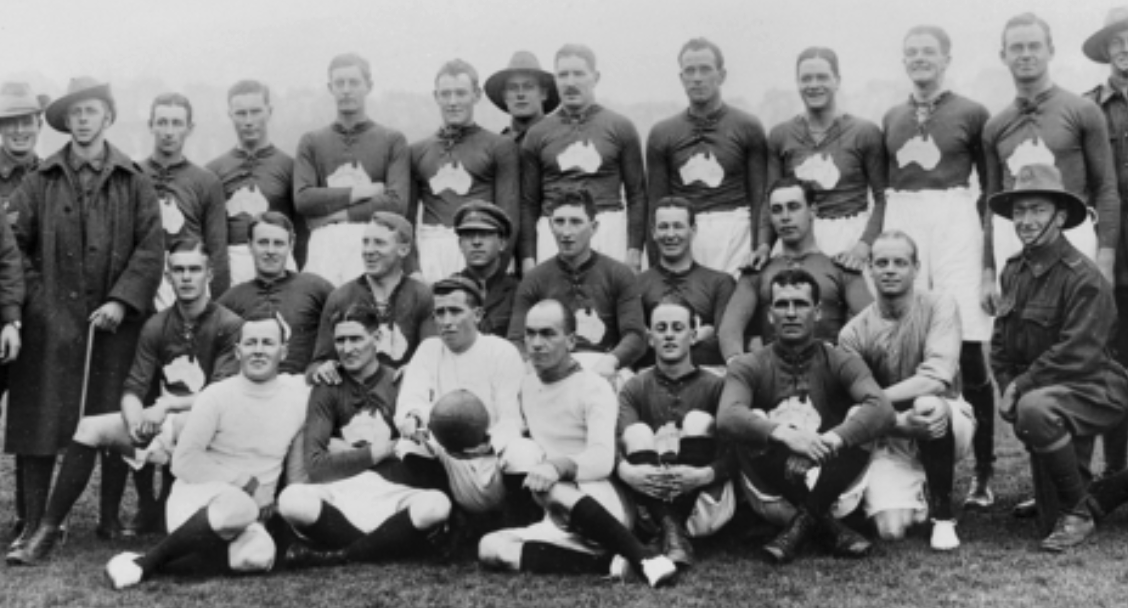
The Third Australian Divisional Team: 28 October 1916. Bruce Sloss is third player from left, middle row.

== Soldier and footballer ==
On Saturday 28 October 1916, an Australian Rules football match was held between two teams of Australian servicemen in aid of the British and French Red Cross at Queen's Club, West Kensington. Sloss was the captain of the (winning) Third Australian Divisional team in the famous match. His team beat the Australian Training Units team 6.16 (52) to 4.12 (36). A news film was taken at the match.

== Death and burial ==
Sloss arrived in France in 1916 and was headquartered behind the front at Armentieres. On 4 January 1917, after returning from the frontlines and talking to a fellow soldier, Sloss was killed instantly when a stray German artillery shell landed at his feet, showering him with white-hot shrapnel. He is buried at the Cité Bonjean Military Cemetery, Armentières, in Northern France.

== See also ==
- List of Victorian Football League players who died on active service
- 1914 Sydney Carnival
- 1916 Pioneer Exhibition Game
