= Bob Edmond =

Australian sportsman

Personal information
- Full name: Bob Edmond
- Born: 29 December 1948 (age 77); Scotland
- Original team: Bairnsdale
- Height: 188 cm (6 ft 2 in)
- Weight: 83 kg (183 lb)
- Position: Defender

Playing career^{1}
Years	Club	Games (Goals)
1967–1968	Carlton	10 (0)
- ^{1} Playing statistics correct to the end of 1968.

Bob Edmond
Medal record

Commonwealth Games
Silver medal – second place	1978 Edmonton	Weightlifting
Silver medal – second place	1982 Brisbane	Weightlifting

Bob Edmond (born 29 December 1948) is a former Australian sportsman who played Australian rules football with Carlton in the Victorian Football League (VFL) during the 1960s and won two Commonwealth Games silver medals in weightlifting.

Although predominantly a defender, Edmond could also play as a ruckman. Like his younger brother Jim, who captained VFL club Footscray, Edmond joined the league from Bairnsdale. He spent just two seasons at Carlton, including their premiership year of 1968, where he made seven appearances but could not break into the finals side.

Edmond represented Australia in the Super Heavyweight division of weightlifting at the 1976 Summer Olympics and finished in seventh position. He then competed at the 1978 Commonwealth Games, also in Canada, winning a silver medal with a lift of 322.5 kg. Edmond finally competed at the 1982 Brisbane Commonwealth Games and again finished with the silver, with the gold going to fellow Australian Dean Lukin.
