= Norman Doig =

Australian rules footballer, born 1910

Norm Doig

Personal information
- Full name: John Norman Doig
- Born: 24 July 1910; Mount Lawley
- Died: 29 July 2001 (aged 91); Attadale
- Height: 175 cm (5 ft 9 in)
- Weight: 80 kg (176 lb)

Playing career^{1}
Years	Club	Games (Goals)
1932–1938	East Fremantle	123 (3)
1939	Essendon	2 (0)
1940	East Fremantle	15 (1)
- ^{1} Playing statistics correct to the end of 1940.

John Norman Doig (24 July 1910 – 29 July 2001) was an Australian rules footballer who played for East Fremantle in the West Australian National Football League (WANFL) during the 1930s. He also had a brief stint with Essendon in the Victorian Football League (VFL).

Doig was from a famous footballing family, with his first cousins George Doig and Ron Doig, amongst others, playing league football. His brothers Bill and Edgar also represented East Fremantle in the WANFL. He made a total of 138 senior appearances for East Fremantle, with Doig's two games at Essendon coming when he was in Melbourne on war service.
