= James Aitken (footballer) =

Australian rules footballer

Personal information
- Full name: James Tod Aitken
- Born: 23 July 1882; Chatsworth, Victoria
- Died: 8 August 1915 (aged 33); Lone Pine, Gallipoli, Ottoman Turkey
- Original teams: Queenscliff / Melbourne Grammar School

Playing career^{1}
Years	Club	Games (Goals)
1903	Geelong	1 (0)
- ^{1} Playing statistics correct to the end of 1903.

James Tod Aitken (23 July 1882 – 8 August 1915) was an Australian rules footballer who played with Geelong in the Victorian Football League.

== Family ==
The son of David Aitken (1843–1907), and Ellen Louisa Aitken (1844–1918), née Tod, James Tod Aitken was born at "Hopkins Hill", Chatsworth, Victoria (near Hexham, Victoria) on 23 July 1882.

== Education ==
He was educated at Melbourne Grammar School (1895–1899), passing the University Matriculation Examination in 1899. He played cricket with the school's First XI and football with the school's First XVIII from 1897 to 1899.

== Football ==
He played a single game for the Geelong First XVIII in the VFL competition, against St Kilda on 13 June 1903. It seems that he was selected to play against Carlton the following week, but he did not play.

== Military service ==
Employed as a wool clerk with the New Zealand Loan and Mercantile Agency Company, Ltd., he enlisted in the First AIF on 15 March 1915, and served overseas with the 5th Australian Infantry Battalion.

== Death ==
He was killed in action near Lone Pine at Gallipoli, Ottoman Turkey on 8 August 1915.

He was buried at the Shrapnel Valley Commonwealth War Graves Commission Cemetery, near Gallipoli, Turkey.

== See also ==
- List of Victorian Football League players who died on active service
