= Bob Cameron (Australian footballer) =

Australian rules footballer

Personal information
- Full name: Robert Miles Fletcher Cameron
- Born: 3 May 1877; Merino, Victoria
- Died: 12 June 1960 (aged 83); Sandringham, Victoria
- Original team: Ascot Vale

Playing career^{1}
Years	Club	Games (Goals)
1897	Carlton	11 (1)
- ^{1} Playing statistics correct to the end of 1897.

Robert Miles Fletcher Cameron (3 May 1877 – 12 June 1960) was an Australian rules footballer who played with Carlton in the Victorian Football League (VFL). His last game came in the final round of the 1897 season, a 32-point loss to Collingwood.

Following his football career, he graduated from university and set up a medical practice in Boulder, Western Australia. He volunteered for the army during World War I, and was a part of the Gallipoli Campaign. He was promoted to the rank of captain, and returned to Australia after serving in France on the Western Front.
