= Greeks of Melbourne =

Greeks of Melbourne Έλληνες της Μελβούρνης
Total population
- Greeks; 173,598 by ancestry, 45,618 by birth (3.87% of Greater Melbourne's population)

Languages
- Australian English; Greek

Religion
- Predominantly Greek Orthodox

Related ethnic groups
- part of Greek Australians

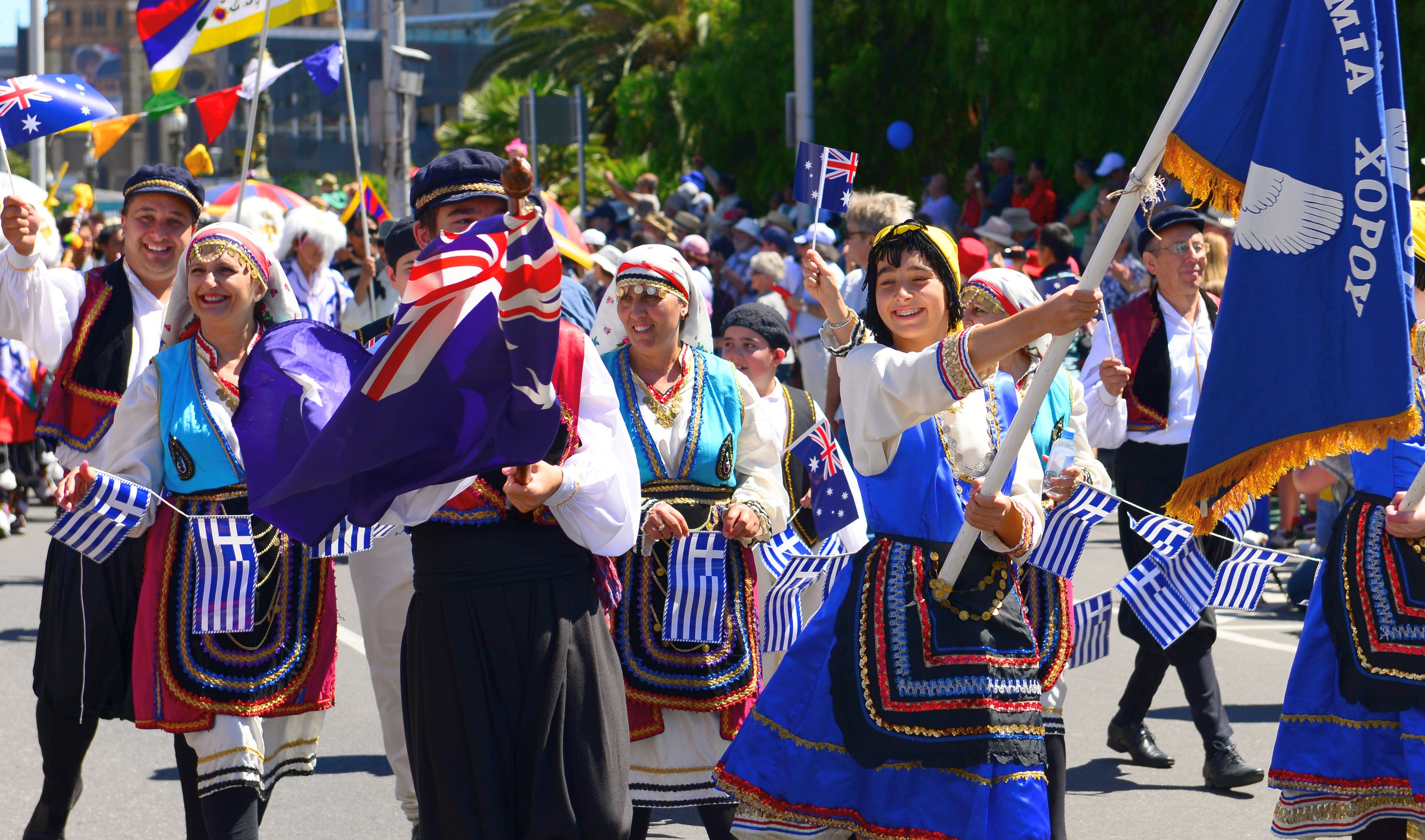
Greek Australians during a parade for Australia Day in Melbourne (2014).

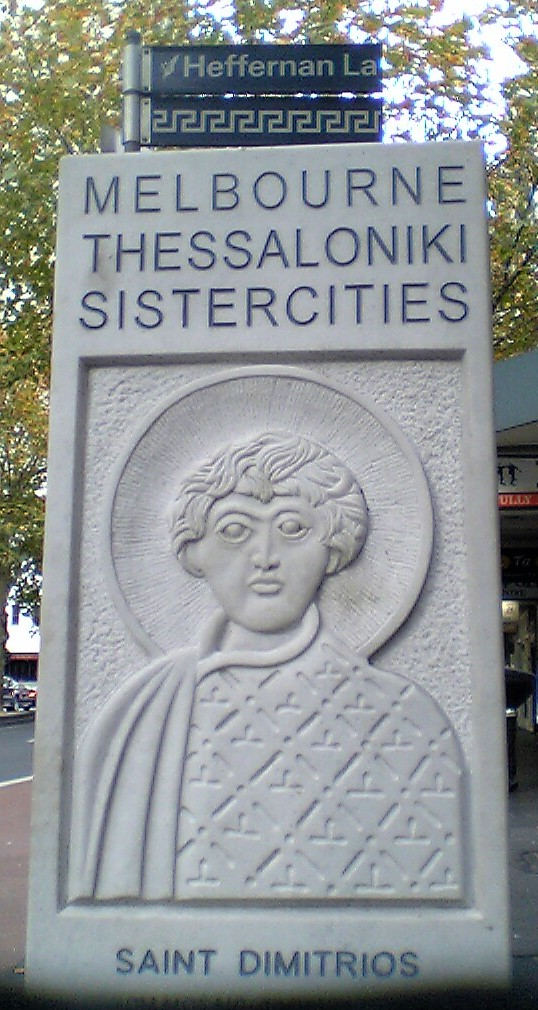
Stele representing the sister cities of Melbourne and Thessaloniki located at Lonsdale Street's Greek Precinct.

Greeks of Melbourne (Greek: Έλληνες της Μελβούρνης) compose one of the largest Greek diaspora communities in the world and Melbourne hosts the largest Greek-speaking population outside of Greece and Cyprus. According to the 2016 Australian census, Melbourne has the largest Greek population in Australia with 173,598 Greeks, making up 3.87% of Greater Melbourne's population. In Greek Australians, the Hellenic identity and values are passed down from one generation to the next. As such, 88% of Greek Australians (regardless of country of birth) speak Greek and 91% are members of the Greek Orthodox Church.

As a result of the extensive historical and cultural ties between the Greek community of Melbourne and their Greek homeland, Melbourne is a sister city to Thessaloniki, Greece's second largest city and one of Europe's most important cultural centres. The Australian Department of Foreign Affairs and Trade estimates that economic activity (including tourism) between Greece and Australia generates more than $800 million annually with an additional $700 million in investment between the two nations annually, totalling $1.5 billion.

Melbourne makes up one of the eight important Greek population centres worldwide. The others are Sydney, Toronto, Montreal, New York City, Chicago, Boston and London. In the 21st century, most Greeks outside of Greece and Cyprus live in one of these eight cities.

== Modern Greek civilisation in Melbourne ==
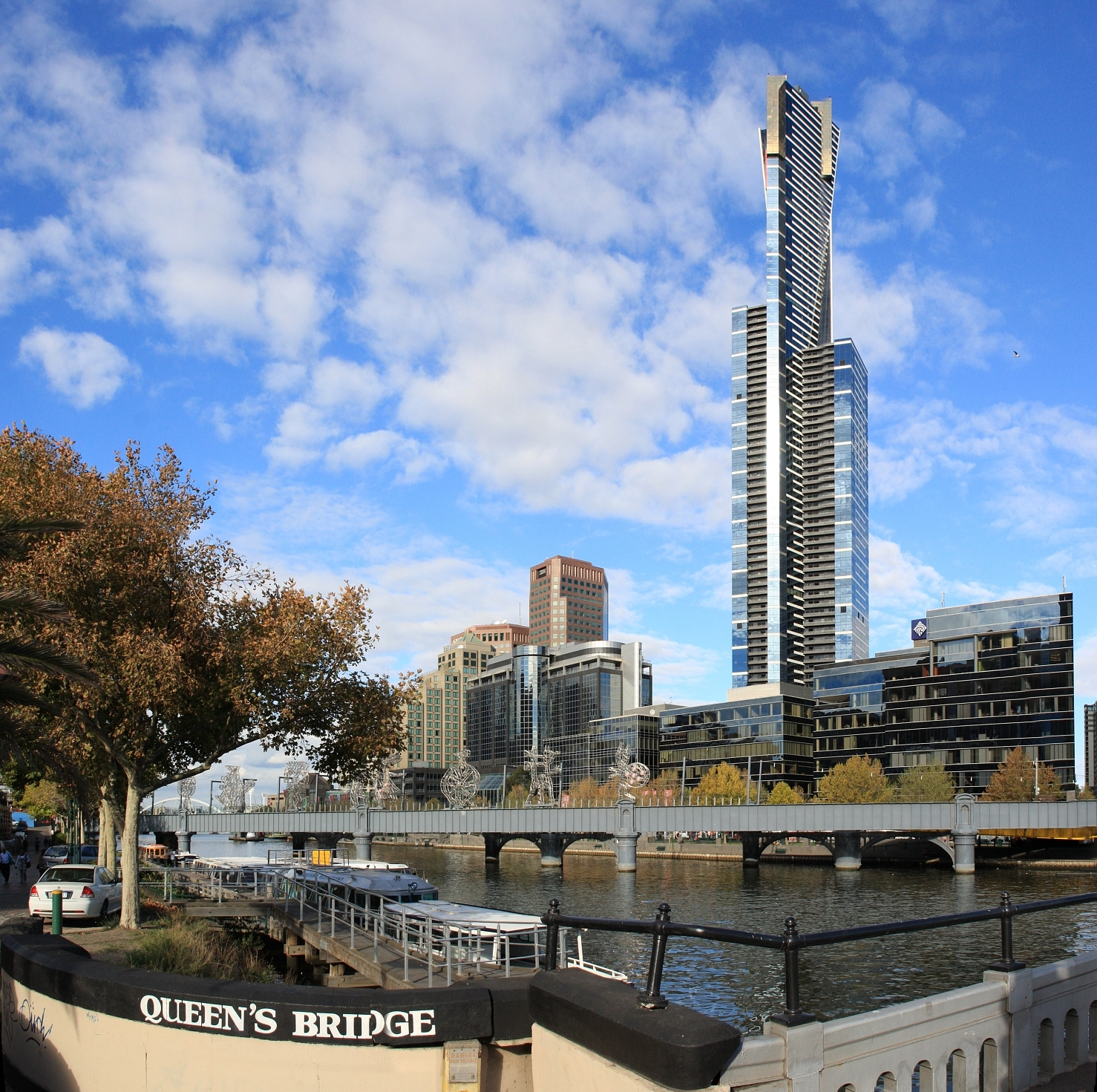
The Eureka Tower, one of Melbourne's most identifiable structures designed by Greek Australian Nonda Katsalidis.

Modern Greek civilisation in Melbourne is perpetuated by three Greek Australian day schools, dozens of after-hours 'Greek schools', a network of aged care and welfare societies, many community and cultural organisations, brotherhoods, youth groups, and sporting clubs. The Neos Kosmos newspaper serves the community. The Hellenic Museum located in Melbourne's CBD tells the ongoing story of the Greeks in Melbourne and houses the Hellenic Foundation for Culture's centre. Furthermore, the World Council of Hellenes Abroad maintains a presence in the city.

Hellenic student organisations are present at all seven universities located in Melbourne and maintain a high participation rate by Greek students. The National Union of Greek Australian Students (NUGAS) is based in Melbourne. Additionally, the American Hellenic Educational Progressive Association, dedicated to Hellenic ideals of education, philanthropy, civic responsibility, family and individual excellence, possesses a chapter in Melbourne.

The Greeks of Melbourne have made a rich contribution to Victorian society through achieving a high level of educational attainment and business ownership. Melbourne's physical landscape has been shaped by Hellenic influence: the Eureka Tower, the tallest building in Melbourne's skyline, was designed by Greek Australian Nonda Katsalidis. Additionally, many of Melbourne's landmarks feature prominent Greek designs including Parliament House, the Shrine of Remembrance and the State Library.

Additionally, the new gallery NGV Contemporary (expected to be completed by 2025) is set to become Melbourne's international iconic landmark. The winning design is that of Greek Australian architect Angelo Candalepas. The experience is focused around the visually arresting ‘omphalos’ (the Greek word for the centre of the earth): a central spherical gallery that soars more than 40 metres upwards through all levels of the building, connecting to a lantern in the sky.

Australia's democratic and multicultural atmosphere has allowed Greek culture and community life to flourish in Melbourne. Over the years, various events have been held in Melbourne to remember the state-sponsored destruction of Greek communities in various parts of the world as a result of the Greek genocide and Greek Operation of the NKVD. In March 2021, Melbourne's Greek community received $200,000 from the Victorian Government to fund events commemorating the 200th anniversary of Greek Independence.

Preservation of Greek culture and community is extremely important to the Greeks. One study investigating the 54 most common ethnic groups in Australia found that Greek Australians had the lowest rate of intermarriage (marrying outside their ethnicity) than every other race in the first, second and third generations. Generally, intermarriage results in a loss of culture in the subsequent generation unless engagement with Greek language and education is introduced early and maintained throughout childhood. As observed among other ethnic groups, children born to mixed marriages are much less likely to marry someone of a similar background and the original culture is completely lost within just two generations. Despite Greek Australians exhibiting the lowest rate of intermarriage in the country, the Greek Orthodox Church in Australia reports that the number of Greeks marrying non-Greek spouses is increasing in recent years. Children born to mixed-marriage Greek families more often than not embrace their Hellenic heritage and the appeal of Greek culture in these instances creates an opportunity for the community to grow in number rather than diminish.

== Culture ==
Year round, there are many cultural, arts and sporting events run by and catering to the Greek Australians in Melbourne.

=== Antipodes Festival ===
Every year, the Greek community of Melbourne holds the Antipodes Festival at Lonsdale Street's Greek Precinct. The Festival features over 90 food, retail and community stalls, as well as free live entertainment, children's rides and attractions. In 2020, the Antipodes Festival attracted more than 100,000 visitors.

=== Greek Film Festival ===
Melbourne began hosting the Greek Film Festival in 1993 which has continued every year since. The Festival offers "a variety of entertaining and informative films from some of the most gifted Greek storytellers in the film industry, with something on offer for everyone" according to Festival Co-Chairs Jim Bossinakis and Leonidas Vlahakis. In 2025, The Greek Film Festival reported attendance of over 7,000 patrons. The Greek Australian Short Film Festival founded in 2010 is also held in Melbourne to showcase local Greek Australian cinema. The festival showcases short films in three categories: International Shorts, Australian Documentary Shorts, and Australian Shorts. Films are judged by a panel of prominent Greek figures in entertainment.

=== Visits from Greek Singers ===
Many singers from Greece and Cyprus travel to Melbourne to perform their own music concerts. Among those who have performed in Melbourne are Michalis Hatzigiannis, Elena Tsagrinou, Eleni Foureira, Melina Aslanidou, Konstantinos Argyros, Greek American Kalomira and Greek British George Michael.

== Sport ==
A variety of sporting events harbour a large Greek following in Melbourne including the Australian Open which brings Stefanos Tsitsipas, Nick Kyrgios, Maria Sakkari, Thanasi Kokkinakis and Michail Pervolarakis among others to Melbourne. During the World Cup, Greek restaurants and taverns tend to run watch-party events with extended outdoor seating and large screens.

As soccer is popular among many Europeans, the Greek community of Melbourne established many soccer clubs in the areas that they reside including Oakleigh Cannons FC, Malvern City FC, Brunswick City SC, Kingston City FC, South Melbourne FC, Northcote City FC, Bentleigh Greens SC, Altona East Phoenix SC, Port Melbourne SC, Western Suburbs SC and Heidelberg United FC. Annually, the teams compete in the Hellenic Cup.

== Religion ==
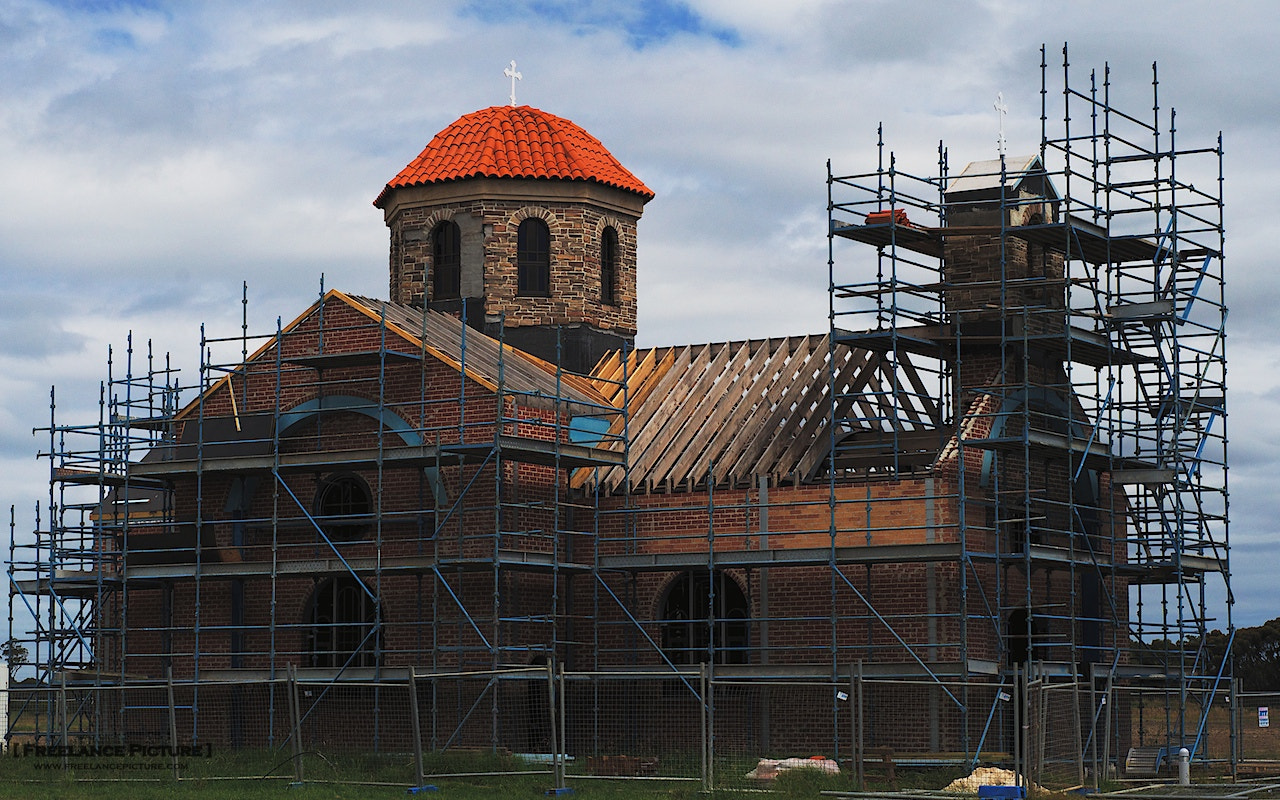
St Lazarus' Greek Orthodox Church in Keysborough under construction in 2011

The Greek Orthodox Archdiocese operates 35 churches and two monasteries in Melbourne. The city's parishes are divided into two districts, Melbourne and Northcote. The church plays a central role in Melbourne's Greek community.

There are another five Old Calendar Greek Orthodox churches and Independent Greek Orthodox churches unaffiliated with the Archdiocese in St Albans and Dromana. Evangelical Greeks worship in North Melbourne, Box Hill, Oakleigh and Richmond. Greek-speaking Jehovah's Witnesses meet in Dingley Village.

== Philanthropy to Greece ==
In response to the Greek government-debt crisis which officially ended in 2018, The Hellenic Initiative (https://www.thehellenicinitiative.org/) was established in 2012 by the Greek diaspora in the United States, United Kingdom, Canada and Australia. The Initiative delivers economic revitalisation and strong leadership to Greece through job creation and education from Greeks in the diaspora. The Hellenic Initiative continues to operate despite the Greek economic crisis having ended with the continued aim of promoting all forms of development, economic or otherwise, to Greece. The global Greek diaspora has been praised for their unity and collaboration in the face of the economic challenges that Greece faced in 2012. The Greek model serves as an example of how a connected diaspora can benefit their cultural homeland.

Bill Papastergiaidis, President of the Greek Community of Melbourne, has been in contact with Nina Paskal, President of the Greek Society "Enotita" in Ukraine in response to the Russian invasion in 2022. The Greek community of Melbourne is making efforts to send medical supplies to the Ukrainian Greeks and provide logistic support for their evacuation to Greece and integration into Greek society as refugees. Almost all of Ukraine's ethnic Greeks, most of whom have resided in Ukraine for many generations, live in areas currently under Russian occupation, specifically the Donetsk Oblast.

== Notable people ==
Greek Melburnians

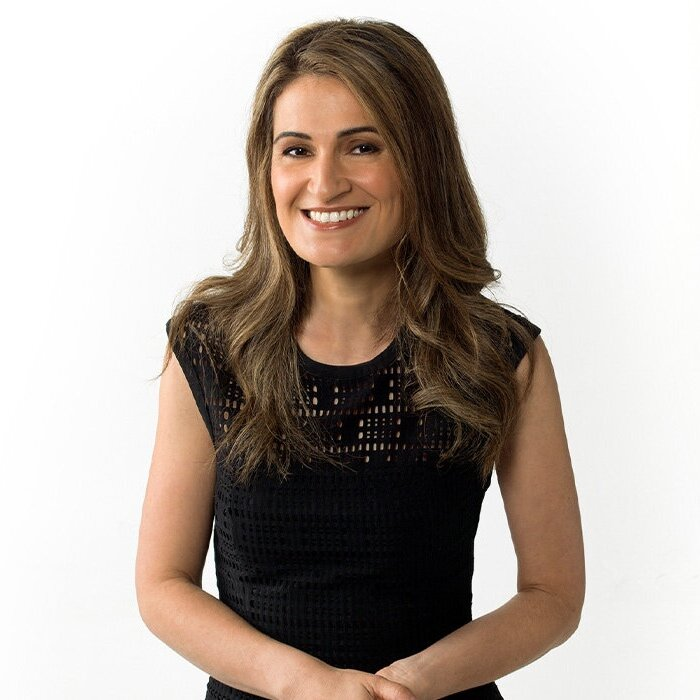
Patricia Karvelas

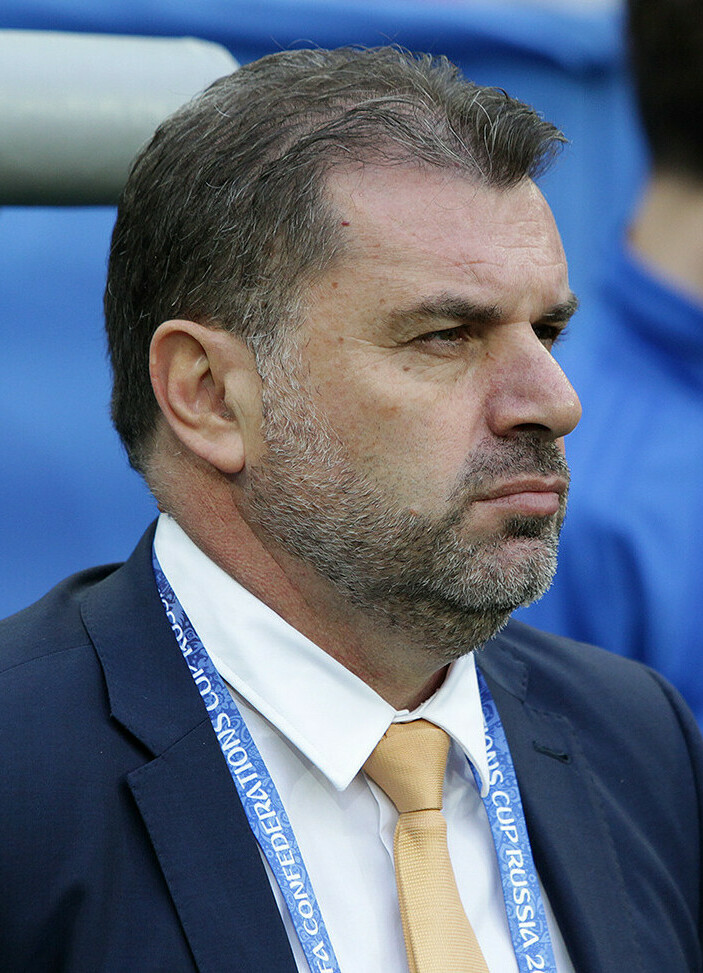
Ange Postecoglou

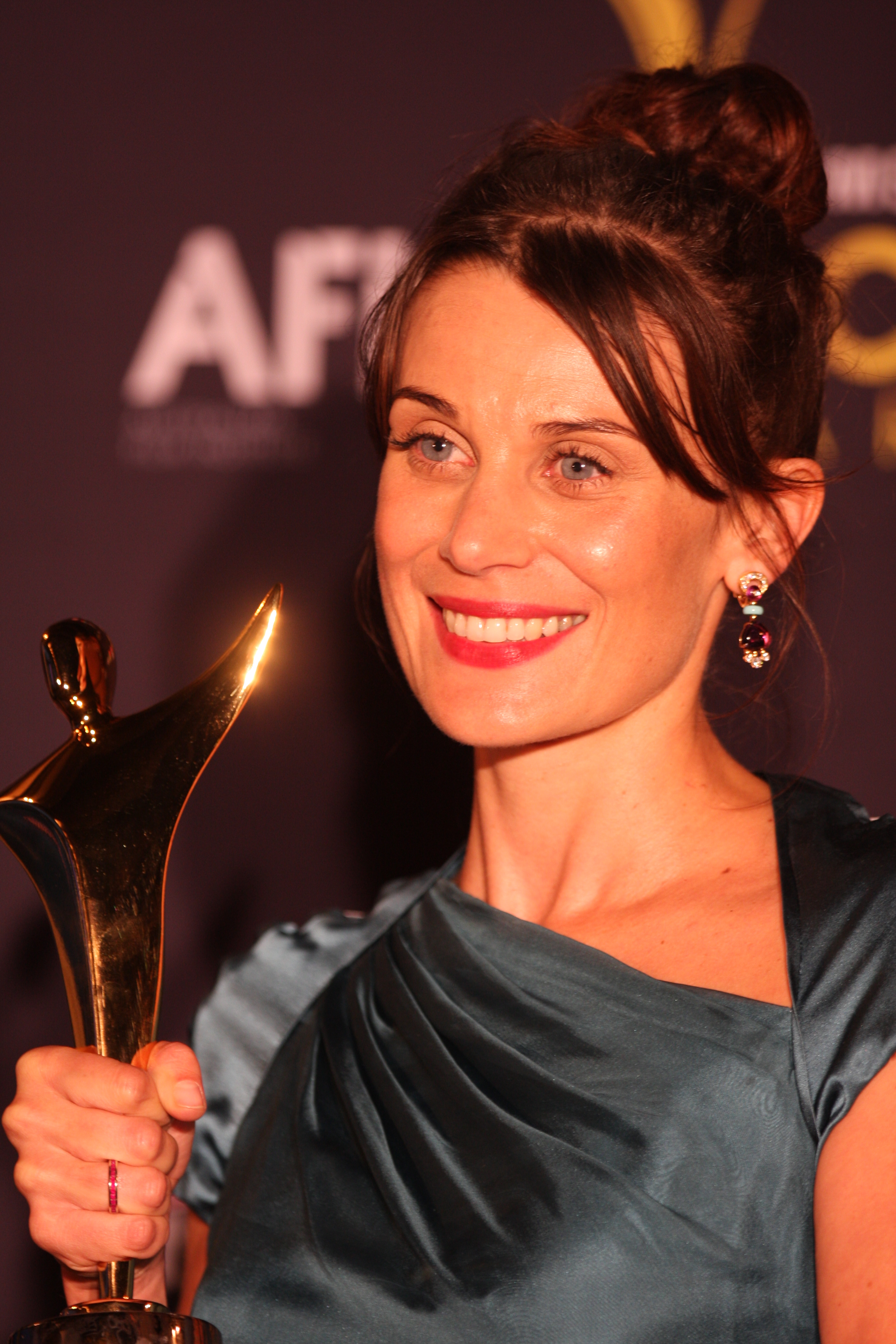
Diana Glenn

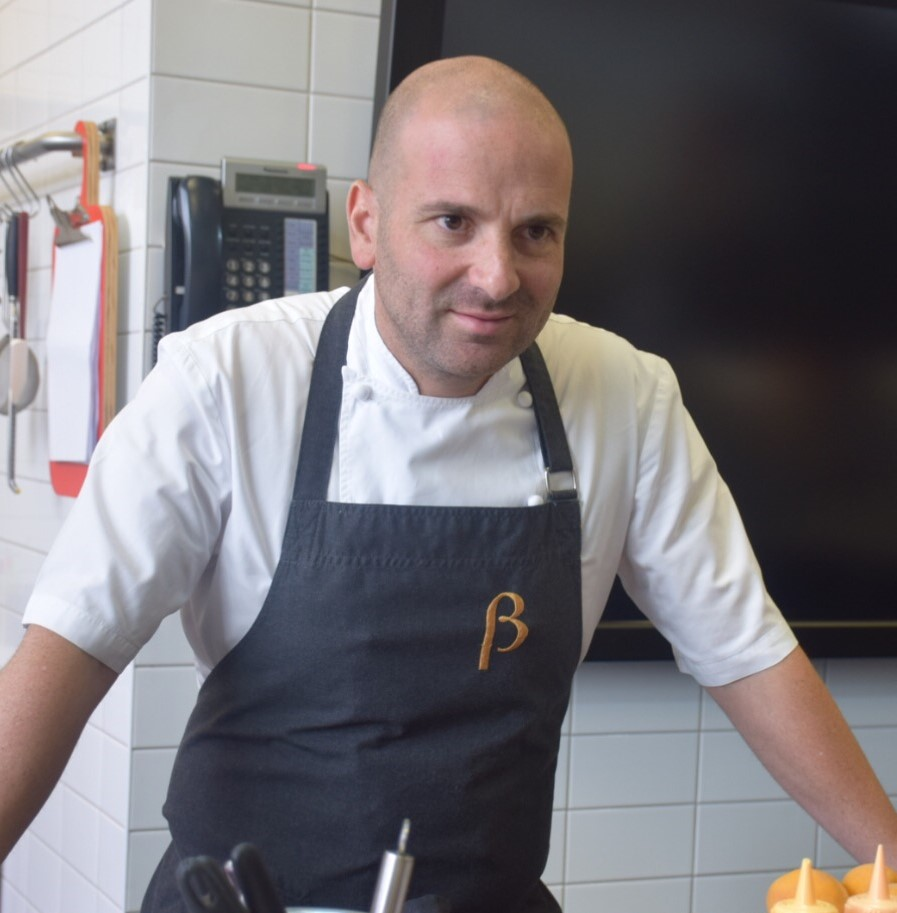
George Calombaris

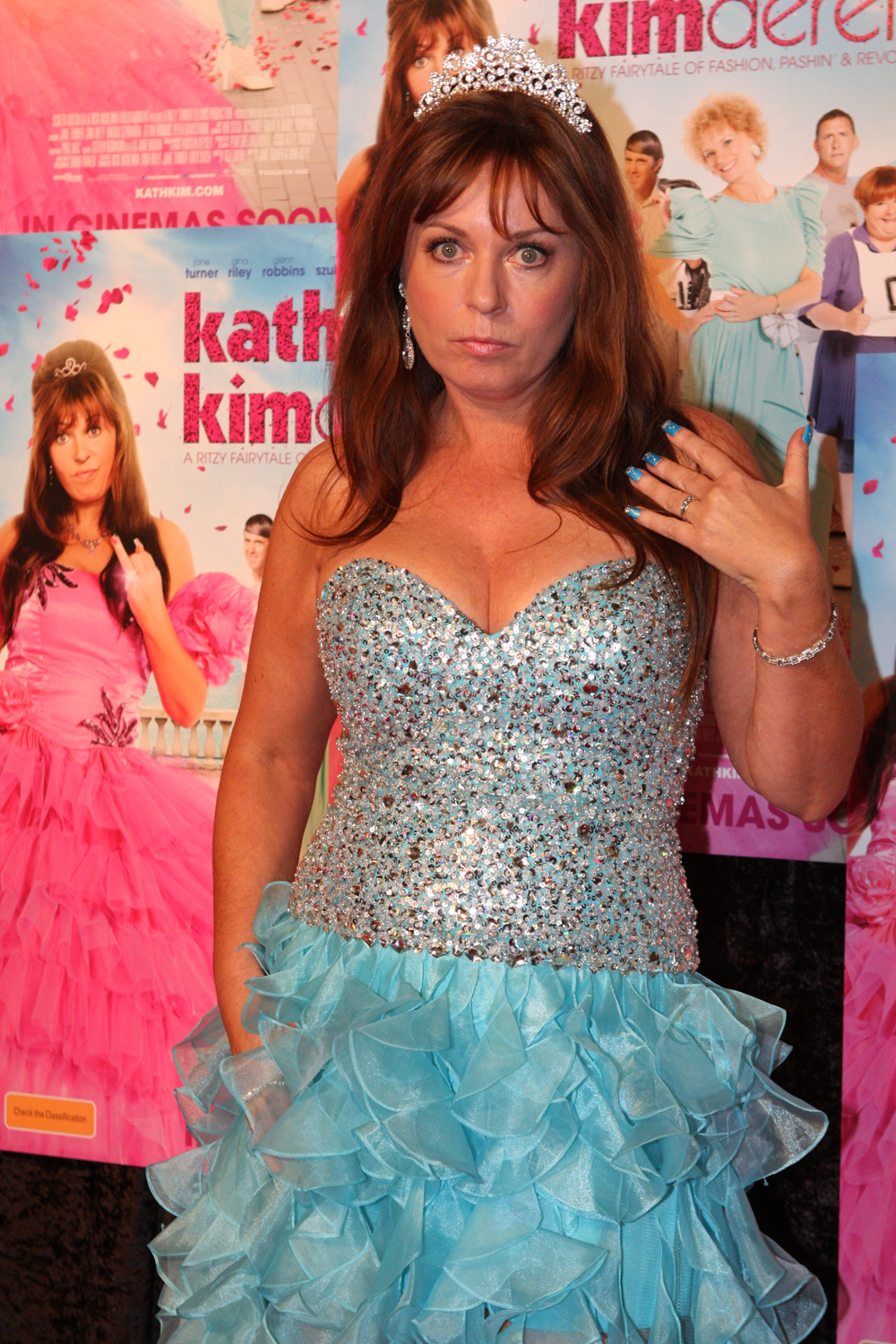
Gina Riley

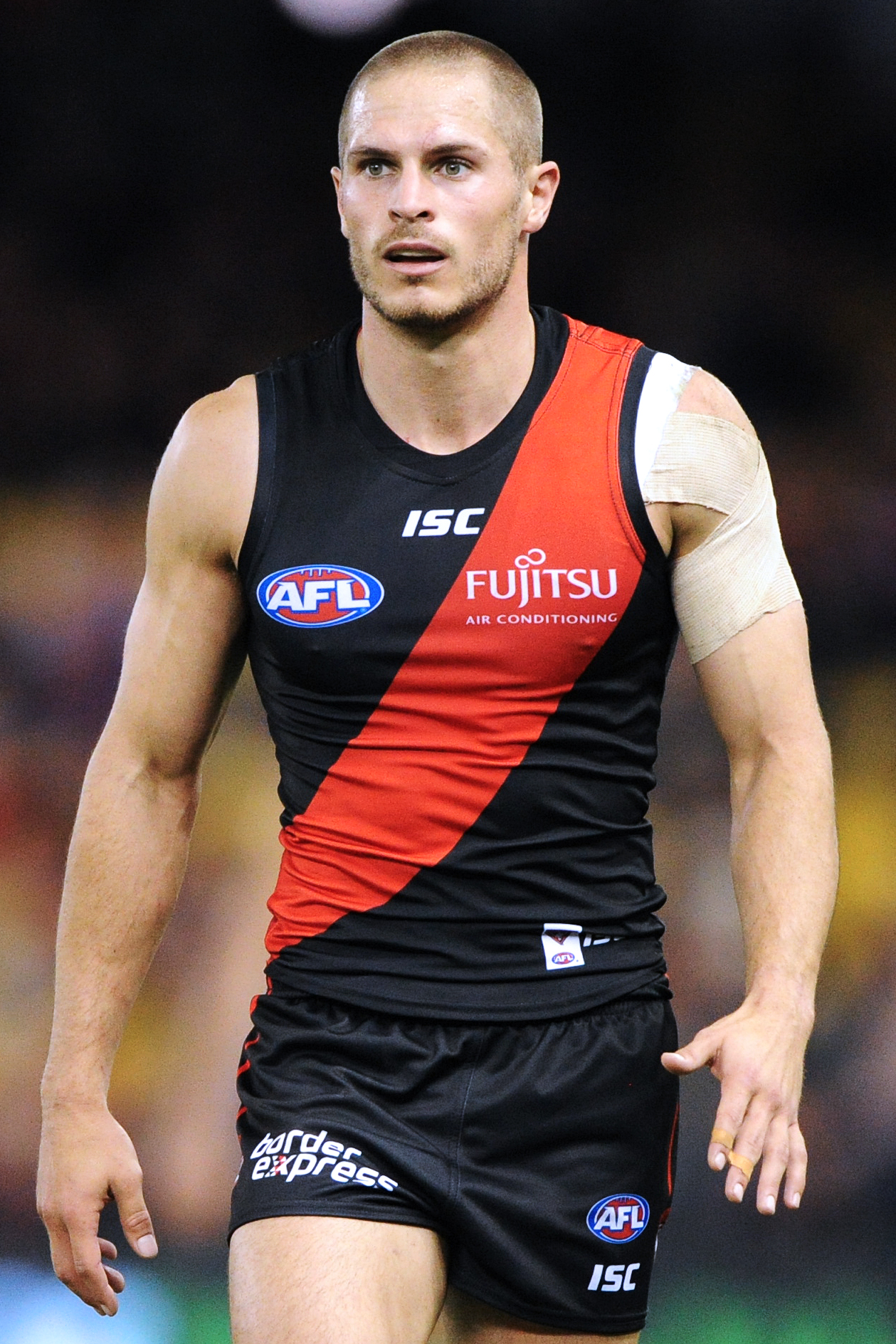
David Zaharakis

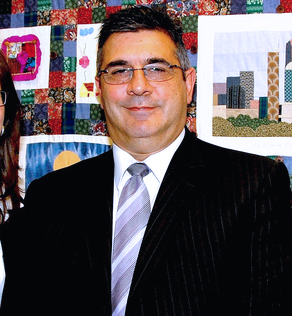
Andrew Demetriou
- John Anastasiadis, former soccer player
- Luke Beveridge, AFL coach
- Nick Birbilis – Professor of Engineering / Executive Dean, Faculty of Science, Engineering and Built Environment Deakin University
- Con Boutsianas, former soccer player
- George Calombaris, chef
- Mary Coustas, comedian
- Andrew Demetriou, former CEO of AFL
- Steve Dimopoulos, Labor politician
- Petro Georgiou, Liberal politician
- Nick Giannopoulos, comedian
- Diana Glenn, actress
- Peter Hatzoglou, cricketer
- Athas Hrysoulakis, former AFL player
- Patricia Karvelas, journalist
- Dean Kalimniou, writer
- Peter Katsambanis, Liberal politician
- Ana Kokkinos, director
- Stan Longinidis, kickboxer
- Steve Kons, Labor politician
- Nicholas Kotsiras, Liberal politician
- Anthony Koutoufides, former AFL player
- Costas Mandylor, actor
- Louis Mandylor, actor
- George Megalogenis, journalist
- Jenny Mikakos, Labor politician
- Harry Nicolaides, writer
- John Pandazopoulos, Labor politician
- Alex Papps, actor
- Tosca Petridis, kickboxer
- Ange Postecoglou, soccer manager and former player
- Gina Riley, actress and comedian
- Nick Staikos, Labor politician
- John Tasioulas, philosopher and legal scholar, first Greek-Australian Rhodes scholar
- Andrew Theophanous, Labor politician
- Kat Theophanous, Labor politician
- Theo Theophanous, Labor politician
- Christos Tsiolkas, author
- Olympia Valance, actress
- Michael Valkanis, former soccer manager and player
- Maria Vamvakinou, Labor politician
- David Zaharakis, AFL player
- Kris Pavlidis, community leader, former Mayor and councillor, president and director of Pronia (Australian Greek welfare) and chairperson of Ethnic Communities Council of Victoria.

== See also ==
- Greek Australians
- Greek Precinct, Melbourne
- Greek diaspora
- Hellenic Cup
- Demographics of Melbourne
