= Demographics of Melbourne =

Demographics of region

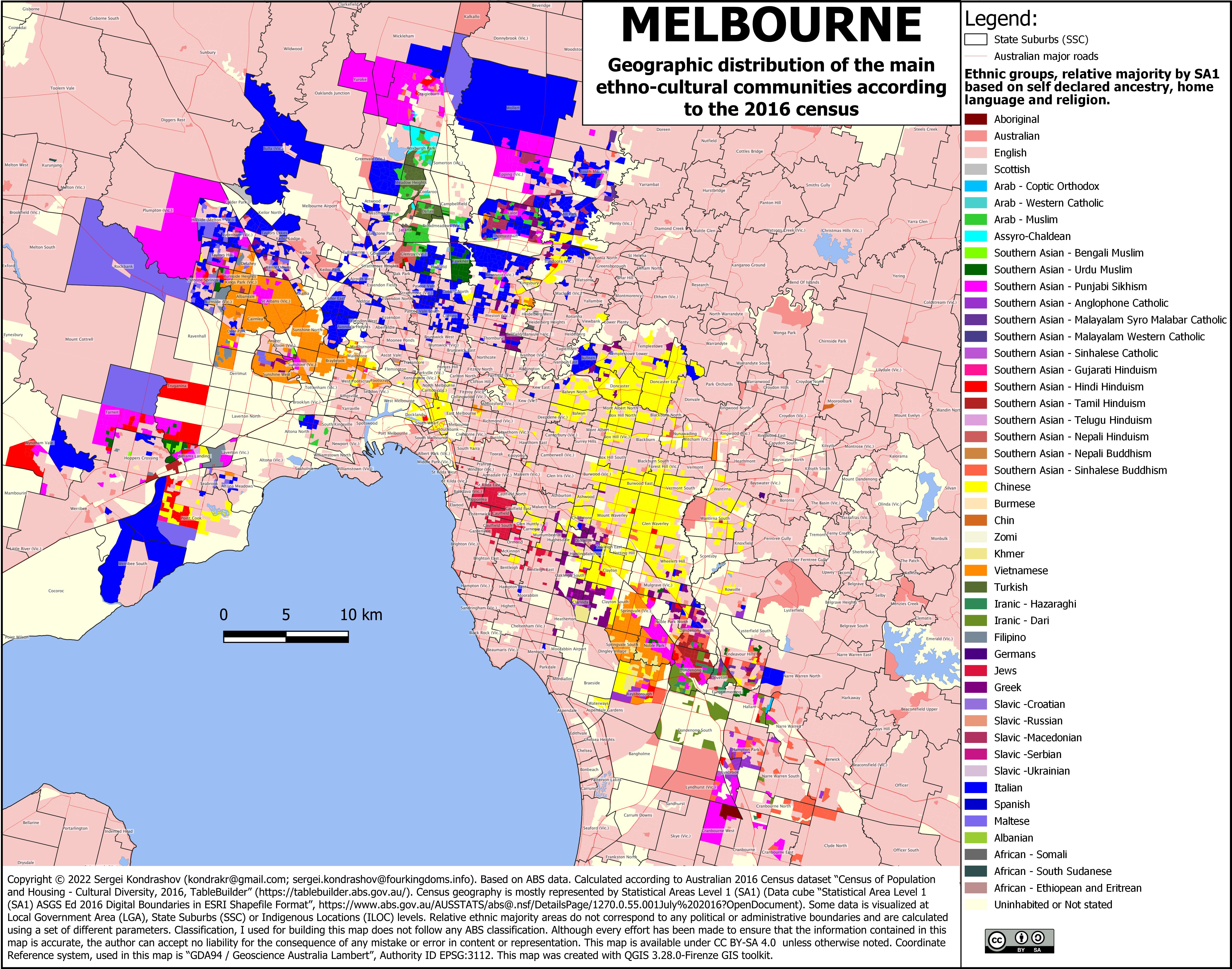
Geographic distribution of the main ethno-cultural communities of Melbourne according to the 2016 census.

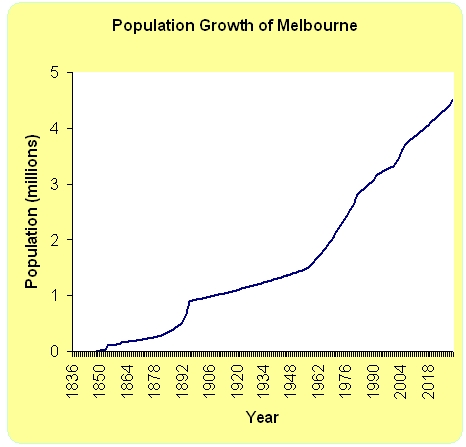
Chart of Melbourne's current and projected population growth

Melbourne is Australia's most populous city and has a diverse and multicultural population.

Melbourne dominated Australia's population growth for the 15th year in a row as of 2017, adding 125,424 people between 2016 and 2017, and boomed past 5 million people in 2019. Population growth is however projected to significantly decline as a result of the COVID-19 pandemic and associated economic slowdown.

Melbourne has the 10th largest immigrant population among world metropolitan areas. In the 2021 census, 58.8% of residents were born in Australia. Melbourne is home to residents from 200 countries and territories, who speak over 233 languages and dialects and follow 116 religious faiths.

The earliest known inhabitants of the broad area that later became known as Melbourne were Indigenous Australians – specifically, at the time of European settlement, the Bunurong, Wurundjeri and Wathaurong tribal groups. Melbourne is still a centre of Aboriginal life — consisting of local groups and indigenous groups from other parts of Australia, as most indigenous Victorians were displaced from their traditional lands during colonization – with the Aboriginal community in the city numbering over 20,000 persons (0.6% of the population).

== Demographic statistics ==
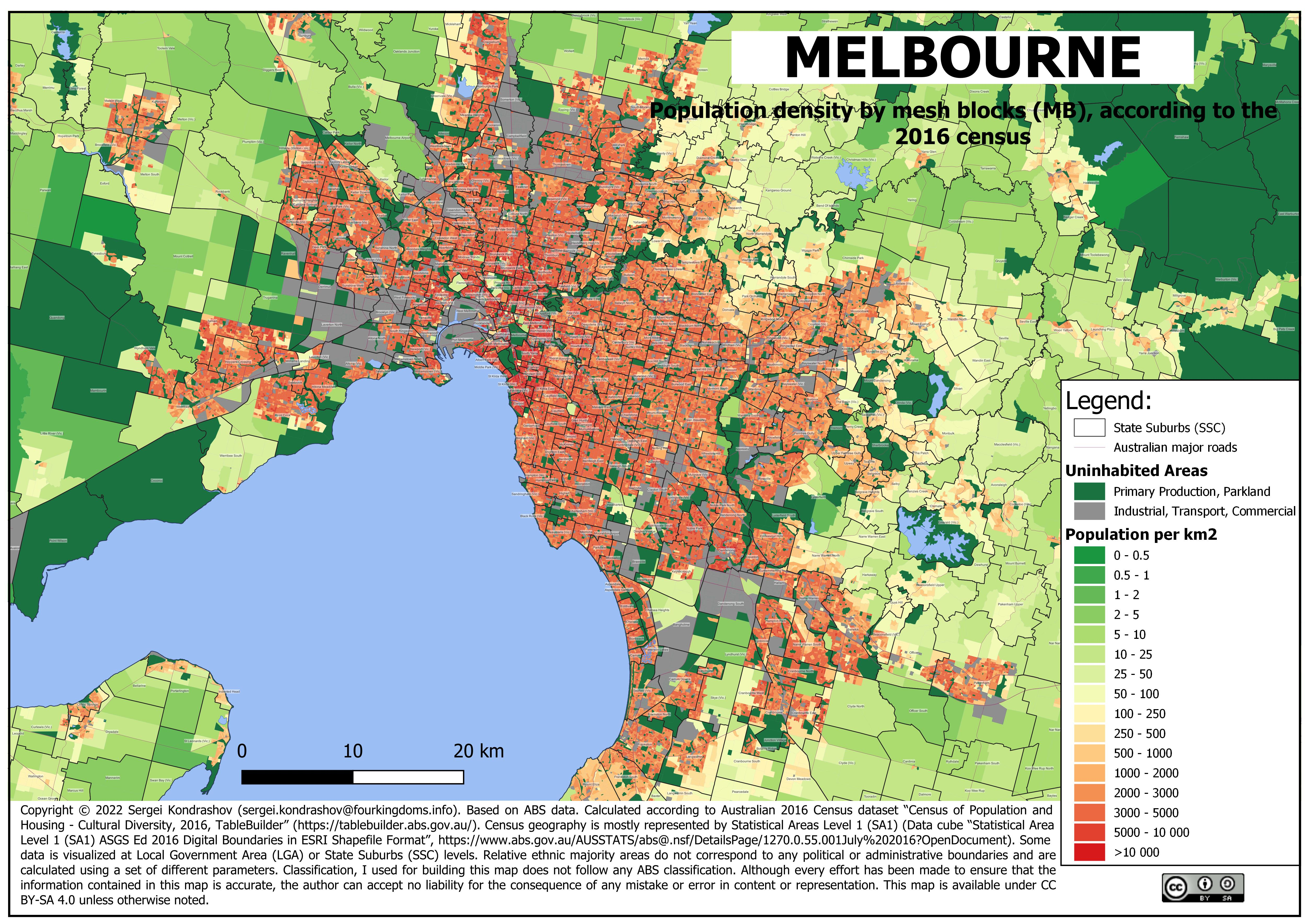
Melbourne population density by mesh blocks (MB), according to the 2016 census

Melbourne population by year
| 1836 | 177 | |
| 1841 | 4,479 | |
| 1854 | 76,565 | Gold rush |
| 1857 | 91,900 | Gold rush |
| 1861 | 126,536 | |
| 1871 | 206,780 | |
| 1881 | 282,947 | 1880s property boom |
| 1891 | 490,896 | |
| 1901 | 496,079 | 1891 economic bust |
| 1911 | 588,854 | |
| 1921 | 766,506 | |
| 1933 | 922,048 | |
| 1947 | 1,226,923 | |
| 1954 | 1,524,062 | |
| 1961 | 1,911,895 | |
| 1971 | 2,436,335 | |
| 1981 | 2,806,000 | |
| 1991 | 3,156,700 | 1990–91 recession |
| 2001 | 3,366,542 | |
| 2006 | 3,744,373 | |
| 2011 | 3,999,982 | |
| 2016 | 4,485,211 | |

Melbourne urban area density (people/ha)
| 1951 | 23.4 |
| 1961 | 21.4 |
| 1971 | 18.1 |
| 1981 | 15.9 |
| 1986 | 16.05 |
| 1991 | 16.8 |
| 1996 | 17.9 |
| 1999 | 17.05 |
| 2001 | 15.9 |

Although Victoria's net interstate migration has fluctuated, the Melbourne statistical division was growing by approximately 50,000 people a year in 2003. Until 2020, Melbourne had attracted the largest proportion of international overseas immigrants (48,000) finding it outpacing Sydney's international migrant intake, along with having strong interstate migration from Sydney and other capitals due to more affordable housing and cost of living, which have been two recent key factors driving Melbourne's growth.

In recent years, Melton, Wyndham, Hume and Whittlesea, part of the Melbourne statistical division, recorded the highest growth rate of all local government areas in Australia.

Melbourne's population density declined following the Second World War, with the private motor car and the lures of space and property ownership causing a suburban sprawl, mainly eastward. After much discussion both at general public and planning levels in the 1980s, the decline has reversed since the recession of the early 1990s.

The city has seen increased density in the inner and western suburbs. Since the 1970s, Victorian Government planning blueprints, such as Postcode 3000 and Melbourne 2030, have aimed to curtail the urban sprawl.

== Demographic history ==
=== European settlement and Gold Rush immigration ===
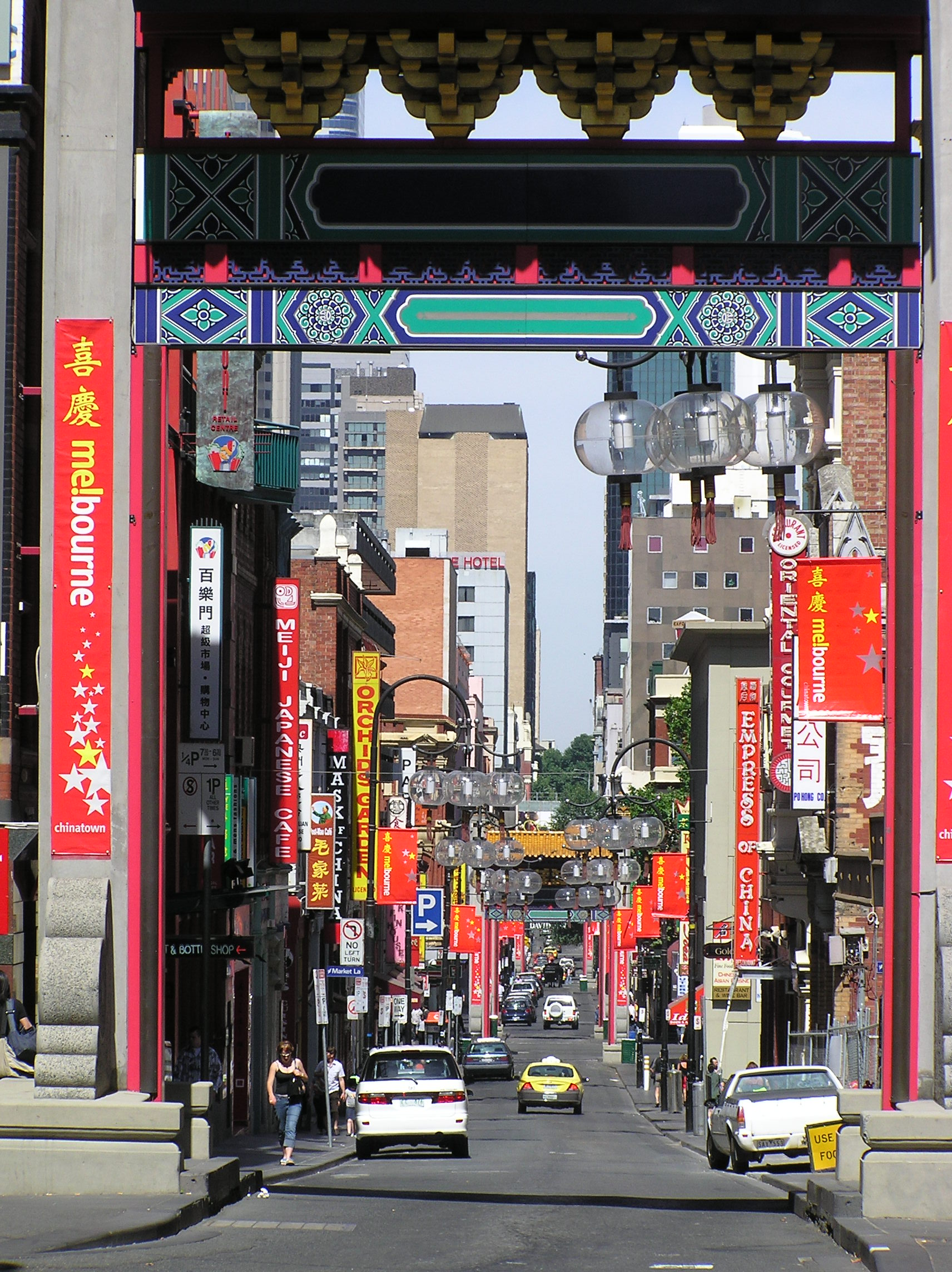
Melbourne's Chinatown, established in 1854, is the oldest in Australia and one of the oldest in the world

The first European settlers in Melbourne were British and Irish. These two groups accounted for nearly all arrivals before the gold rush, and supplied most immigrants to the city until the Second World War.

Melbourne was transformed by the 1850s gold rush; within months of the discovery of gold in August 1852, the city's population had increased by nearly three-quarters, from 25,000 to 40,000 inhabitants. Thereafter, growth was exponential and by 1865, Melbourne had overtaken Sydney as Australia's most populous city.

Many Chinese, German and American nationals were to be found on the goldfields and subsequently in Melbourne. The various nationalities involved in the Eureka Stockade revolt nearby give some indication of the migration flows in the second half of the nineteenth century.

=== Post-war immigration ===
In the aftermath of the Second World War, Melbourne experienced unprecedented inflows from Mediterranean Europe and the Balkans, primarily Greece, Italy, Yugoslavia, and West Asia, mostly from Lebanon, Cyprus and Turkey. Since the end of the White Australia policy in 1973 during the Vietnam War, the city has received a larger wave of primarily Asian immigration and refugees, with Vietnam, China, India.

In 1971, 37.6% of Melbourne were either the children of immigrants (10.1%) or immigrants themselves (27.5%).

== Multiculturalism ==
In 2018, the population of the Melbourne metropolitan area was 4,963,349.

Although Victoria's net interstate migration has fluctuated, the population of the Melbourne statistical division has grown by about 70,000 people a year since 2005. Until 2020, Melbourne had attracted the largest proportion of international overseas immigrants (48,000) finding it outpacing Sydney's international migrant intake on percentage, along with having strong interstate migration from Sydney and other capitals due to more affordable housing and cost of living.

In recent years, Melton, Wyndham and Casey, part of the Melbourne statistical division, recorded the highest growth rate of all local government areas in Australia.

After a trend of declining population density since World War II, the city has seen increased density in the inner and western suburbs, aided in part by Victorian Government planning, such as Postcode 3000 and Melbourne 2030, which have aimed to curtail urban sprawl. As of 2018, the CBD is the most densely populated area in Australia with more than 19,000 residents per square kilometre, and the inner city suburbs of Carlton, South Yarra, Fitzroy and Collingwood make up Victoria's top five.

=== Ancestry and immigration ===
Country of Birth (2021)
| Birthplace (Note: In accordance with the Australian Bureau of Statistics source, England, Scotland, Mainland China and the Special Administrative Regions of Hong Kong and Macau are listed separately.) | Population |
|---|---|
| Australia | 2,947,136 |
| India | 242,635 |
| Mainland China | 166,023 |
| England | 132,912 |
| Vietnam | 90,552 |
| New Zealand | 82,939 |
| Sri Lanka | 65,152 |
| Philippines | 58,935 |
| Italy | 58,081 |
| Malaysia | 57,345 |
| Greece | 44,956 |
| Pakistan | 29,067 |
| South Africa | 27,056 |
| Iraq | 25,041 |
| Hong Kong SAR | 24,428 |
| Afghanistan | 23,525 |
| Iran | 20,922 |
| US | 20,231 |

At the 2021 census, the most commonly nominated ancestries were: (Note: As a percentage of 4,652,326 persons who nominated their ancestry at the 2021 census.)

- English (24.8%)
- Australian (22.5%) (Note: The Australian Bureau of Statistics has stated that most who nominate "Australian" as their ancestry are part of the Anglo-Celtic group.)
- Chinese (8.8%)
- Irish (8.2%)
- Scottish (6.9%)
- Italian (6.7%)
- Indian (5.5%)
- Greek (3.6%)
- German (2.8%)
- Vietnamese (2.5%)
- Filipino (1.7%)
- Dutch (1.4%)
- Maltese (1.3%)
- Polish (1.1%)
- Sri Lankan (1%)
- Lebanese (1%)

0.5% of the population, or 24,062 people, identified as Indigenous Australians (Aboriginal Australians and Torres Strait Islanders) in 2016. (Note: Of any ancestry. Includes those identifying as Aboriginal Australians or Torres Strait Islanders. Indigenous identification is separate to the ancestry question on the Australian Census and persons identifying as Aboriginal or Torres Strait Islander may identify any ancestry.)

Melbourne has the 10th largest immigrant population among world metropolitan areas. In Melbourne at the 2021 census, the other most common countries of birth were India (5.1%), Mainland China (3.6%), England (2.7%), Vietnam (2.0%) and New Zealand (1.7%).

=== Language used at home ===
The following figures come from the 2021 census for Greater Melbourne.

Language used at home (Greater Melbourne)
| Identified languages with 10,000+ speakers | Population | % |
|---|---|---|
| English | 3,003,007 | 61.1 |
| Mandarin | 212,680 | 4.3 |
| Vietnamese | 115,314 | 2.3 |
| Greek | 103,658 | 2.1 |
| Punjabi | 97,684 | 2.0 |
| Arabic | 87,689 | 1.8 |
| Italian | 83,637 | 1.7 |
| Cantonese | 80,584 | 1.6 |
| Hindi | 64,259 | 1.3 |
| Sinhalese | 47,504 | 1.0 |
| Filipino/Tagalog | 46,168 | 0.9 |
| Spanish | 40,412 | 0.8 |
| Urdu | 36,329 | 0.7 |
| Turkish | 33,290 | 0.7 |
| Tamil | 32,725 | 0.7 |
| Macedonian | 27,792 | 0.6 |
| Telugu | 23,432 | 0.5 |
| Gujarati | 23,057 | 0.5 |
| Malayalam | 21,742 | 0.4 |
| Persian | 21,497 | 0.4 |
| Assyrian/Chaldean Neo-Aramaic | 21,113 | 0.4 |
| Nepali | 20,142 | 0.4 |
| Hazaragi | 17,578 | 0.4 |
| Russian | 17,378 | 0.4 |
| Khmer | 17,041 | 0.3 |
| Indonesian | 16,841 | 0.3 |
| French | 16,607 | 0.3 |
| Serbian | 16,445 | 0.3 |
| Croatian | 16,379 | 0.3 |
| Korean | 16,139 | 0.3 |
| Bengali | 14,379 | 0.3 |
| German | 13,380 | 0.3 |
| Maltese | 12,952 | 0.3 |
| Polish | 12,590 | 0.3 |
| Samoan | 12,558 | 0.3 |
| Thai | 12,504 | 0.3 |
| Dari | 11,493 | 0.2 |
| Japanese | 11,233 | 0.2 |

An Indian restaurant in West Melbourne.

Most foreign ethnic groups are associated with the suburbs they are most concentrated in:

- Italians with Avondale Heights, Reservoir, Fawkner, Thomastown, Keilor Park, Greenvale, Pascoe Vale, Bulleen, Mill Park, Keilor East and throughout much of the North and North-Western suburbs
- Greeks with Oakleigh, Oakleigh South, Bentleigh East, Hughesdale, Doncaster, Preston, Thornbury, Pascoe Vale South, Burwood East, Templestowe and interspersed throughout the North, North-Eastern and South-Eastern suburbs.
- Turkish with Broadmeadows, Dallas, Roxburgh Park, Craigieburn, Meadow Heights, Greenvale and Coolaroo
- Lebanese with Broadmeadows, Roxburgh Park, Altona North, Coolaroo, Glenroy, Coburg, Campbellfield and Fawkner
- Egyptians with Hillside, Taylors Lakes and Taylors Hill
- Afghans with Dandenong, Hallam, Doveton, Narre Warren South and Hampton Park
- Iranians with Doncaster, Doncaster East and Templestowe
- Assyrians and Iraqis with Broadmeadows, Roxburgh Park, Greenvale, Craigieburn and Coolaroo
- Vietnamese with St Albans, Springvale, Footscray, Sunshine North, Deer Park, Delahey, Braybrook, Cairnlea, Sunshine, Sunshine West, Noble Park and Richmond.
- Sri Lankans with Dandenong, Endeavour Hills, Noble Park, Hampton Park, Narre Warren, Mount Waverley, Glen Waverley, Clyde North and Craigieburn
- Chileans and Salvadorans with Caroline Springs, Hillside, Burnside Heights, Sunshine West and St Albans
- Colombians with CBD and Southbank
- Somalis with Heidelberg West, Bellfield, Broadmeadows, Carlton, Flemington and North Melbourne
- Ethiopians with Burnside, Tarneit, Truganina, Derrimut, Flemington and throughout the Western Suburbs.
- Eritreans with Braybrook, Flemington, Carlton and Roxburgh Park.
- Sudanese with St Albans, Sunshine, Wyndham Vale, Tarneit, Truganina, Noble Park, Dandenong, Melton, Pakenham and Doveton
- Croatians with St Albans, Taylors Lakes and Avondale Heights
- Serbians with Doveton, Noble Park North, Dandenong North, Endeavour Hills and St Albans
- Macedonians with Thomastown, Lalor, Kings Park, Epping, Mill Park, Taylors Hill, Keilor Downs and Taylors Lakes
- Bosnians with Cairnlea, Noble Park and St Albans
- Albanians with Dandenong
- Maltese with Hillside, St Albans, Caroline Springs, Taylors Lakes and throughout the western suburbs.
- Indians with Tarneit, Truganina, Noble Park, Epping, Cranbourne West, Glen Waverley, Laverton, Sydenham, Springvale, Hampton Park, Clayton South, Lynbrook, Lyndhurst, Point Cook, Carnegie, Glenhuntly, Clayton, Dandenong, Craigieburn and St Albans
- Pakistani with Fawkner, Glenroy, Broadmeadows, Tarneit and Dallas
- Chinese including Chinese Malaysians, Hongkongers, Taiwanese with CBD, Templestowe, Doncaster East, Doncaster, Clayton, Carlton, Mount Waverley, Glen Waverley, Wantirna South, Springvale, Vermont South, Forest Hill, Bundoora, Point Cook, Box Hill and throughout the Eastern suburbs
- Jewish with Caulfield North, Elsternwick, Caulfield, St Kilda East, Balaclava
- Russian with Carnegie, Bentleigh East, Caulfield, Caulfield North, Bentleigh, McKinnon and Moorabbin
- Samoans with Tarneit, Hampton Park, Cranbourne, Craigieburn, Melton, Broadmeadows and St Albans
- Māori with Tarneit, Truganina, Point Cook, Cranbourne, Hampton Park and Carrum Downs
- Filipino with Caroline Springs, Hampton Park, Derrimut, Burnside, Tarneit and Hoppers Crossing
- Koreans with CBD, Box Hill, Glen Waverley, Clayton, Oakleigh, Point Cook, Docklands and Southbank
- Cambodian with Springvale, Springvale South, Noble Park, Keysborough and Clayton South
- Nepalese with Glenroy, Broadmeadows and Sunshine.
- Burmese with Sunshine, Laverton, Hoppers Crossing, Werribee, Springvale and Ringwood
- Polish with Bentleigh, Caulfield, Keysborough, Carnegie and Albion
- Timorese with Delahey and Taylors Hill
- Fijian with Berwick, Cranbourne and Hampton Park

The cities of Whittlesea, Wyndham, Hume, Brimbank and Dandenong on Melbourne's fringe are particular current migrant hotspots.

=== Demographics and cuisine ===
As a result of large migrant populations, Melbourne has a proliferation of areas where restaurants, cafes and services of similar international demographic establish, particularly Chinese, Indian, Thai, Vietnamese and Malaysian cuisines. Some of these areas include:

- Lonsdale Street, Top End, Melbourne CBD – Greek cuisine
- Lygon Street, Southern End, Carlton – Italian cuisine (Little Italy)
- Sydney Road, Coburg/Brunswick – Lebanese and Turkish (Little Lebanon)
- Johnston Street, western end, Fitzroy – Spanish/Latin-American
- Caulfield & North Caulfield – Kosher Jewish cuisine
- Oakleigh – Greek cuisine
- Little Bourke Street, eastern end, Melbourne city – Chinese and East Asian cuisine (Chinatown)
- Central Box Hill – Chinese and East Asian cuisine
- Koornang Road, Carnegie – Korean cuisine
- Central Footscray – Vietnamese, Sudanese and Chinese
- Robinson, Walker and Foster streets, Dandenong – Indian (Little India)
- Thomas Street, Dandenong – Afghan (Afghan Bazaar)
- Central Springvale – Chinese, Thai, Vietnamese, Cambodian
- Glen Waverley/Doncaster – Chinese, Malaysian and Sri Lankan cuisines
- Victoria Street, Abbotsford/Richmond – Chinese, Vietnamese (Little Saigon)
- Areas notable for large variety of mixed cuisine – Dandenong, St Kilda, Ormond, Brunswick, Melbourne CBD

== Religion ==
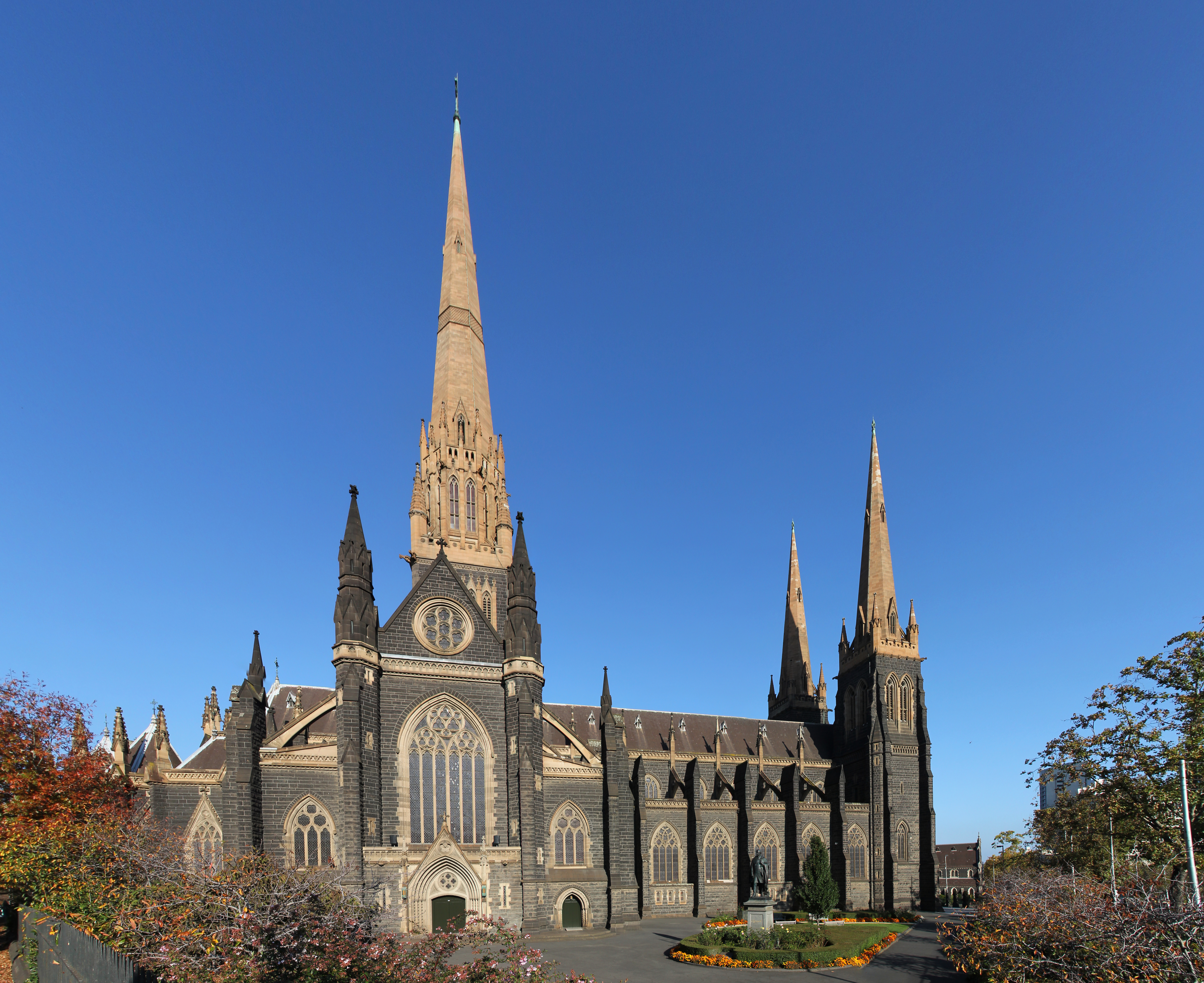
St Patrick's Cathedral, Melbourne (foundation stone laid in 1858)

The 2006 census records show some 28.3% (1,018,113) of Melbourne residents list their religious affiliation as Catholic. The next highest responses were no religion (20.0%, 717,717), Anglican (12.1%, 433,546), Eastern Orthodox (5.9%, 212,887) and the Uniting Church (4.0%, 143,552). Buddhists, Muslims, Jews and Hindus collectively account for 7.5% of the population.

=== Buddhism ===
In 1848, the first large group of Buddhists to come to Australia came as part of gold rush. The great majority stayed briefly for prospecting purposes rather than as permanent settlers. In 1856, a temple was established in South Melbourne by the Sze Yap group. The first specific Australian Buddhist group, the Buddhist Study Group Melbourne, was formed in Melbourne in 1938 but ended a short time later during the Second World War.

=== Christianity ===
The largest religious group is Christianity. 64% of people from Melbourne consider themselves Christians but this is subdivided into a number of denominations of which over half are members of the Roman Catholic Church, followed by the Anglican, Eastern Orthodox and the Uniting churches. The city has two large cathedrals, St Patrick's (Roman Catholic), and St Paul's (Anglican). Both were built in the Victorian era and are of considerable heritage significance as major landmarks of the city.

=== Hinduism ===
The majority of Australian Hindus live along the Eastern Coast of Australia and are mainly located in Melbourne and Sydney. They have established a number of temples and other spiritual meeting places and celebrate most Hindu festivals.

=== Islam ===
There are approximately 500,000 Muslims living in Australia, of which 100,000 are settled in Melbourne. They are noted for their diversity with heritages from more than 60 countries. The first Muslims to settle permanently in Australia were the cameleers, mainly from Afghanistan from as early as the 1860s.

=== Judaism ===
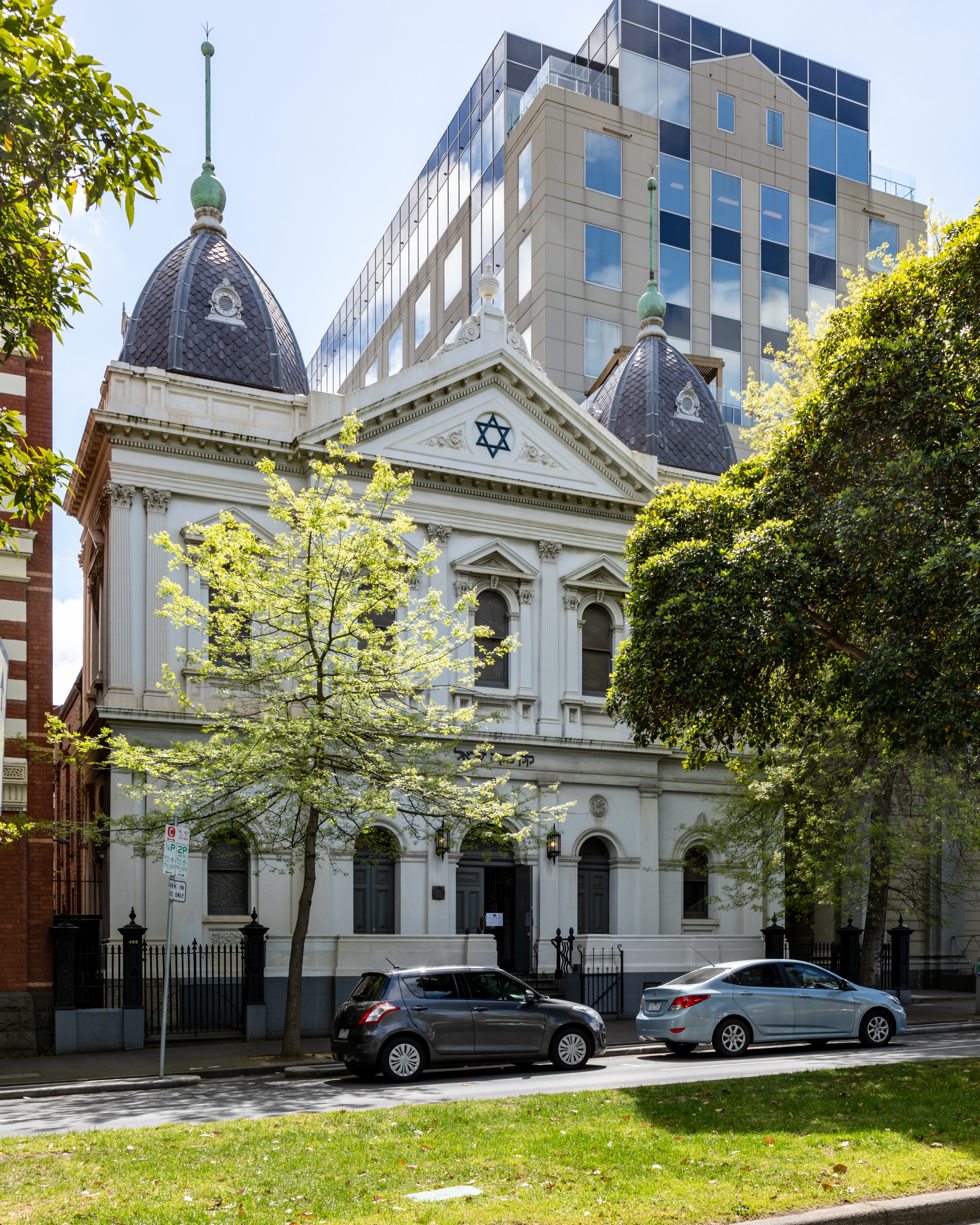
The heritage-listed East Melbourne Hebrew Congregation in East Melbourne.

Four out of ten Australian Jews call Melbourne home. The city is also residence to the largest number of Holocaust survivors of any Australian city, the highest per capita concentration outside Israel. To service the needs of the Jewish community, Melbourne's Jewry have established multiple synagogues, which today number over 30, along with a local Jewish newspaper. Melbourne's largest university–Monash University is named after prominent Jewish general and statesman, John Monash.

=== Sikhism ===
Sikhism is a small but growing minority religion in Australia, that can trace its origins in the nation back to the 1830s. The Sikhs form one of the largest subgroups of Indian Australians with 125,000 adherents according to the 2016 census, having grown from 17,000 in 2001 and 12,000 in 1996[1] [2]. Most adherents can trace their ancestry back to the Punjab region of India. Whereas, as per anecdotal evidence collected by Sikh Council of Australia Inc., there are approximately 100,000 Sikhs in Australia and the number of Punjabi speakers is even higher. They are often mistaken for who they are not, due to Sikh men required to wear a "Turban" as one of the 5 articles of faith. The largest Sikh communities are situated on the Eastern Sea Board, Melbourne, Sydney, Brisbane, followed by Adelaide, Perth, Canberra, Cairns, Townsville. Sikhs also make up a significant population in the town of Woolgoolga near Coffs Harbour, NSW where they own Banana Plantations. There is also a significant Sikh population in Griffith, NSW and Renmark SA, associated with farming. Kahlon Estate's in Renmark which produce Australia's Premium Wines are owned by Sikh emigrants.

=== Irreligion ===
Melbourne, like the rest of Australia, is partially irreligious, with the proportion of people identifying themselves as Christian declining from 96% in 1901 to 64% in 2006 and those who did not state their religion or declared no religion rising from 2% to over 30% over the same period.

Major religious groups in Melbourne (2021)
| Religion | Total population | % of total |
|---|---|---|
| Christianity | 1,974,006 | 40.1% |
| Islam | 258,250 | 5.3% |
| Hinduism | 203,192 | 4.1% |
| Buddhism | 190,454 | 3.9% |
| Sikhism | 85,286 | 1.7% |
| Judaism | 45,698 | 0.9% |
| Non-classifiable religious belief | 27,343 | 0.6% |
| No religion/secular beliefs | 1,827,618 | 37.2% |
| Not stated | 287,048 | 5.8% |
| Total population | 4,917,741 | 100% |

== Socioeconomics ==
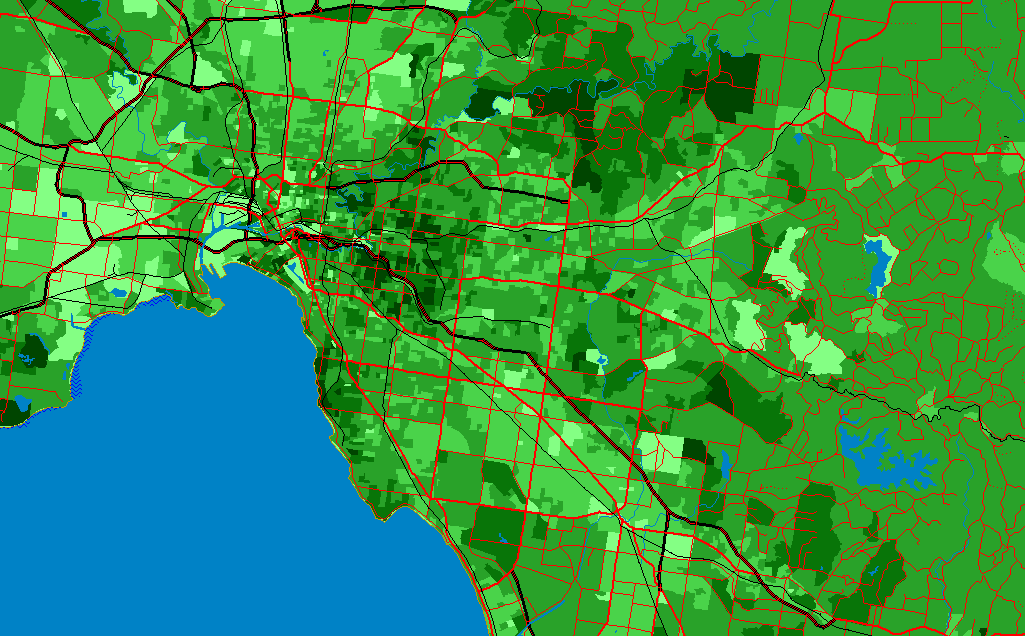
Darker green indicate areas of higher household incomes. Suburbs immediately east of the centre tend to be more affluent

Areas within the Greater Melbourne area host varying groups of socio-economic background, inner city areas tend to be more affluent, gentrified or bohemian, suburban areas tend to house middle class residents, whilst outer suburban areas tend to house lower income residents.

Other points of note include increased property prices in public transport corridors, leading to many of these areas, particularly in the inner east, being more affluent.

== See also ==
- Demographics of Australia
- Greek community of Melbourne
- Italian Australians of Melbourne
- Japanese community of Melbourne
- Birth rate and fertility rate in Australia
- Immigration to Australia
- Melbourne population growth
