= Hellenic Museum =

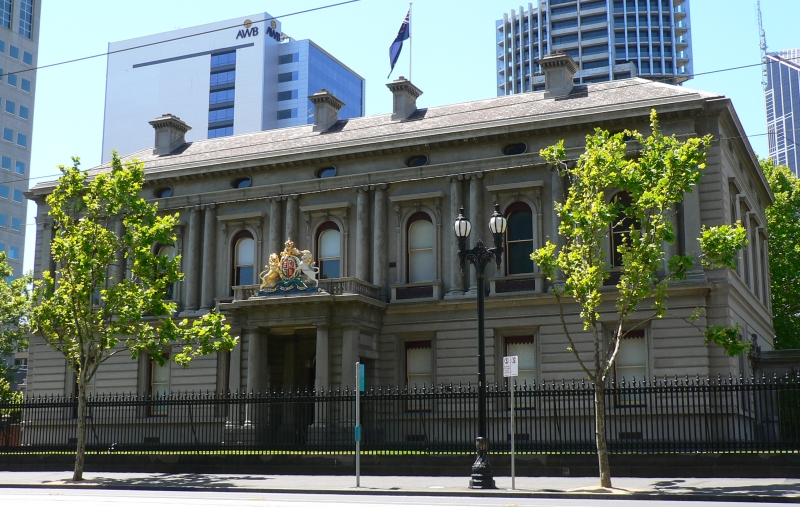
- Established: 2007
- Location: 280 William Street, Melbourne, Victoria, Australia
- Coordinates: 37.8122°S 144.9570°E
- Type: Greek museum
- Curator: Sarah Craig
- Website: www.hellenic.org.au

The Hellenic Museum (Greek: Ελληνικό Μουσείο Μελβούρνης) is an art and history museum in Melbourne, Victoria, Australia promoting Hellenic culture, both ancient and contemporary, through programs, exhibitions and events.

The museum also covers the Greek community of Melbourne and Australia.

== History ==
The museum was founded in 2007 by businessman and philanthropist Spiros Stamoulis and is based in the Melbourne City Centre district at the former Royal Mint building. The Hellenic Museum’s aim is to promote “the celebration, understanding, and preservation of the artistic and cultural heritage of ancient and modern Greece”.

The museum’s current chairman, Harry Stamoulis, has continued his father’s pursuit of cultural partnerships and collaborations through philanthropy in the arts.

== Collections ==
The Hellenic Museum hosts both temporary and permanent exhibitions and collections.

Permanent collections and exhibitions include the photographic installation Oneiroi by Australian photographer Bill Henson, the Mary and Peter Mitrakas Collection of Cypriot Antiquities, a collection of cast ancient Greek statues from the Hellenic Ministry of Culture and the Greek National Archaeological Museum, the Koumountatakis Family collection of pottery from Magna Grecia and Roman marbles, and a range of Byzantine icons.

In 2013, the Hellenic Museum partnered with the Benaki Museum in Greece to house a semi-permanent collection of antiquities in Melbourne, which commenced in 2014.

Exhibitions at the Hellenic Museum generally focus around history, culture, education, the visual arts, film, music and architecture.

== Building ==
The Hellenic Museum is housed in the former Royal Mint, located on the corner of William and Latrobe Streets in the Melbourne City Centre. In 1872 the building opened as a branch of the British Royal Mint; designed by architect J. J. Clark, it provides one of the few examples of the Renaissance Revival style in Australian buildings. The building the Hellenic Museum is located in served as the administrative building for offices alongside the living quarters for the Deputy Master, his family and domestic servants. The administrative building, alongside the gatehouses on either side of it, is the only remaining part of the original Mint complex.

The Melbourne Mint officially closed in 1968, the machinery was sold and the operative departments demolished. The building is actively conserved and heritage listed.

== See also ==
- Greek Precinct, Melbourne
- Melbourne City Centre topics
- Greek community of Melbourne
