= Katerina Kotsonis =

Australian actress

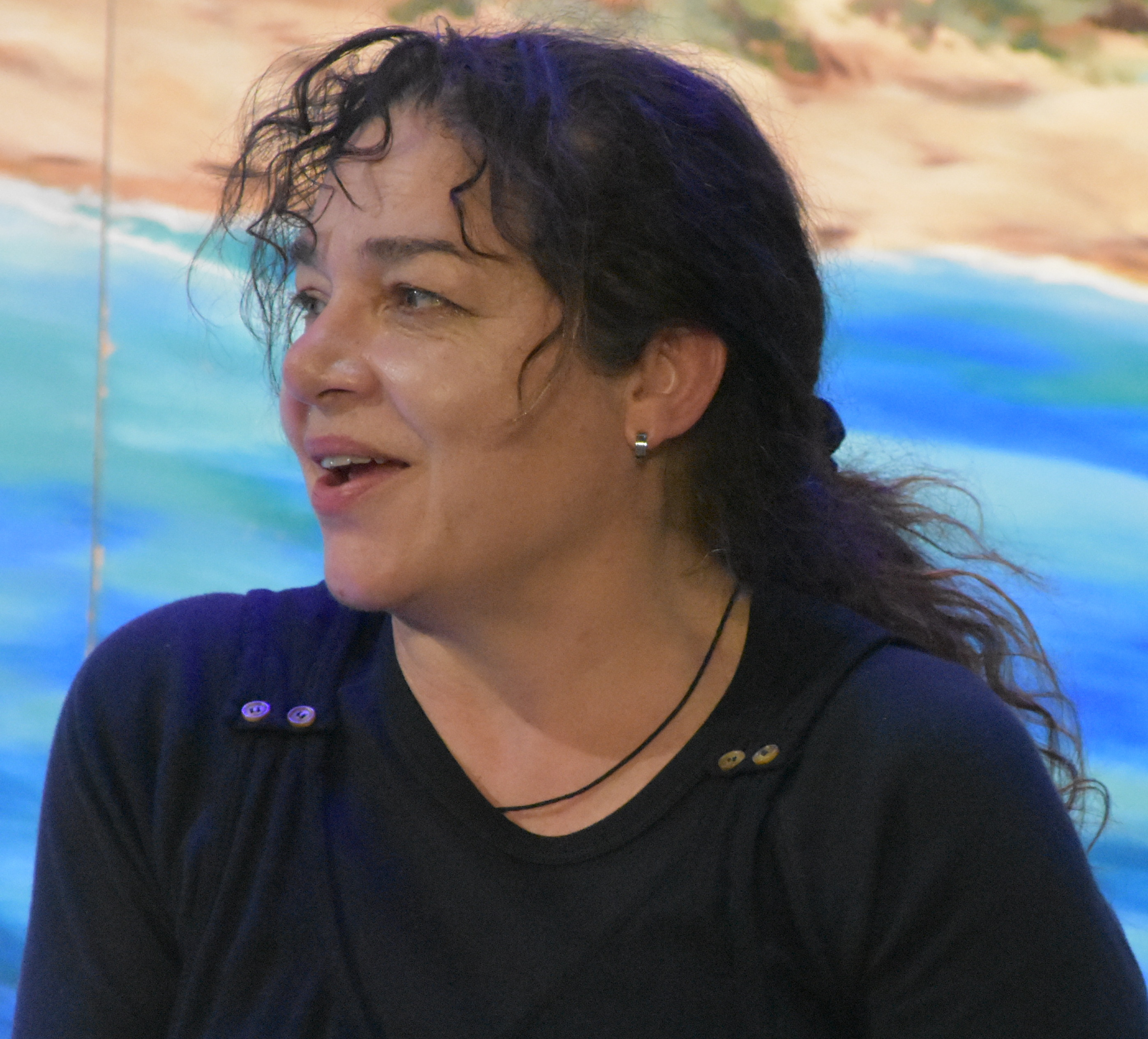
- Kotsonis in 2025
- Born: Katerina Kotsonis; Melbourne, Victoria
- Education: La Trobe University; University of Melbourne
- Occupation: Actress
- Years active: 1988–present
- Known for: Short Cuts; Neighbours; Wentworth

Katerina Kotsonis is an Australian television and stage actress, known for her roles as Mrs Papasavas in Short Cuts and Patricia Pappas in Neighbours.

== Early life ==
Kotsonis was born in Melbourne. She studied at La Trobe University and the University of Melbourne. In her early years, Katerina was part of the renowned performance art group Primary Source.

== Career ==
Kotsonis has appeared in numerous television shows across her career. In 1992, she had a recurring role as Julia in comedy series Acropolis Now, opposite Nick Giannopoulos.

In 2000 same year, Kotsonis made a guest appearance as Sophie Andrikidis in Blue Heelers, a role she briefly reprised in both 2001 and 2002. Also in 2002, Kotsonis played the ongoing role of Mrs Papasavas in children's series Short Cuts.

In 2012, Kotsonis landed a guest role as Patricia Pappas in long-running soap opera Neighbours, resuming the role in a recurring capacity in 2014. The following year, she made her first appearance of several in prison drama Wentworth. She played the guest roles of both Officer Brenda Murphy and Nurse Collins in the series, between 2015 and 2020. In 2016, Kotsonis had a starring role in comedy web series Little Acorns, alongside Rachel Griffiths.

Kotsonis' most recent small screen credit is the 2026 web series Become the One, in which she plays the role of Maria.

Kotsonis has also made guest appearances in The Games, Wildside, The Secret Life of Us, Very Small Business, Bed of Roses, The Ex-PM and miniseries and Seven Types of Ambiguity.

Kotsonis' first film role was as Ariadne in 1998 independent drama Head On, opposite Alex Dimitriades. She later played the role of Angela in 2011 film Surviving Georgia, alongside Pia Miranda and Holly Valance. She has also appeared in numerous short films.

Additionally, Kotsonis has performed on stage in theatre productions including Cruel and Tender and Born Yesterday (both for Melbourne Theatre Company), The White Rose (for Midsumma Festival) and Forty Lounge Café (for La Mama). In 2022, she appeared in the play Security and in 2024 she played the title role in the musical Eftihia, for La Mama.

Together with actor Jim Koutsoukos, Kotsonis founded the Greek Australian Short Film Festival (GASFF) in Melbourne in 2010.

== Filmography ==
=== Television ===
Year	Title	Role	Notes	Ref
1991	Embassy	Rani	1 episode	
1992	Acropolis Now	Julia	5 episodes	
1998	The Games	Kaetrina	1 episode	
1999	Wildside	Clara Jasek	1 episode	
2000–2002	Blue Heelers	Sophie Andrikidis	4 episodes	
2001	The Secret Life of Us	Mrs. Konstantinidis	1 episode	
2002	Short Cuts	Mrs Papasavas	7 episodes	
2002	MDA	Sue Sharp	1 episode	
2011	Bed of Roses	Magistrate	1 episode	
2012–2014	Neighbours	Patricia Pappas	6 episodes	
2015–2020	Wentworth	Officer Brenda Murphy / Nurse Collins	8 episodes	
2016	Little Acorns	Katerina	Web series, 3 episodes	
2017	The Ex-PM	Magistrate	1 episode	
2017	Seven Types of Ambiguity	Hamide	Miniseries, 1 episode	
2026	Become the One	Maria	Web series, 4 episodes	

=== Film ===
Year	Title	Role	Notes	Ref
1998	Head On	Ariadne		
2002	Magda		Short	
2009	Thicker Than Water		Short	
2010	Word of Mouth	Olga	Short	
2010	Where the Heart Is		Short	
2010	Wog Boy 2: Kings of Mykonos	Katerina	Uncredited	
2011	Joey	Toy Store Attendant	Short	
2011	A Slap in the Face		Short	
2011	Surviving Georgia	Angela		
2012	Satisfy	Mother	Short	
2012	Catch Perfect	Carlotta	Short	
2022	Home Truths	Helen	Short	
2025	End Pointe	Fran	Short	

== Stage ==
Year	Title	Role	Notes	Ref.
1988	Somewhere in Here are Henry and Louisa		Organ Factory, Melbourne	
	The White Rose			
1989	The Heartbreak Kid		Melbourne Athenaeum	
1990	Happiness	Tanya	La Mama, Melbourne	
1991	Pericles	Daughter of Antiochus / Fisherwoman / Servant / Marina	Theatre Works, Melbourne	
1998	The Forty Lounge Café		La Mama, Melbourne	
1999	Born Yesterday	Helen	Playhouse, Melbourne with MTC	
2002	Paradise		La Mama, Melbourne	
2005	Cruel and Tender	Physiotherapist	Fairfax Studio, Melbourne with MTC	
2009	Cafe Rebetika!	Katerina	Arts Centre Melbourne	
2010	All About My Mother		Southbank Theatre, Melbourne with MTC	
2016	The Honey Bees	Kerrie	Red Stitch Actors Theatre, Melbourne	
2016	Play for Australia		Fairfax Studio, Melbourne	
2022	Security	Naz	Northcote Town Hall, Melbourne with Darebin Arts	
2024	Eftihia – Life Has Two Doors	Eftihia Papagiannopoulou	La Mama, Melbourne	
2025	These Other Things	Special guest	Capitol Theatre, Melbourne	
Undated	Betrayal		La Mama, Melbourne	
Undated	The Last Proxy		Australian tour	
Undated	Punuyiota		Writers Festival	
Undated	AIMA		Universal Theatre, Melbourne	
Undated	The Magic Bow		QLD tour	
