= List of mayors of Whittlesea =

This is a list of mayors and chair administrators of the City of Whittlesea, a local government area in Melbourne, Australia since 1997.

== Mayors (1997 - 2020) ==
Mayor	Term
Sam Alessi	1997–1998
Frank Merlino	1998-1999
John Fry	1999-2000
Sam Alessi	2000–2001
John Fry	2001–2002
Frank Merlino	2002–2003
Frank Merlino	2003–2004
Lara Clarli	2004–2005
Sam Alessi	2004–2005
John Fry	2005–2006
Kris Pavlidis	2006–2007
Elizabeth Nealy	2007–2008
Mary Lalios	2008–2009
Mary Lalios	2009–2010
Rex Griffin	2010-2011
Stevan Kozmevski	2011–2012
Rex Griffin	2012–2013
Mary Lalios	2013–2014
Ricky Kirkham	2014–2015
Stevan Kozmevski	2015–2016
Ricky Kirkham	2016–2017
Kris Pavlidis	2017–2018
Lawrie Cox	2018–2019
Emilia Lisa Sterjova	2019 - Entire Council dismissed March 2020

== Chair Administrators (2020 - 2024) ==
Administrator	Term
Lydia Wilson	2020 - 2024

== Mayors (2024 - present) ==
Mayor	Term
Aidan McLindon	2024 - 2025
Martin Taylor	2025 - 2025
Lawrie Cox	2025–present

== See also ==
- Local government areas of Victoria
