= The Ex-PM =

2015 comedy Australian TV series

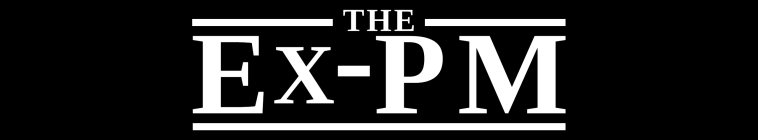
- Genre: Comedy
- Written by: Shaun Micallef
- Directed by: Sian Davies; Shaun Wilson
- Starring: Shaun Micallef; Lucy Honigman; Nicki Wendt; Kate Jenkinson; Nicholas Bell; Francis Greenslade; Jackson Tozer; Ming-Zhu Hii; John Clarke
- Country of origin: Australia
- No. of series: 2
- No. of episodes: 12

Production
- Production company: CJZ

Original release
- Network: ABC
- Release: 14 October 2015 – 6 December 2017

The Ex-PM is an Australian television comedy series.

The six-part series first aired on the ABC on Wednesday 14 October 2015. It was written by and stars Shaun Micallef with director Sian Davies and producer Nick Murray for Cordell Jigsaw Zapruder. The series focuses on Andrew Dugdale (Micallef), a fictional former Prime Minister of Australia, who struggles to adjust to private life, filmed in the Banyule Homestead.

Season two of the show premiered on 26 October 2017.

== Synopsis ==
=== Season 1 ===
Former prime minister Andrew Dugdale (Micallef) owes his publishers an advance, and is assigned a ghostwriter to help him write his memoirs.

=== Season 2 ===
At his party's request, Dugdale stands for election in a marginal rural seat. Moving into the town's sewage farm, he campaigns on local issues in a race beset by corruption. A mysterious benefactor donates A$1 million to his campaign.

== Cast ==
=== Main ===
- Shaun Micallef as Andrew Dugdale
- Lucy Honigman as Ellen
- Nicki Wendt as Catherine
- Kate Jenkinson as Carol
- Nicholas Bell as Sonny
- Francis Greenslade as Curtis
- Jackson Tozer as Myles
- Ming-Zhu Hii as Rita
- John Clarke as Henry

=== Recurring ===
- Drew Tingwell as Mr Vole (2 episodes)
- Emily Taheny as Bertha Quigley (2 episodes)
- Frank Woodley as Reece (2 episodes)
- Nick Farnell as George (2 episodes)
- Owen Wahrenberger as Stefan (5 episodes)
- Tony Rickards as Crazy Joe (3 episodes)
- Vince Colosimo as Fabian Silver (3 episodes)

=== Guests ===
- Bob Franklin as Keith
- Grant Piro as Bambino
- Greg Stone as Neil Blanchard
- Ian Smith as Cardinal Bell
- Katerina Kotsonis as Magistrate
- Lachy Hulme as Himself
- Lisa McCune as Lorelei Baggins
- Shane Jacobson as Butcher
- Syd Brisbane as Loins
- Tegan Higginbotham as Floor Manager

== Episodes ==
=== Series overview ===
Series	Episodes	Originally released		DVD release date (Region 4)
Series	Episodes	First released	Last released	DVD release date (Region 4)
1	6	14 October 2015	18 November 2015	11 November 2015
2	6	26 October 2017	30 November 2017	6 December 2017

=== Season 1 (2015) ===
No. overall	No. in season	Title	Directed by	Written by	Original release date	Australian viewers
1	1	"Arrival"	Sian Davies	Shaun Micallef	14 October 2015	803,000
2	2	"Childhood"	Sian Davies	Shaun Micallef	21 October 2015	660,000
3	3	"Legacy"	Sian Davies	Shaun Micallef	28 October 2015	580,000
4	4	"Rivalry"	Sian Davies	Shaun Micallef	4 November 2015	622,000
5	5	"Immortality"	Sian Davies	Shaun Micallef	11 November 2015	594,000
6	6	"Love"	Sian Davies	Shaun Micallef	18 November 2015	553,000

=== Season 2 (2017) ===
No. overall	No. in season	Title	Directed by	Written by	Original release date	Australian viewers
7	1	"Money"	Shaun Wilson	Shaun Micallef	26 October 2017	454,000
8	2	"Power"	Shaun Wilson	Shaun Micallef	2 November 2017	365,000
9	3	"Image"	Shaun Wilson	Gary McCaffrie	9 November 2017	302,000
10	4	"Justice"	Shaun Wilson	Shaun Micallef	16 November 2017	318,000
11	5	"Faith"	Shaun Wilson	Shaun Micallef	23 November 2017	310,000
12	6	"Reckoning"	Shaun Wilson	Shaun Micallef	30 November 2017	322,000

== See also ==
- List of Australian television series
- List of programs broadcast by ABC (Australian TV network)
