= Stalactites (restaurant) =

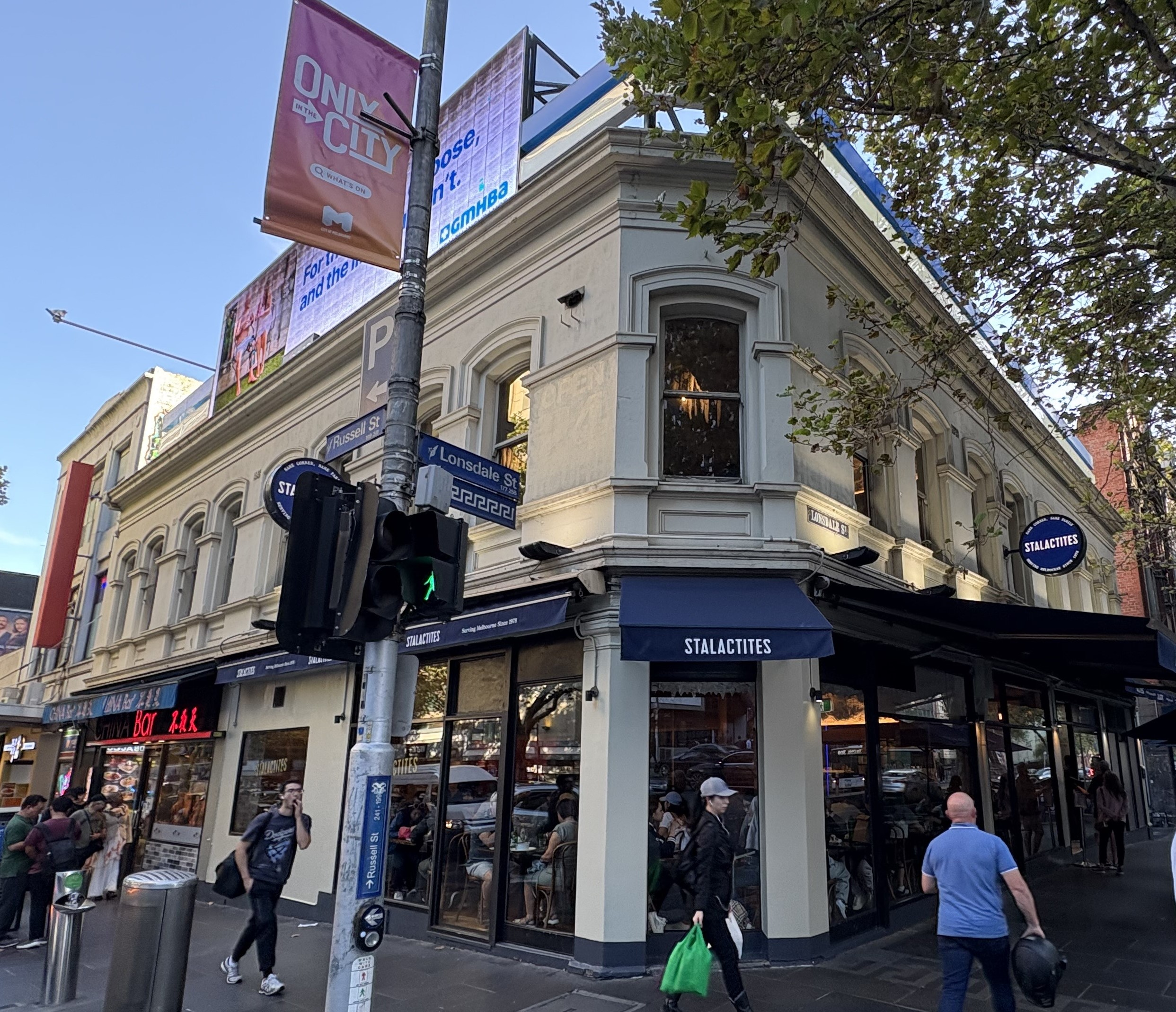
- Stalactites in March 2025

Restaurant information
- Established: 1978
- Owner: Konstantinos Tsoutouras's descendants
- Previous owner: Konstantinos Tsoutouras
- Location: Melbourne
- Website: stalactites.com.au

Stalactites is a Greek-Australian restaurant in Melbourne, Australia. It is located on Lonsdale street in the Melbourne's CBD's Greek quarter.

The restaurant was founded in 1978 by Konstantinos Tsoutouras, also known as Barba Kostas. He had previously opened other chain restaurants and fish and chips stores, before opening Stalactites. It initially opened as a 24-hour restaurant, and became a part of Melbourne's nightlife. Today, it is owned and operated by the descendants of its founder.

It has been described as 'an institution in Melbourne's culinary scene' and is known for being frequented by celebrities including Greek tennis players. In 2019, Stalactites named a special souvlaki after Greek tennis player Stefanos Tsitsipas. In 2022 the restaurant collaborated with the tennis player to bring back the special, with proceeds going to Beyond Blue.

Stalactites was heavily affected by the COVID-19 pandemic.

== Hella Good ==
Logo of souvlaki brand owned by Stalactites established in 2017, 'Hella Good'

In 2017, the owners of Stalactites created a fast-food souvlaki take-away chain named 'Hella Good', neighbouring the restaurant. In 2020 this brand absorbed another souvlaki brand, Jimmy Grants, which went into liquidation after financial troubles experienced by its founder George Calombaris.
