= Jimmy Grants =

Restaurant information
- Established: 2013
- Closed: 2020
- Previous owner: Made Establishment Group
- Website: https://jimmygrants.com.au/

Jimmy Grants was a Greek-Australian souvlaki fast-food chain started in Australia by George Calombaris through his company Made Establishment Group.

Whilst operating, the chain had multiple Melbourne locations including at Fitzroy, Emporium, Ormond, Richmond, and Ringwood. The chain also opened a store in Sydney.

The name of the restaurant stems from migrant experiences of Greek-Australians being nicknamed 'Jimmy Grant' (like 'immigrant') when co-workers on the docks found their names difficult to pronounce.

Its flagship store in Richmond was architected in a tribute to 'an Australian suburban home, as experienced through the eyes of a migrant'.

In 2020 following financial trouble at Made, Jimmy Grants was disestablished, with its stores being absorbed by the Stalactites Group under its souvlaki brand 'Hella Good'. Stalactites attempted retain staff during acquisition.
