= Collingwood, Victoria =

Collingwood
- Suburb
- Aerial view of Collingwood looking south west toward Victoria Parade; Hoddle Street (left) and Smith Street on (top right)

- Interactive map of Collingwood
- Coordinates: 37.8019°S 144.98815°E
- Country: Australia
- State: Victoria
- City: Melbourne
- LGA: City of Yarra
- Location: 3 km (1.9 mi) from Melbourne
- Established: 1850s

Government
  - State electorate: Richmond
  - Federal division: Melbourne

Area
  - Total: 1.3 km^{2} (0.50 sq mi)
- Elevation: 25 m (82 ft)

Population
  - Total: 9,179 (SAL 2021)
  - Density: 7,217/km^{2} (18,690/sq mi)
- Postcode: 3066
Suburbs around Collingwood
Fitzroy North	Clifton Hill	Clifton Hill
Fitzroy	Collingwood	Abbotsford
Melbourne	East Melbourne	Richmond

Collingwood is an inner-city suburb in Melbourne, Victoria, Australia, 3 km north-east of the Melbourne central business district, located within the City of Yarra local government area. Collingwood recorded a population of 9,179 at the 2021 census.

The area now known as Collingwood is thought to have been named Yálla-birr-ang by the Wurundjeri people, the original Indigenous inhabitants of the area. Following colonisation, the suburb was named in 1842 after Baron Collingwood or an early hotel which bore his name. Collingwood is one of the oldest suburbs in Melbourne and is bordered by Smith Street, Alexandra Parade, Hoddle Street and Victoria Parade.

Collingwood is notable for its historical buildings, with many nineteenth century dwellings, shops and factories still in use. Its major thoroughfare Smith Street, is one of Melbourne's major nightlife and retail strips, and has been voted the coolest street in the world. A former industrial suburb, Collingwood is now considered one of Melbourne's gay villages and houses a number of creative arts businesses.

== History ==
=== Toponymy ===
The suburb was named after Lord Horatio Nelson's 'favourite admiral' Cuthbert Collingwood, 1st Baron Collingwood (or, possibly after the Collingwood Hotel which existed there and was named after the admiral) by surveyor Robert Hoddle, under instructions from Superintendent Charles La Trobe, in 1842.

=== Establishment ===
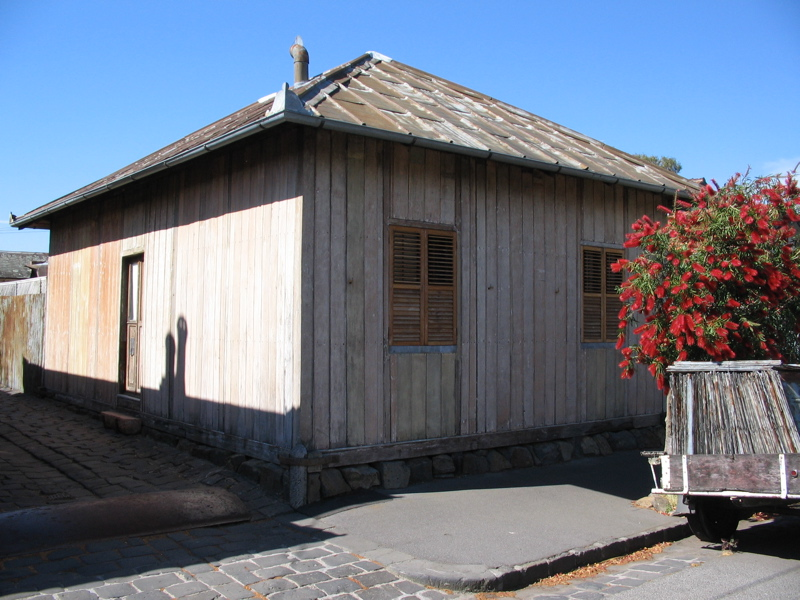
Prefabricated houses imported from Singapore during the 1850s

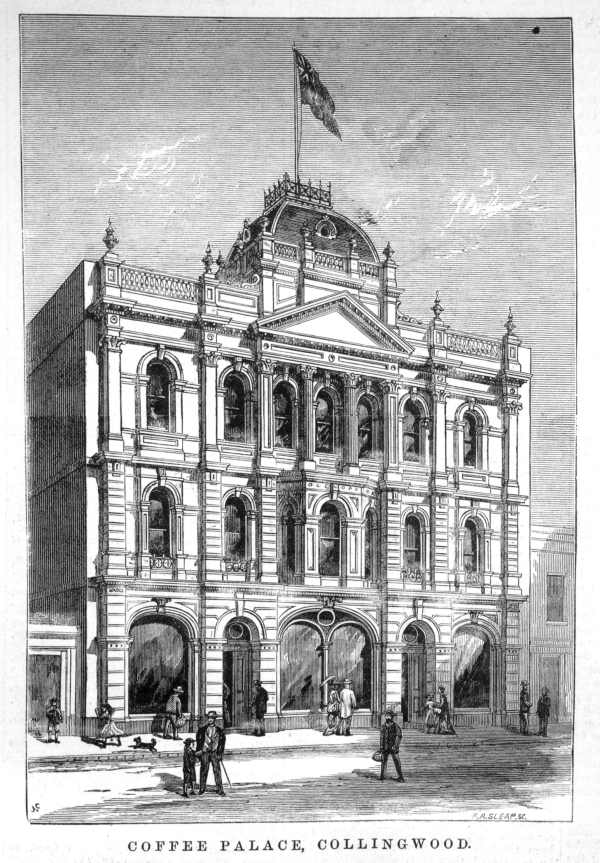
Collingwood Coffee Palace in 1879. It now forms part of the facade of Woolworths in Smith Street.

Subdivision and sale of land in Collingwood began in 1838, and was mostly complete by the 1850s. Collingwood was declared a municipality, separate from the City of Melbourne on 24 April 1855, the first to follow the state's major population centres of Melbourne and Geelong. Collingwood was proclaimed a town in 1873, and later a city in 1876.

Collingwood's early development was directly impacted by the boom in Melbourne's population and economy during the Victorian gold rush of the 1850s and 1860s. This resulted in the construction of a large number of small dwellings, as well as schools, shops and churches to support this new population. Around the same time, large industrial developments such as a flour mill and the Fosters brewery were being established.

=== 19th and 20th centuries ===
In the 1870s, Smith Street became the dominant shopping strip, with its tram line established in 1887. Many of Collingwood's grand public buildings were erected in the 1880s, including the post office and town hall. Collingwood also had a strong temperance movement, with two "coffee palaces" springing up in the 1870s, including the large and grand Collingwood Coffee Palace (now the facade of Woolworths – minus original classical pediment and mansard).

At the turn of the century Collingwood's Smith Street rivalled Chapel Street in Prahran as the dominant home of suburban emporiums and department stores. The first G.J. Coles store was opened in the street in 1912.

Since the 1950s, Collingwood has been home to many groups battling to save the suburb's unique character against development and gentrification.

In 1958 residents rallied at Collingwood Town Hall against the Housing Commission of Victoria's slum reclamation projects, which would see demolition orders for 122 of the suburb's homes.

In the 1970s, 150 residents protested against plans for the F-19 freeway, with some putting themselves in front of earthmovers during the construction. In 1977, two women were killed in their home in northern Collingwood in what became known as the Easey Street murders. No arrest for the crime was made until September 2024.

Collingwood underwent gentrification throughout the 1990s. House prices reflected this change. In 1987 Collingwood's median house price was 86% of the median for metropolitan Melbourne. It had risen to 117% in 1996. Despite this there remained significant social issues. 21% of Collingwood's children were in families receiving welfare benefits in 1997.

=== Recent history ===
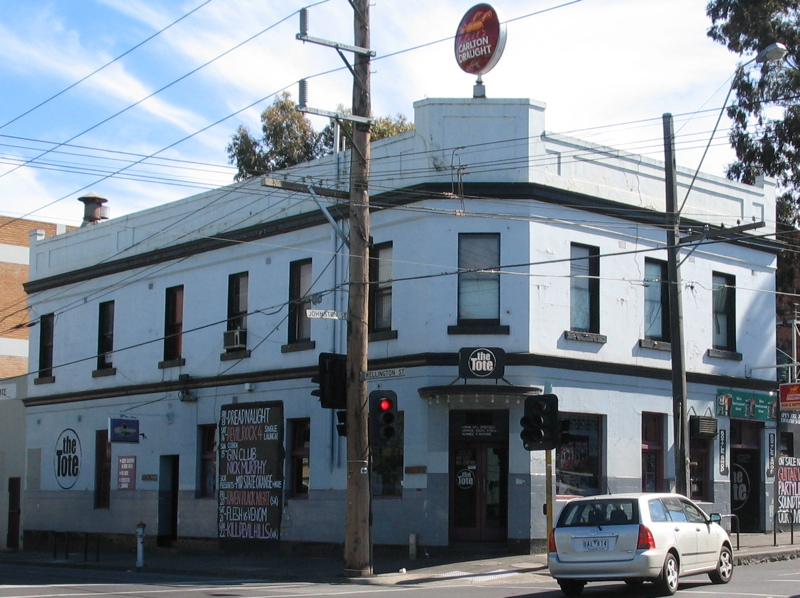
The hotel and music venue The Tote is considered an icon of Melbourne's rock and roll scene.

The Collingwood Action Group formed in 2006 to fight the "Banco" development, a large mixed use project on Smith Street. In 2010, over 2,000 people rallied to save The Tote Hotel, a popular live music venue, which became a potential state election issue. The 2016 Bendigo Street housing dispute occurred in north-east Collingwood, in which the community took control of up to 15 empty state government owned houses, in an attempt to provide housing for Melbourne's rising homeless population, in the absence of adequate public housing.

In recent years, the office sector has grown in Collingwood, with a number of developments in its southern former industrial area, with some major companies locating their headquarters in the suburb.

== Geography ==
Collingwood's topography is mostly flat, but a prominent slope extends from Hoddle Street up to Smith Street, and also along sections of Hoddle Street.

The suburb is notable for its historical buildings, with many nineteenth century dwellings, shops and factories still in use. From its early days large commercial buildings often coexisted with small dwellings, occupied by working-class families and the mixture of industry and community continues to the present time. For example, Oxford and Cambridge Streets are dominated by imposing red-brick factories and warehouses, formerly occupied by Foy & Gibson, but also feature a number of stone, brick and timber dwellings that date back to the earliest days of the suburb.

== Culture ==
=== Sport ===
Collingwood Football Club has a history dating back to 1892 as an incorporated football club. They were once housed at Victoria Park and are now based at the Melbourne Cricket Ground (MCG).

In recent years they won the 2023 Grand Final against the Brisbane Lions. They have won 16 VFL/AFL premierships, which is the equal-most in the league along with Carlton and Essendon, and also won the 1896 VFA premiership.

=== Community radio ===
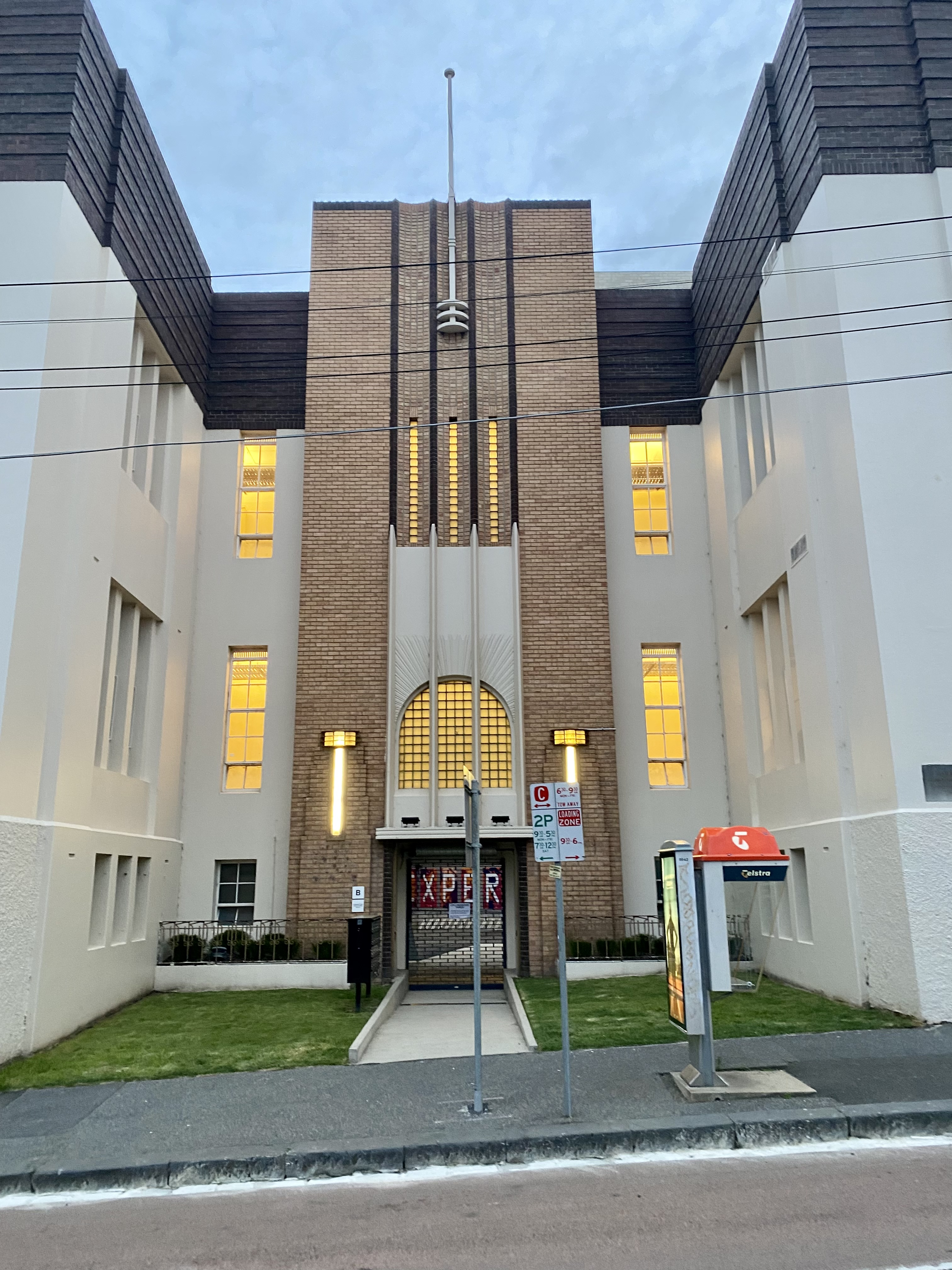
The Johnston Street entrance to Collingwood Yards, which houses a number of galleries, studios, artist spaces and arts businesses

3CR is an independent community radio station that is located at the Victoria Parade end of Smith Street. The station has been based in the suburb since 1977 and its frequency is 855AM.

PBS 106.7FM relocated from St Kilda to Collingwood and is located at 47 Easey Street. PBS is a community radio station that celebrated its 25th year of broadcasting in 2004.

=== Arts ===
The Collingwood Arts Precinct, known as Collingwood Yards, is located on the site of the former Collingwood Technical School and opened on 13 March 2021. Circus Oz is also located in the Yards on Perry Street and has a purpose-built Melba Spiegeltent.

=== Economy ===
Media distributor Madman Entertainment, vitamin brand Swisse and luxury cosmetics brand Aesop have their headquarters located in Collingwood. Many architecture firms are based or have offices in Collingwood and neighbouring Fitzroy, including the headquarters of DKO Architecture.

=== Commercial areas ===
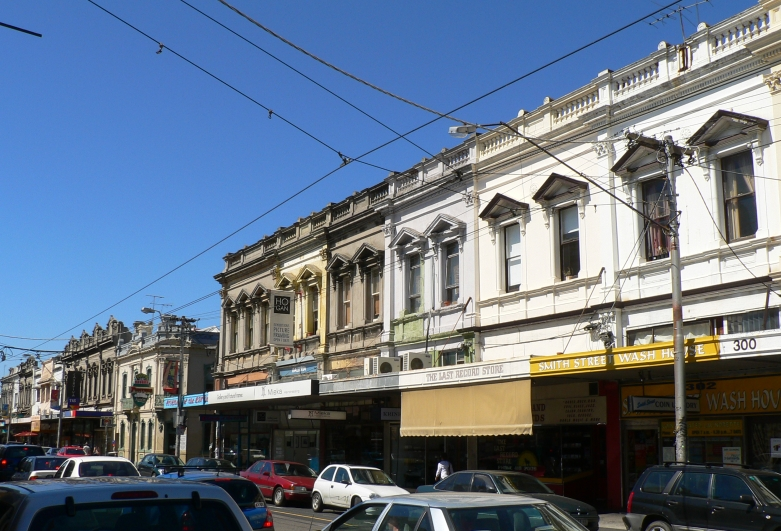
Smith Street in November 2006

The main commercial area is Smith Street, which borders Fitzroy. In 2021, Smith Street was named the coolest street in the world.

=== Gay village ===
Collingwood is one of Melbourne's gay villages with several gay oriented entertainment venues. These include the Peel Dancebar which, in 2007, was granted the legal right to ban heterosexual patrons from the bar. By November 2019, sex on premises venue Club 80 had operated in Collingwood for over twenty years, but was closed in 2020 after the sale of its building.

== Education ==
Collingwood Technical School was established in July 1912 as a trades and technical training school. The school closed in 1987 and, combined with the Preston Technical School, was the basis for the formation of the Melbourne Polytechnic, which has a Collingwood campus on Otter Street. In 2022, work began on a major upgrade to the Melbourne Polytechnic Collingwood campus.

Collingwood College, a state P-12 school, is located in the suburb. The private tertiary education provider Collarts is located in the suburb with its main campus on Wellington Street, and specialises in design and creative arts degrees.

== Demographics ==
Historical population
Year	Pop.	±%
2001	5,081	—
2006	5,493	+8.1%
2011	6,467	+17.7%
2016	8,513	+31.6%
2021	9,179	+7.8%

In the 2021 census, there were 9,179 people in Collingwood. 58.4% of people were born in Australia. The next most common countries of birth were England 4.3%, New Zealand 3.6%, Vietnam 3.1%, Ethiopia 1.9% and China 1.8%. 68.3% of people spoke only English at home. Other languages spoken at home included Vietnamese 4.0%, Mandarin 2.2%, Somali 1.9%, Oromo 1.8%, and Cantonese 1.7%. The most common response for religion was No Religion at 58%.

=== Housing ===
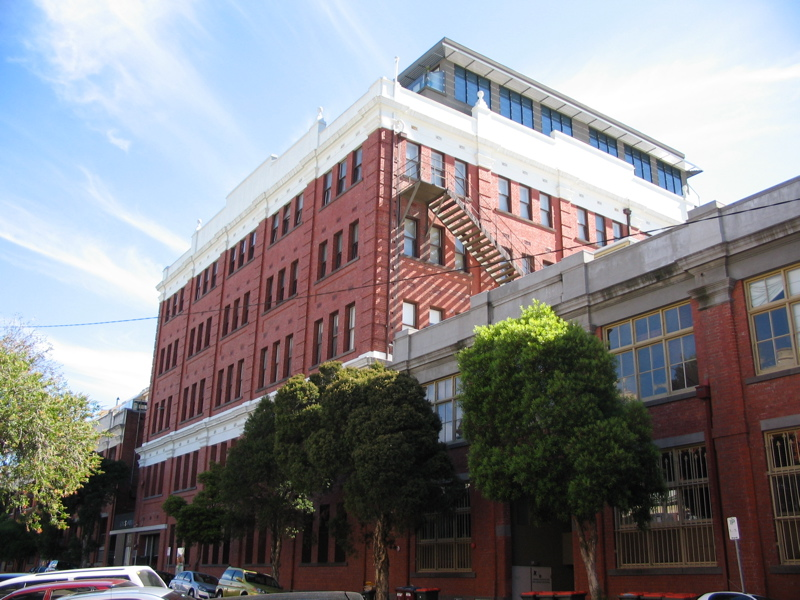
Many of Collingwood's warehouses and factories have been converted into apartments.

Collingwood's housing consists of a large number of high-rise housing commission flats and a number of older single and double storey former workers cottages on small subdivisions.

More recently older warehouses and factories have been converted into apartments and there has been modern townhouse infill and medium density unit development.

== Governance ==
The City of Collingwood existed from 1855 until 1994. The suburb is now part of the City of Yarra local government area.

At the federal level, Collingwood is part of the Division of Melbourne. Since the 2025 Australian federal election, it has been represented by Sarah Witty of the Australian Labor Party.

== Public and commercial buildings ==
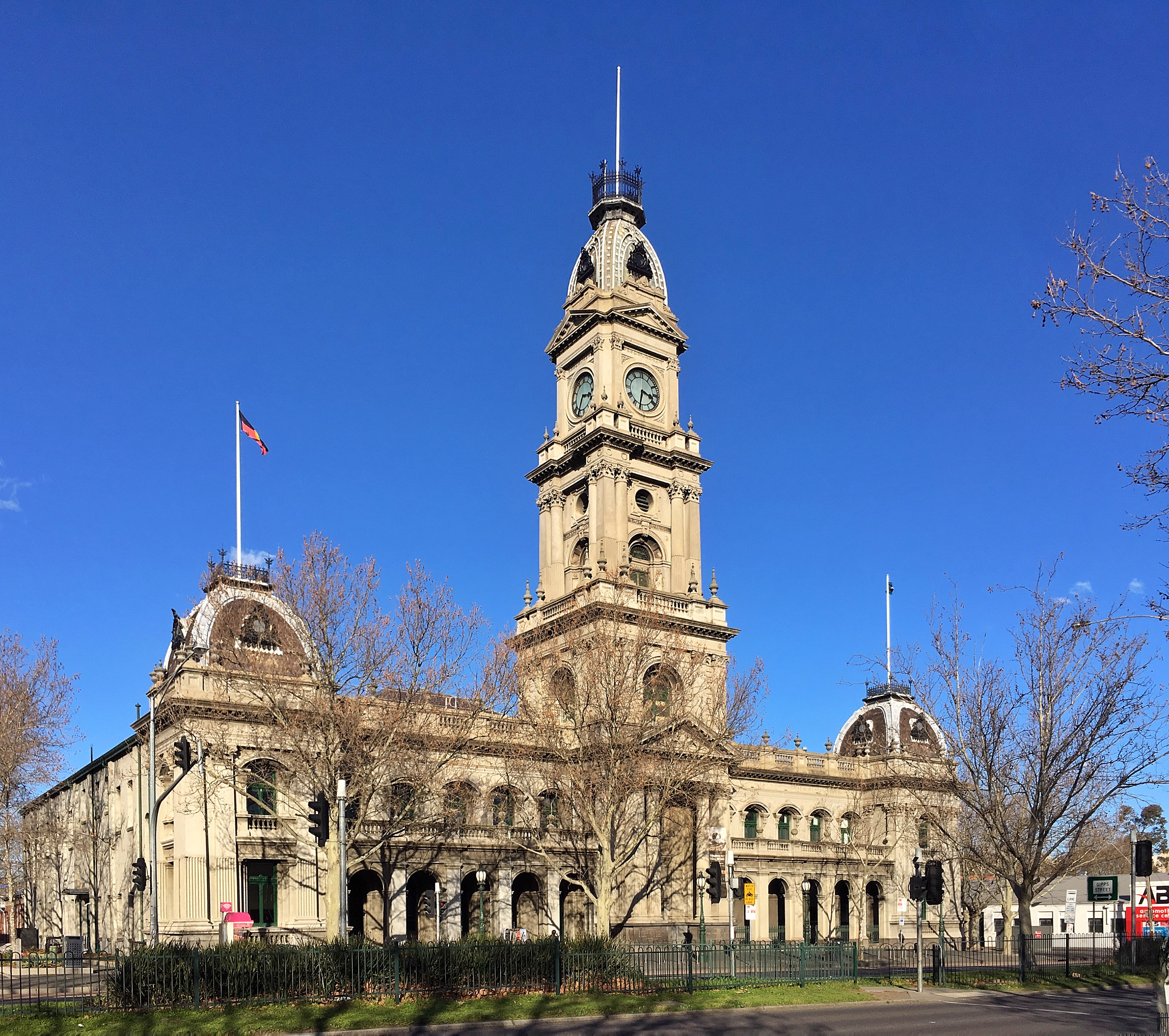
Collingwood Town Hall

Collingwood has many buildings listed on the Victorian Heritage Register and several notable commercial and public buildings. Yorkuprhire Brewery, built in 1880 to the design of James Wood, with its polychrome brick and mansard roof tower, was once Melbourne's tallest building. For many years it has been subject to development proposals and the heritage stables were at one stage demolished without a permit. The site has since been converted to an apartment development.

The former Collingwood Post Office was built between 1891 and 1892 in the Victorian Mannerist style, to the design of John Marsden and is similar to Rupertswood, with its tall tower.

Prominent hotels include the Leinster Arms Hotel, established in 1865 and is the only single storey hotel built in Melbourne in that era, the Sir Robert Peel ("The Peel") Hotel and the Vine Hotel.

The original Collingwood Magistrates' Court closed on 1 February 1985, but continued local need saw the establishment of the Neighbourhood Justice Centre court in the suburb in 2007.

Despite its name, the Collingwood Children's Farm is in the neighbouring suburb of Abbotsford.

== Transport ==
The roads within Collingwood are mainly narrow one-way streets. The suburb is bounded by main roads: Smith Street to the west, Victoria Parade to the south, Hoddle Street to the east and Alexandra Parade to the north. Major tram routes are on Victoria Parade (tram route 109 and tram route 12) and Smith Street (route 86), which are on the edge of the suburb. Johnston, Wellington and Langridge Streets are the main arterials going through the suburb.

The suburb is served by the nearby Victoria Park and Collingwood railway stations, located in neighbouring Abbotsford.

Separated north-south cycling lanes began being installed on Wellington Street in 2013 and now run to Victoria Street. In 2018, the northern half of Collingwood and Fitzroy reduced its speed limits to 30 km/h, in a first for Melbourne.

== Popular culture ==
Australian author Frank Hardy set the novel Power Without Glory in a fictionalised version of the suburb, named Carringbush. The name is used by a number of businesses in the area, such as "Carringbush Business Centre". At one time a ward in the City of Yarra that includes part of Collingwood was actually named Carringbush.

== Notable people ==
- Emma Minnie Boyd (1858–1936), artist
- John Cowan Duncan (1901–1955), company manager
- Edward Petherick (1847–1917), Australian bookseller, book collector, bibliographer and archivist
- John Hunter Patterson (1841–1930), grazier and mining investor
- Keith Stackpole (born 1940), cricketer
- Mary Coustas (born 1964), comedian, actress
- Kris Pavlidis, First Greek female Mayor of the City of Whittlesea and long-serving councillor.
