= Greek Precinct, Melbourne =

Greek cultural area in Melbourne, Australia

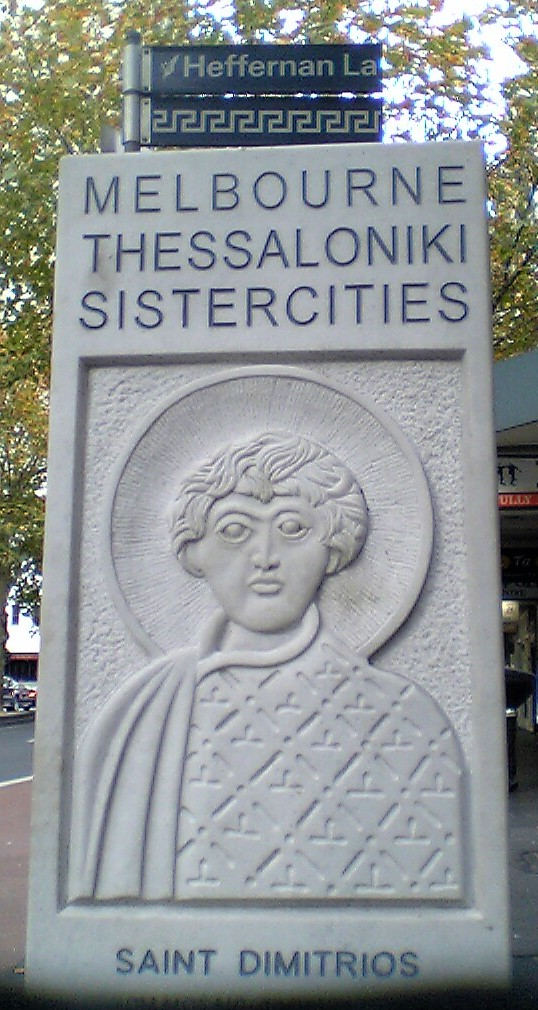
Monument to the Melbourne-Thessaloniki sister city relationship

The Greek Precinct, Melbourne (officially known as the Greek Quarter) in Victoria, Australia, is a Greek cultural area centred on the eastern end of Lonsdale Street in the Melbourne city centre. The area runs adjacent to Melbourne Chinatown on Little Bourke Street.

According to the 2016 Australian census, Melbourne has the largest Greek population in Australia with 173,598 Greeks, making up 3.87% of Greater Melbourne's population. Globally, Hellenic identity and values are passed on from one generation to the next and do not depend upon one's location in the world. As such, 88% of Greek Australians (regardless of country of birth) speak Greek and 91% are members of the Greek Orthodox Church.

Australia and Greece have a close bilateral relationship based on historical ties and the rich contribution of Greek Australians to Australian society. In 2019, the export of Australian services to Greece was valued at $92 million, while services imports from Greece totalled $750 million. Australia's stock of investment in Greece in 2019 totalled $481 million. Investment in Australia from Greece was $192 million.

As a result of the extensive historical and cultural ties between the Greek community of Melbourne and their Greek homeland, Melbourne is a sister city to Thessaloniki, Greece's second largest city and cultural centre.

== The Precinct ==
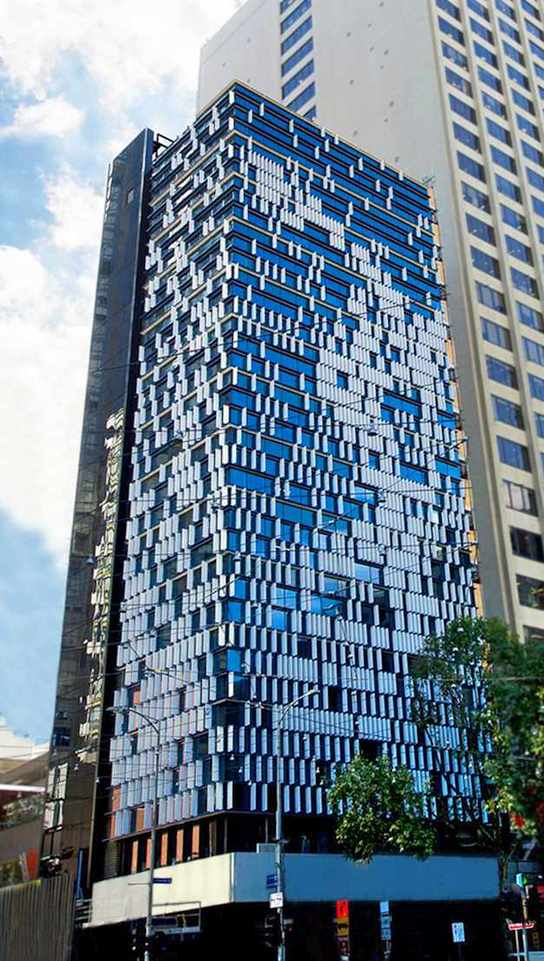
The Greek Centre for Contemporary Culture opened in 2014 on Lonsdale Street

The Greek Precinct is located between Swanston Street and Russell Street, along Lonsdale Street, in the Melbourne city centre. It is home to Greek restaurants Stalactites and Tsindos, and Caras Greek Shop, a Greek cultural shop.

In March 2009, the Government of Victoria and the City of Melbourne announced that the Greek Precinct would receive a A$3.5 million rejuvenation. 209 Lonsdale Street is the Sam Papasavas Building - the home of the Australia-Greek Learning and Resource Centre of the Royal Melbourne Institute of Technology (RMIT).

=== Greek Centre ===
At the corner of Lonsdale and Russell Streets stands the Greek Centre for Contemporary Culture (168 Lonsdale Street), completed in 2014 and operated by the Greek Community of Melbourne and Victoria. The 15 storey building houses 3 levels of event, conference and education spaces, a library and 10 levels of leased commercial spaces. It's distinctive façade includes a stylised image of the ancient Greek discus-thrower Discobulus.

== Antipodes Festival ==
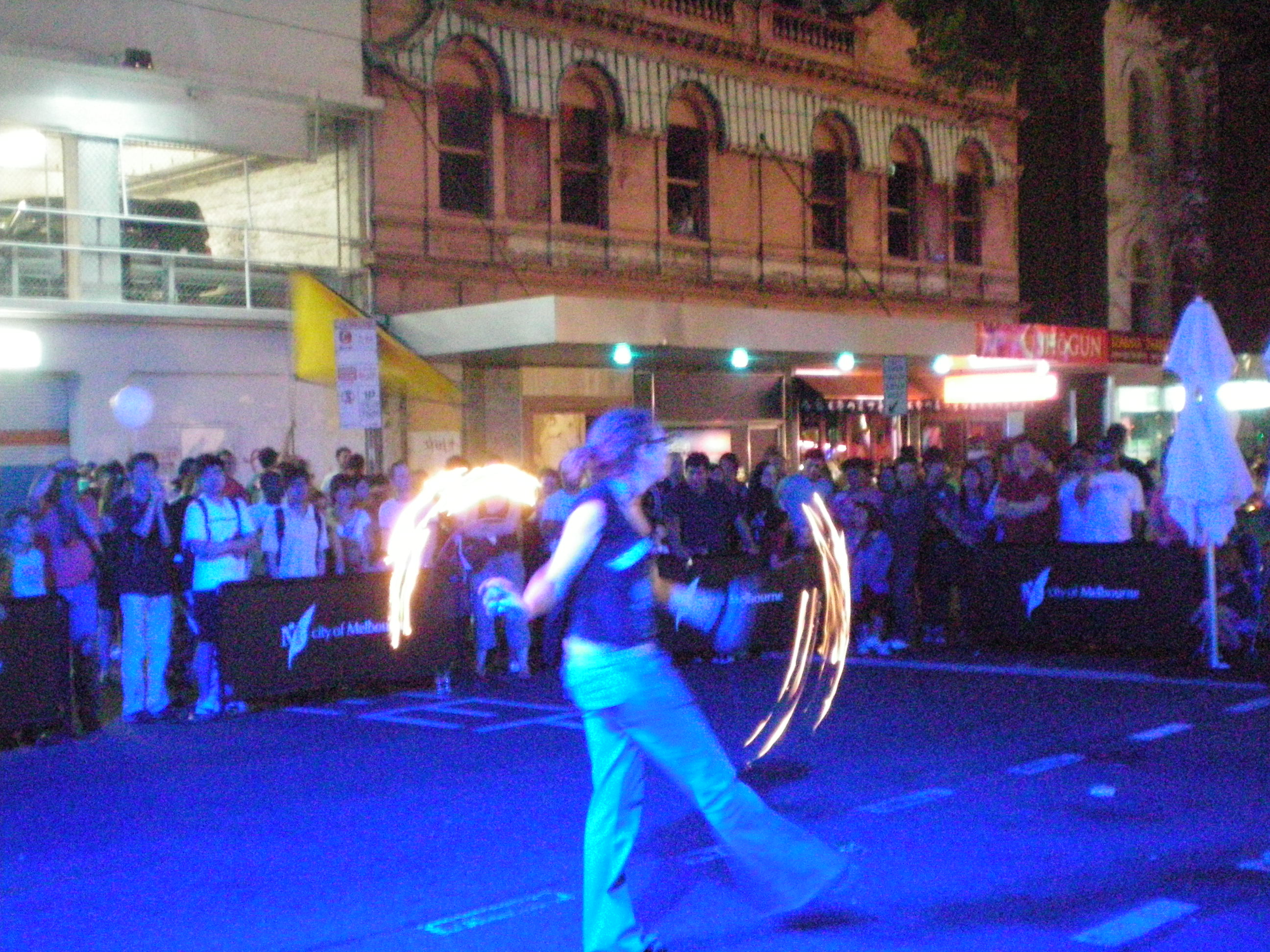
Fire dancing at the 2009 Lonsdale Street Glendi

The annual Melbourne Antipodes Festival is held on Lonsdale Street over a week in March, and has been held since 1987. The festival is renowned for its Lonsdale Street "Glendi" (Greek for "party") - a weekend-long event that is held to coincide with the Greek National Day (25 March).

Antipodes brings a weekend of Greek culture, food and entertainment to Melbourne's historic Greek Precinct. The festival features three stages of free entertainment, children's rides and activities and over 60 food, drink and craft stalls.

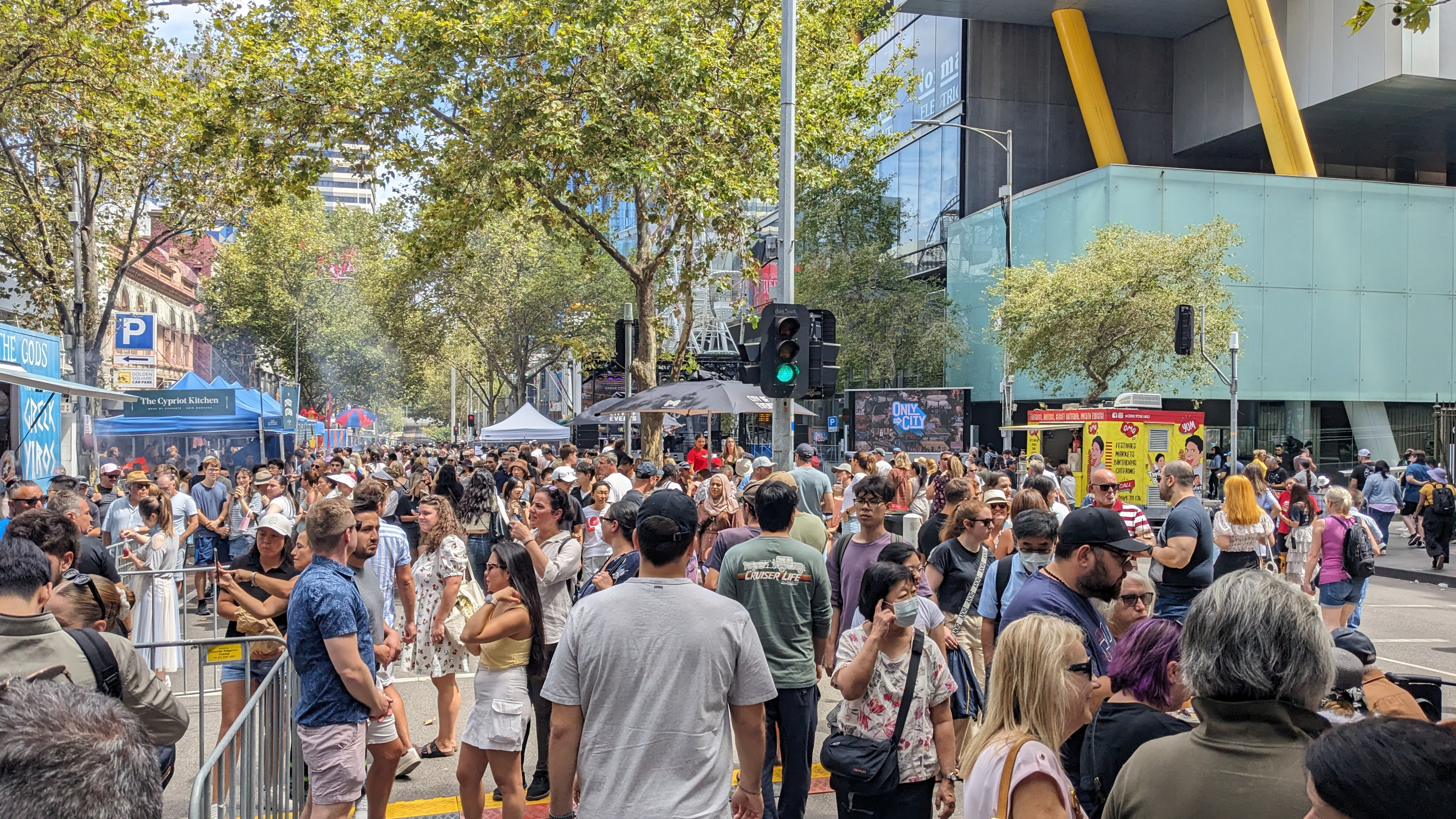
Crowds of people at the intersection of Lonsdale and Russell Streets during the 2024 Antipodes Festival.

The annual Greek Film Festival is held in Melbourne over two weeks in September, and has been held since 1990.

== See also ==
- Greeks of Melbourne
- Greek Australian
