= Postcode 3000 =

1990s urban planning program in Melbourne

Postcode 3000 was a planning policy for Melbourne, Australia coordinated by the City of Melbourne and supported by the state government, under newly-elected Premier Jeff Kennett. The policy, which began in 1992 and ran throughout the 1990s, was aimed at increasing residential development in the Melbourne central business district and St Kilda Road. At the time, these areas were primarily business districts and had low residential populations (only about 2,000 in the late 1980s, a decrease from about 5,500 in the 1960s).

The policy provided incentives for people living in the central area and for property developers to create housing, such as discounted council rates and fees and a streamlined planning approval process. Unoccupied lower-grade office buildings were converted to housing and new apartment towers were constructed. The fruits of these efforts eventually spilled out into the neighbouring suburbs of Southbank, Docklands and later Carlton.

The program also included programs to improve streetscapes, such as by planting trees and creating open and green space. Many of Melbourne's laneways and arcades were redeveloped and gentrified during this time.

After implementation, the population of the inner-city area increased dramatically and 3000 new apartments were produced before the end of the decade. The policy had the additional benefit of reducing office vacancy rates, which had been at their highest level in decades.

Today, Postcode 3000 is generally considered to have been successful in increasing the number of central-city residents and revitalising the city centre. The number of dwellings in the area has increased to 28,000 and the population has grown to over 116,000. However, there are concerns about how the increase in high-rise residential buildings during the 2010s might affect the city centre in the future.

== See also ==
- Melbourne 2030
