= Greek Australian Short Film Festival =

The Greek Australian Short Film Festival (GASFF) is an annual film festival based in Melbourne, Australia, which showcases films produced by Greeks and individuals of Greek descent.

== History ==
The festival was founded in 2010 by Jim Koutsoukos and Ange Arabatzis to showcase local short films, and was screened in a bar in downtown Melbourne. The festival later became a programming partner of Delphi Bank Greek Film Festival, and subsequently expanded to include both local and international films. The 9th Greek Australian Short Film Festival coincided with the 25th anniversary of the Greek Film Festival, and took place in October 2018.

The festival showcases short films in three categories: International Shorts, Australian Documentary Shorts, and Australian Shorts. Films are judged by a panel of prominent Greek figures in entertainment.
