= Kris Pavlidis =

Australian politician

Kris Pavlidis is an Australian social worker and former elected representative in local government in Australia. She served as a councillor of the City of Whittlesea from 2005 until 2020. She was elected Mayor of the City of Whittlesea from 2006 to 2007 and again from 2017 to 2018.

== Early life and career ==
Pavlidis is of Greek heritage and grew up in Australia in a Greek-speaking household.

She worked with Action on Disability within Ethnic Communities (ADEC) between 1989 and 1998.

=== Whittlesea City Council ===
Pavlidis was first elected to Whittlesea City Council in 2005 and served four consecutive terms. She was elected mayor by fellow councillors in 2006 and again in 2017. In August 2018, she was among a group of Victorian mayors who signed an open letter supporting members of the South Sudanese community. Her term on council concluded in March 2020 when the Victorian Government dismissed the City of Whittlesea Council following a governance inquiry.

Pavlidis served as Chair of the Ethnic Communities Council of Victoria from 2017 to 2019. In December 2020, she was elected President of PRONIA. She has also served in a leadership role with the Federation of Ethnic Communities' Councils of Australia.

In 2015, Pavlidis received a Ten-Year Service Award from the Municipal Association of Victoria. She was included in the publication Greek Women of Influence: 1821–2021 (2021).

== See also ==
- City of Whittlesea
- Greek Australians
- Women in Australia
- List of people from Melbourne
