= Greek Australians =

Australians born in Greece or with Greek ancestry

Ελληνοαυστραλοί

Total population
- 424,750 (by ancestry, 2021) (1.7% of the Australian population); 92,314 (by birth, 2021)

Regions with significant populations
- Melbourne, Sydney, Adelaide, Brisbane, Perth, Darwin, Home Hill

Languages
- Australian English · Greek (Greco-Australian)

Religion
- Christianity (Greek Orthodoxy)

Related ethnic groups
- Cypriot Australians · Greek New Zealanders · Greek diaspora

Greek Australians (Greek: Ελληνοαυστραλοί, romanized: Ellinoafstralí) are one of the largest groups within the global Greek diaspora. As per the 2021 Australian census, 424,750 people stated that they had Greek ancestry (whether alone or in combination with another ancestry), comprising 1.7% of the Australian population. At the 2021 census, 92,314 Australian residents were born in Greece.

Greek immigration to Australia has been one of the largest migratory flows in the history of Australia, especially after World War II and the Greek Civil War. The flow of migrants from Greece increased slightly in 2015 due to the economic crisis in Greece, with Australia as one of the main destinations for departing Greeks, mainly to Melbourne, where the Greek Australian community is most deeply established.

88% of Greek Australians speak Greek and 91% are Christians and members of the Greek Orthodox Church.

Australia and Greece have a close bilateral relationship based on historical ties and the rich contribution of Greek Australians to Australian society. In 2019, the export of Australian services to Greece was valued at $92 million, while services imports from Greece totalled $750 million. Australia's stock of investment in Greece in 2019 totalled $481 million, while investment in Australia from Greece was $192 million.

== History ==
=== Early Greek immigration ===
Greek immigration to Australia began in the early colonial period in the 19th century. The first known Greeks arrived in 1829. These Greeks were seven sailors, convicted of piracy by a British naval court, and were sentenced to transportation to New South Wales. Though they were eventually pardoned, two of those seven Greeks stayed and settled in the country. One settled on the Monaro Plains in Southern New South Wales and one at Picton near Sydney. Their names were Ghikas Bulgaris known as Jigger Bulgari, and Andonis Manolis. Jigger Bulgari married an Irish woman, and they had many children. Jigger was buried at Nimmitabel Pioneer Cemetery. The Hellenic Club of Canberra laid a commemorative marble plaque over his resting place around 2000. Andonis Manolis' grave is in the old cemetery at Mittagong. The first known free Greek migrant to Australia was Katerina Georgia Plessos (1809–1907), who arrived in Sydney with her husband Major James Crummer in 1835. They married in 1827 on the island of Kalamos where Crummer, the island's commandant, met the young refugee from the Greek independence wars. In her youth, she must have been one of the last living people to speak to Lord Byron. They lived in Sydney, Newcastle and Port Macquarie and had 11 children. The first wave of free Hellenic migrants commenced in the 1850s, and continued through the end of the 19th century, prompted in part by the recent discovery of gold in the country.

=== 20th-century Greek immigration ===
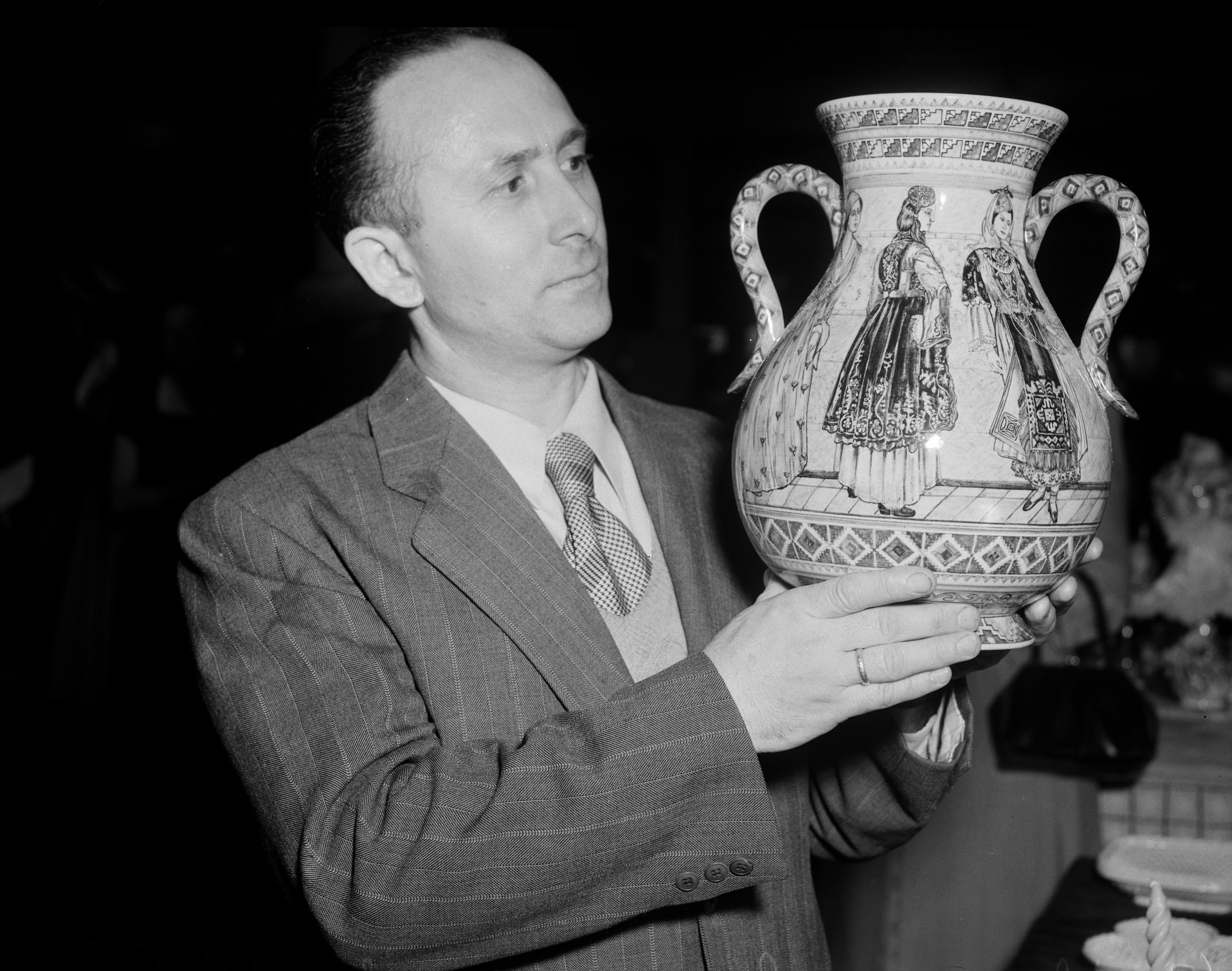
Orpheus Arfaras, Greek ceramicist, Sydney, 1952

From the last decade of the 19th century until World War I, the number of Greeks immigrating to Australia increased steadily and Hellenic communities were reasonably well established in Melbourne and Sydney at this time. The Greek language press began in Australia and in 1913, Australia had the first Greek weekly newspaper called Afstralia that was published in Melbourne.

Anna Perivolaris was a leading organiser of Greek culture in Sydney in the 1920s until she was head hunted to organise a Greek after school club in Perth.

There was a significant population of Greeks in Australia during World War I, especially from the Greek islands, which led to the community being heavily monitored and counted in a 'secret census' in 1916, due to questions of Greek loyalty as Greece was initially neutral during the war. Later the Greeks were raising money for the Greek Government in exile.

After the changes in Greece from the mid 1970s, including the fall of the Papadopoulos regime in 1974 and the formal inclusion of Greece into the European Union, Greek immigration to Australia has slowed since the 1971 peak of 160,200 arrivals. Within Australia, the Greek immigrants have been "extremely well organised socially and politically", with approximately 600 Greek organisations in the country by 1973, and immigrants have strived to maintain their faith and cultural identity.

By comparison, the Greek Cypriot community in Australia doubled following the Invasion of Cyprus and the Turkish-Greek Cypriot population exchange.

=== 21st-century Greek immigration ===
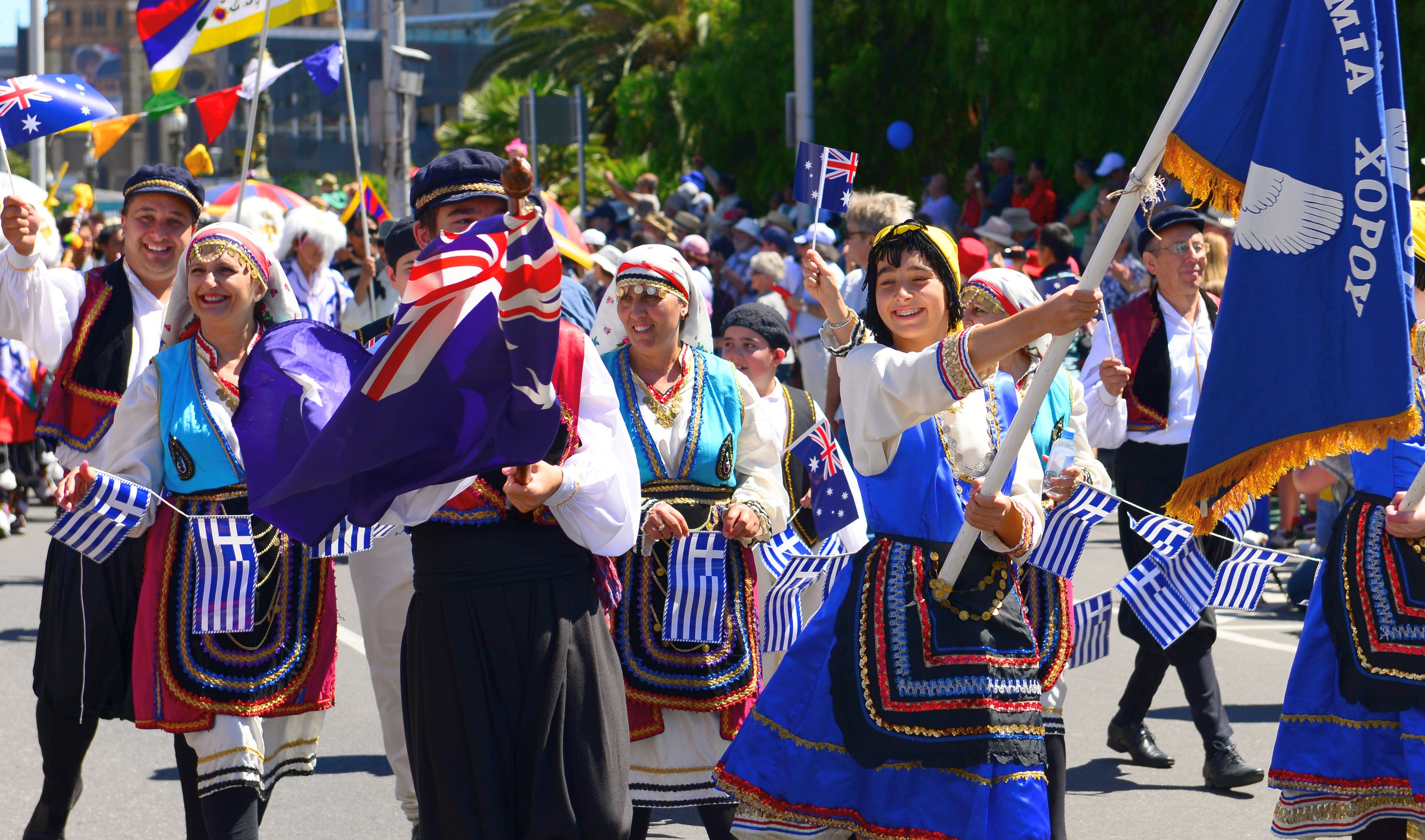
Greek Australians during a parade for Australia Day in Melbourne (2014)

As the economic crisis in Greece grew, the opportunities for temporary resident Greek Australians abroad were limited.

In the early 2010s, there was an increase of Greek immigration flows to Australia due to unemployment, among other issues, because of the economic crisis in Greece. This has led to the return of many Greek Australians which had gone to Greece before the crisis and also the arrival of newcomers from Greece, who have been received by the large Greek Australian community, mainly in Melbourne.

== Demographics ==

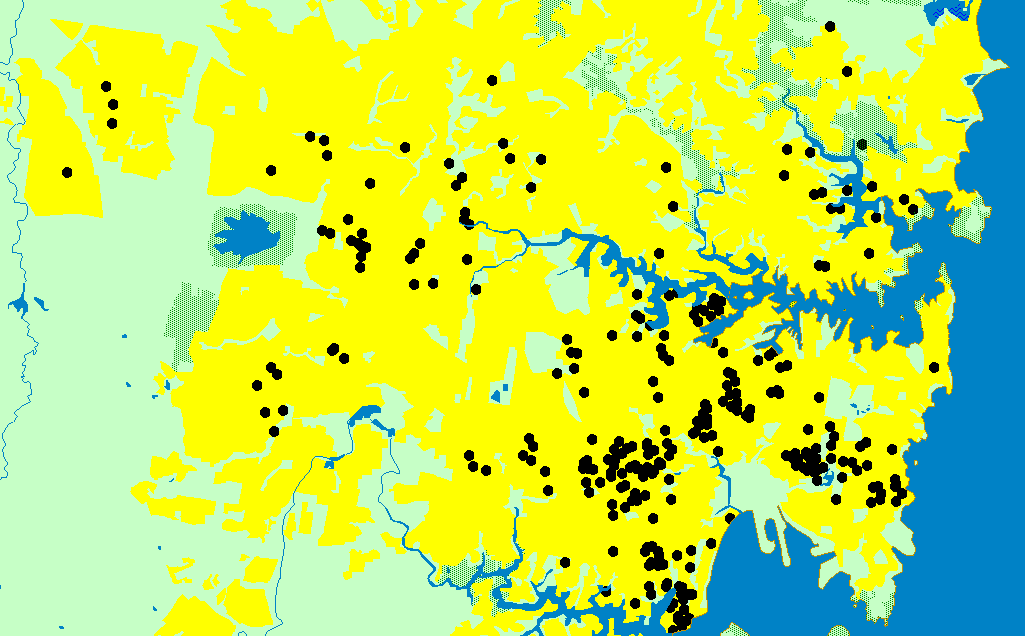

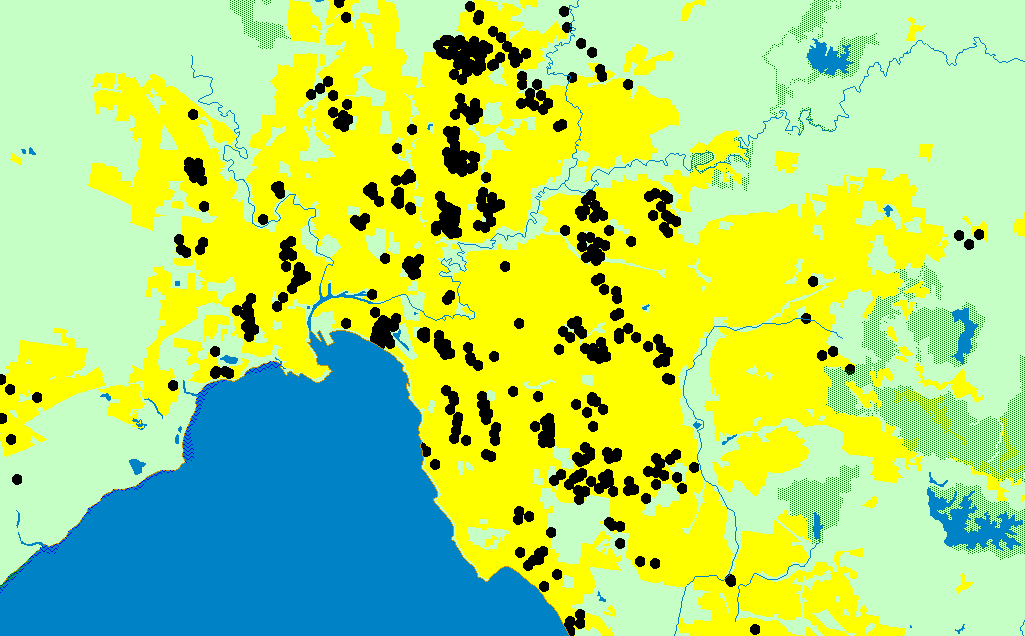

At the 2021 Australian census, 424,750 people stated that they had Greek ancestry (whether alone or in combination with another ancestry), comprising 1.7% of the Australian population. At the 2021 census, 92,314 Australian residents were born in Greece.

The largest concentration of Greek Australians is in the state of Victoria, which is often regarded as the heartland of the Greek Australian community. Victoria's capital Melbourne has the largest Greek Australian community in Australia.

The 2021 census showed that the following states had the largest numbers of people nominating Greek ancestry: Victoria (181,184), New South Wales (141,627), South Australia (40,704), Queensland (32,702), Western Australia (16,117).

One study investigating the 54 most common ethnic groups in Australia found that Greek Australians had a lower rate of intermarriage (marrying outside their ethnicity) than any other ethnicity in the first, second and third generations.

== Culture ==
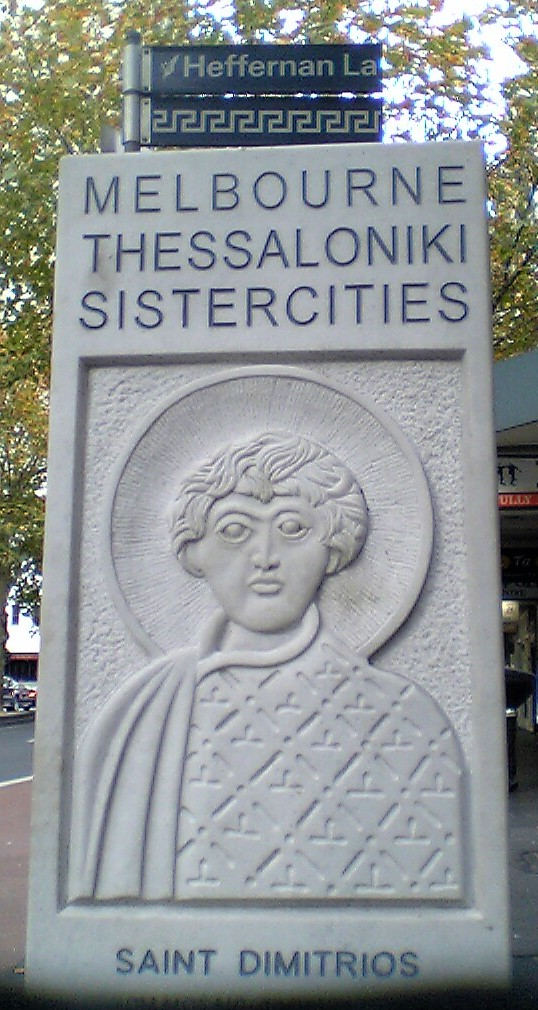

=== Religion ===
According to the 2016 Australian census, 91.4% of Australians with Greek ancestry are Christian, mainly Eastern Orthodox; however, minorities who belong to different Christian denominations like Catholics, Jehovah's Witnesses and Pentecostals also exist. Together, these other denominations make up 0.4% of the Greek Australian population. 5.6% identified as spiritual, secular or irreligious, and 2.6% did not answer the census question on religion. Greek Australians are predominantly Greek Orthodox. The largest religious body of Greek Orthodox Australians is the Greek Orthodox Archdiocese of Australia, with its headquarters at the Cathedral of The Annunciation of Our Lady in the inner Sydney suburb of Redfern.

Greek Australian demography by religion (note that it includes only Greek born in Greece and not australian with a Greek background)
Religious group	2021 (Note: Religious breakdown proportions based on "Greek" ethnic or cultural origin response on the 2021 census.)		2016 (Note: Religious breakdown proportions based on "Greek" ethnic or cultural origin response on the 2016 census.)		2011 (Note: Religious breakdown proportions based on "Greek" ethnic or cultural origin response on the 2011 census.)	
Religious group	Pop.	%	Pop.	%	Pop.	%
Eastern Orthodox	83,089 ▼	90.01% ▼	84,968 ▼	90.64% ▼	93,346	93.4%
Catholic	549 ▼	0.59%	565 ▼	0.6%	601	0.6%
Other Christian denomination	2,550 ▼	2.76%	2,587 ▲	2.76% ▲	2,149	2.15%
(Total Christian)	86,187 ▼	93.36% ▼	88,117 ▼	94% ▼	96,095	96.15%
Islam	340 ▲	0.37% ▲	309 ▼	0.33% ▼	427	0.43%
Irreligion	3,751 ▲	4.06% ▲	2,938 ▲	3.13% ▲	1,743	1.74%
Buddhism	39 ▲	0.04%	36▼	0.04% ▼	46	0.05%
Hinduism	11 ▲	0.01%	7 ▼	0.01%	10	0.01%
Judaism	7	0.01%	7 ▼	0.01%	10	0.01%
Other	49 ▲	0.05%	43 ▲	0.05% ▲	42	0.04%
Not stated	1,929 ▼	2.09% ▼	2,273 ▲	2.42% ▲	1,562	1.56%
Total Greek Australian population	92,314 ▼	100%	93,740 ▼	100%	99,938	100%

Greek Australian demography by religion (Ancestry included)
Religious group	2021		2016		2011	
Religious group	Pop.	%	Pop.	%	Pop.	%
Eastern Orthodox	383,544 ▲	74.18% ▼	376,022 ▼	76.56% ▼	387,940	81.12%
Catholic	26,251 ▲	5.08% ▲	24,482 ▲	4.98% ▲	22,774	4.76%
Other Christian denomination	27,007 ▼	5.22% ▼	27,646▲	5.63% ▲	26,609	5.56%
(Total Christian)	436,799 ▲	84.48% ▼	428,153 ▼	87.17% ▼	437,321	91.45%
Islam	1,943 ▲	0.38% ▲	1,602 ▲	0.33% ▲	1,263	0.26%
Irreligion	68,595 ▲	13.27% ▲	45,873 ▲	9.34% ▲	27,327	5.71%
Buddhism	678 ▼	0.13% ▼	770 ▲	0.16% ▲	741	0.15%
Hinduism	158 ▲	0.03%	147 ▲	0.03% ▲	100	0.02%
Judaism	393 ▲	0.08% ▲	344 ▲	0.07% ▲	291	0.06%
Other	658 ▲	0.13% ▲	561 ▼	0.11% ▼	567	0.12%
Not stated	7,837 ▼	1.52% ▼	13,708 ▲	2.79% ▲	10,591	2.21%
Total Greek Australian population	517,058 ▼	100%	491,168 ▼	100%	478,205	100%

=== Greek language ===
In 2016, the Greek language was spoken at home by 237,588 Australian residents, a 5.8% decrease from the 2011 census data. Greek is the seventh most commonly spoken language in Australia after English, Mandarin, Arabic, Cantonese, Vietnamese and Italian. The remainder of the ethnic Greek population in Australia mainly use English as their first language. Most Greek Australians speak the Greco-Australian dialect. Greco-Australian is an Australian-based dialect of Greek that is spoken by the local disapora, including by both Greek immigrants and Australians of Greek descent.

=== Media ===
The Greek language press began in Australia in 1913 when the first Greek weekly newspaper was published in Melbourne. In South Australia, the local Greek community published a short-lived newspaper called Okeanis (Oceania), around 1914 before it moved to Sydney. On 16 November 1926, George Marsellos and John Stilson published a broadsheet under the name Panellenios Keryx (Panhellenic Herald or The Greek Herald), becoming the second national Greek newspaper in Australia. In 1935 and 1936 a third newspaper, Pharos (Lighthouse), was published, and a number of short-lived titles were issued in the late 1960s, with the longest of these being Tachydromos (Mailman), founded in September 1968. In 1957, Hellenic/Greek language newspaper Neos Kosmos was founded by Dimitri Gogos, Bill Stefanou and Alekos Doukas, the latter also being an exceptionally well known author. Since 1994, a publication called Paroikiako Vema (Steps in the adopted Country) and printed in Renmark, has served the Greek community in rural South Australia.

Multicultural broadcaster SBS (Special Broadcasting Service) airs a Greek-language radio program every afternoon from 4 PM to 6 PM. The program features news, current affairs, music, interviews, and a talkback segment, where listeners can dial into the program from 5:30 PM onwards and express their opinion on a topic being focused on. Additionally, SBS also airs Greek public broadcaster ERT's Eidiseis news program every morning as part of their WorldWatch programming block.

== Notable individuals ==
=== Academic ===
- Nikos Athanasou – Professor of Musculoskeletal Pathology at Oxford University and a novelist.
- Nick Birbilis – Professor of Engineering / Executive Dean, Faculty of Science, Engineering and Built Environment Deakin University
- Adrian David Cheok – Professor of Pervasive Computing at City University London & Director of the Mixed Reality Lab
- Nicholas Doumanis – Assoc. Professor of History, at the University of New South Wales
- Nikolas Kompridis – Professorial Fellow at the University of Western Sydney in the School of Humanities & Communication Arts
- Michael Kyrios - Emeritus Professor at Flinders University; previous Vice President and Executive Dean, College of Education, Psychology and Social Work
- Christos Pantelis – Professor of Psychiatry, University of Melbourne
- George Paxinos - Professor of Neuroscience, University of New South Wales
- Maria Skyllas-Kazacos – Emeritus Professor at the University of New South Wales, chemical engineer best known for her pioneering work of the vanadium redox battery
- John Tasioulas – Director of Institute for Ethics in AI and Professor of Ethics and Legal Philosophy at University of Oxford and first Greek-Australian Rhodes Scholar

=== Art and design ===
- Con Chrisoulis – comic book creator
- Nonda Katsalidis – architect
- Marc Newson – industrial designer
- Polixeni Papapetrou – artist
- Paul Pholeros – architect
- Tony Rafty – caricaturist
- Stelarc (Stelios Arkadiou) – artist
- Christos Tsiolkas – writer
- Michael Zavros – artist/painter

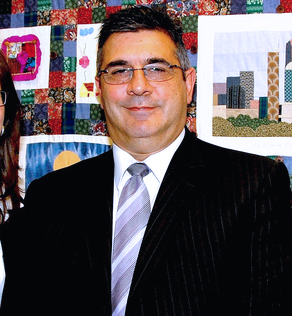
Andrew Demetriou, former chief executive of the Australian Football League (AFL)

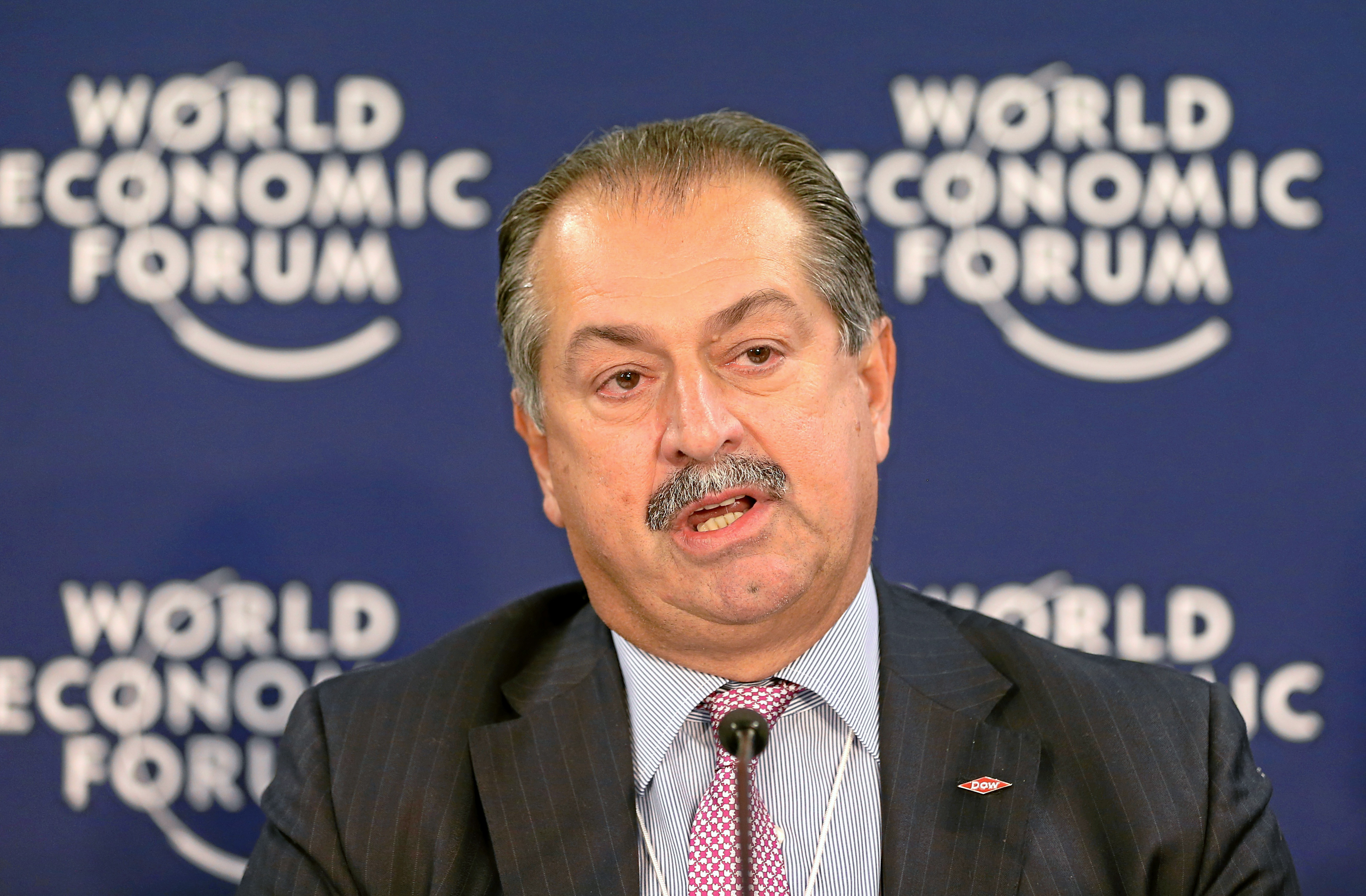
Andrew N. Liveris, CEO of Dow Chemical Company

=== Business ===
- Mark Bouris – managing director of Wizard
- George Calombaris – chef, former judge MasterChef Australia
- Con Constantine – former chairman, Newcastle United Jets
- Andrew Demetriou – chief executive, Australian Football League
- Harry Katsiabanis – founder of TaxiLink and StorageX
- Antony J. J. Lucas – businessman noted for his philanthropic activities
- Marinos Lucas – businessman, theatre company operator
- Andrew N. Liveris – CEO of Dow Chemical Company
- Kostas Makris – the richest Greek in Australia (in the top 30 of the richest residents in Australia)
- Theo Maras – property developer
- Nick Pappas – chairman, South Sydney Rabbitohs
- Nicholas Paspaley Senior and Paspaley family (Paspalis) – Paspaley dominate the pearling industry
- Geoff Polites – chief executive officer of Australian Jaguar Land RoverFPV President / Tickford managing director
- Nick Politis – car retailer and chairman of the Sydney Roosters rugby league club
- James Samios – Hon. MBE Museum of Contemporary Art, Circular Quay, Sydney
- Peter V'landys – chairman of the Australian Rugby League Commission

=== Fashion ===
- Christopher Chronis – fashion designer
- Napoleon Perdis – make-up artist
- Alex Perry – fashion designer

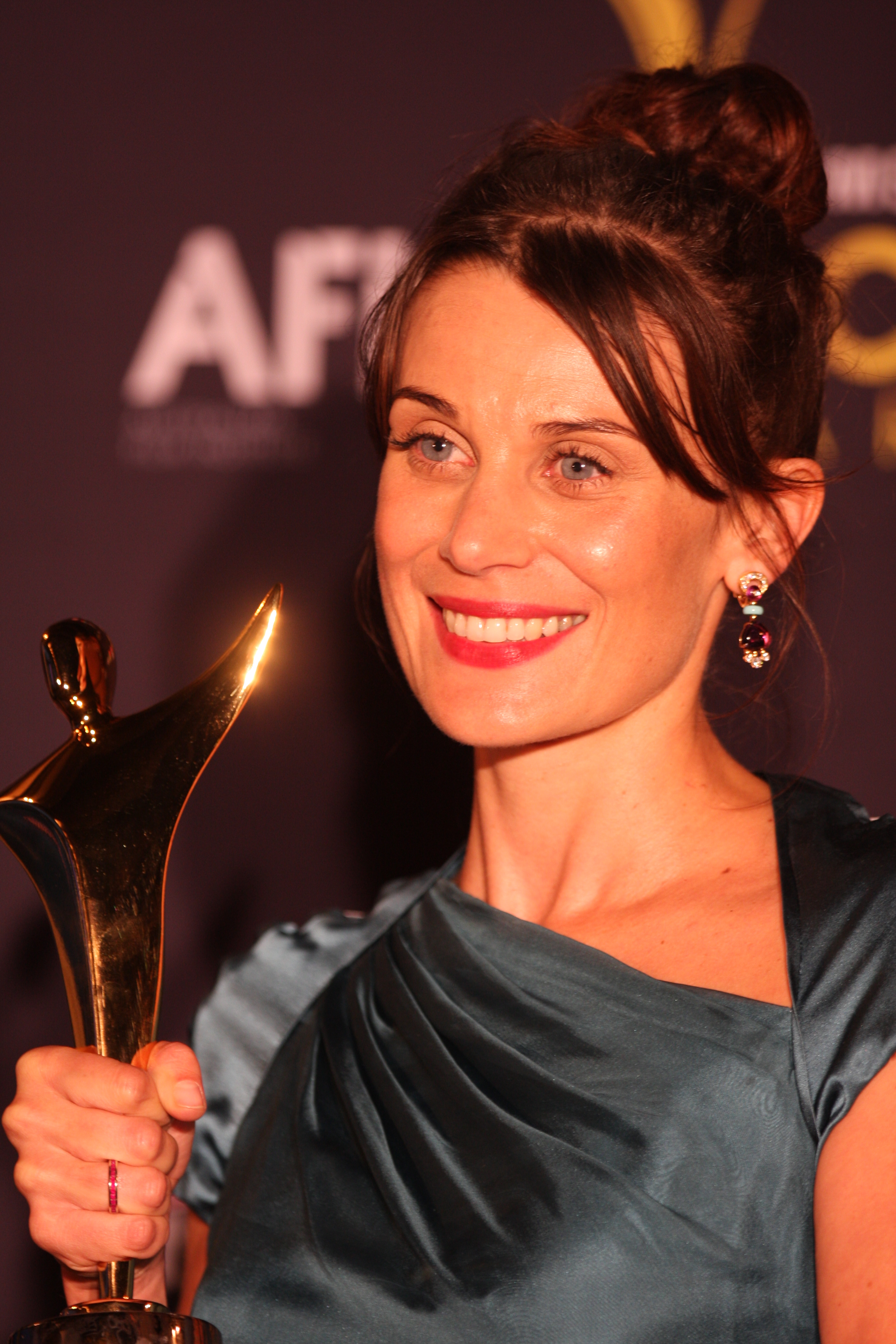
Diana Glenn, actress

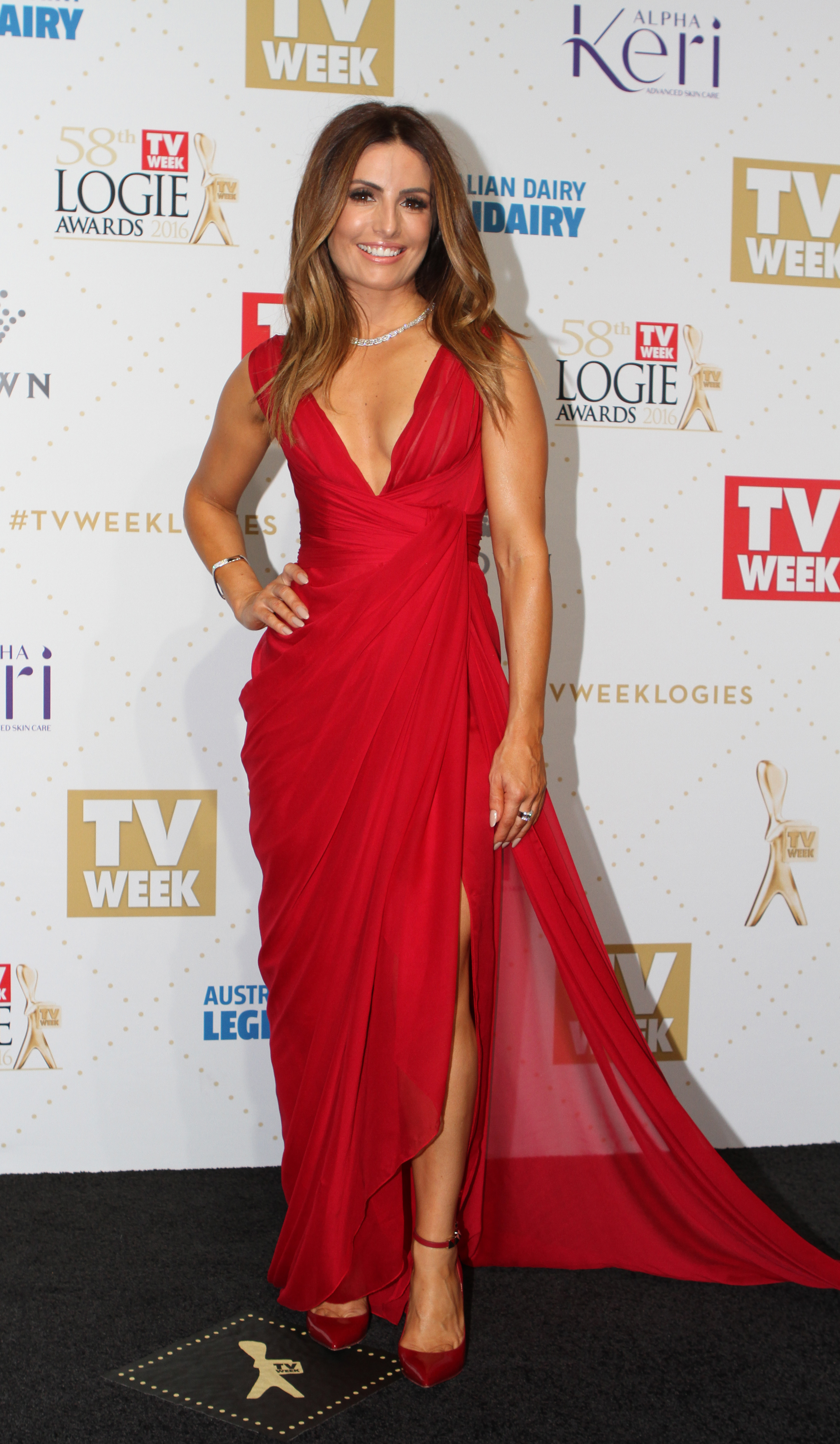
Ada Nicodemou, actress

=== Film, theatre, and television ===
- Peter Andrikidis – director and producer, Underbelly, G.P.
- Alex Andreas – actor, Fat Tony & Co.
- Alex Blias – actor, Home and Away
- Elena Carapetis – actress, Heartbreak High
- Gia Carides – actress, Austin Powers: International Man of Mystery, Brilliant Lies, My Big Fat Greek Wedding, Strictly Ballroom
- Zoe Carides – actress, Death in Brunswick, G.P.
- Wayne Coles-Janess – director and producer
- Chantal Contouri – actress, Number 96
- Mary Coustas – comedian and actress
- Alex Dimitriades – actor, The Heartbreak Kid, Heartbreak High, Head On, The Slap
- Rebekah Elmaloglou – actress, Home and Away and Neighbours
- Sebastian Elmaloglou – actor, Home and Away, brother of Rebekah
- Damien Fotiou – actor, Kangaroo Jack, Head On
- Nick Giannopoulos – actor, The Wog Boy, Acropolis Now and director
- Diana Glenn – actress
- George Houvardas – actor, Packed to the Rafters
- Hugh Jackman – actor, Paperback Hero, Australia, Logan, The Greatest Showman
- George Kapiniaris – actor, Acropolis Now and comedian
- Peter Kelamis – comedian
- Costas Kilias – actor
- Ana Kokkinos – director, The Secret Life of Us, Head On
- Katerina Kotsonis - actress, Neighbours
- Nico Lathouris – actor
- Costas Mandylor – actor, Saw, Picket Fences
- Louis Mandylor – actor, My Big Fat Greek Wedding
- Lex Marinos – actor, Kingswood Country, director, writer and broadcaster
- Harry Michaels – actor, Number 96, producer, Aerobics Oz Style, and director, Sports TV
- Bill Miller – director and producer
- George Miller – Academy Award-winning director and producer, Babe, Happy Feet, Mad Max: Fury Road

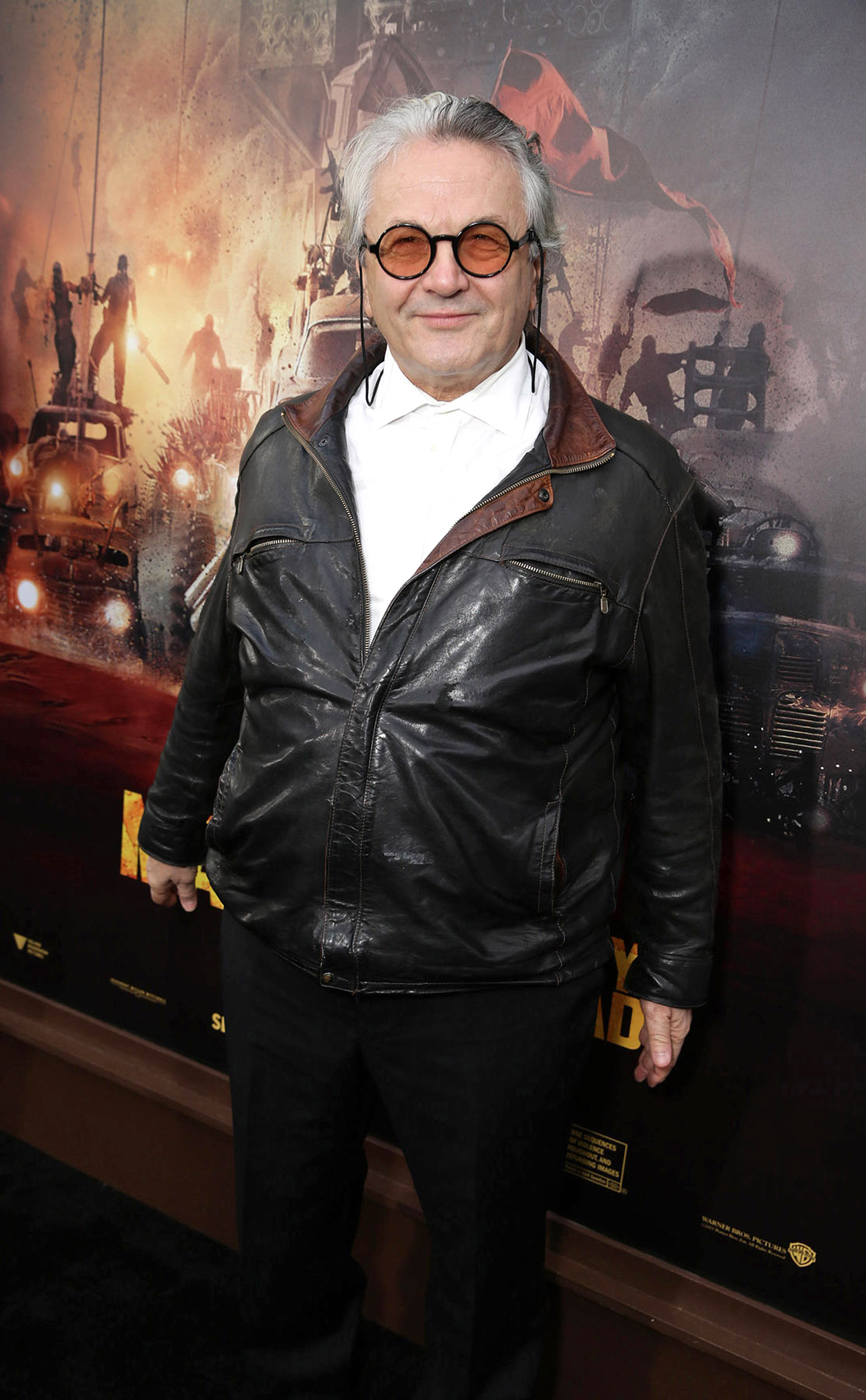
George Miller, director of Babe (1995), Happy Feet (2006), and Mad Max: Fury Road (2015)

- Ada Nicodemou – actress, Home and Away, Heartbreak High, Police Rescue
- Tony Nikolakopoulos – actor and director
- Socratis Otto – actor, known for television series Young Lions, and Wentworth
- Alex Papps – actor, Home and Away, The Henderson Kids and presenter, Play School
- Thaao Penghlis – actor, Days of Our Lives, General Hospital, Santa Barbara (TV series)
- Alex Proyas – director, I, Robot, Dark City, The Crow, Knowing

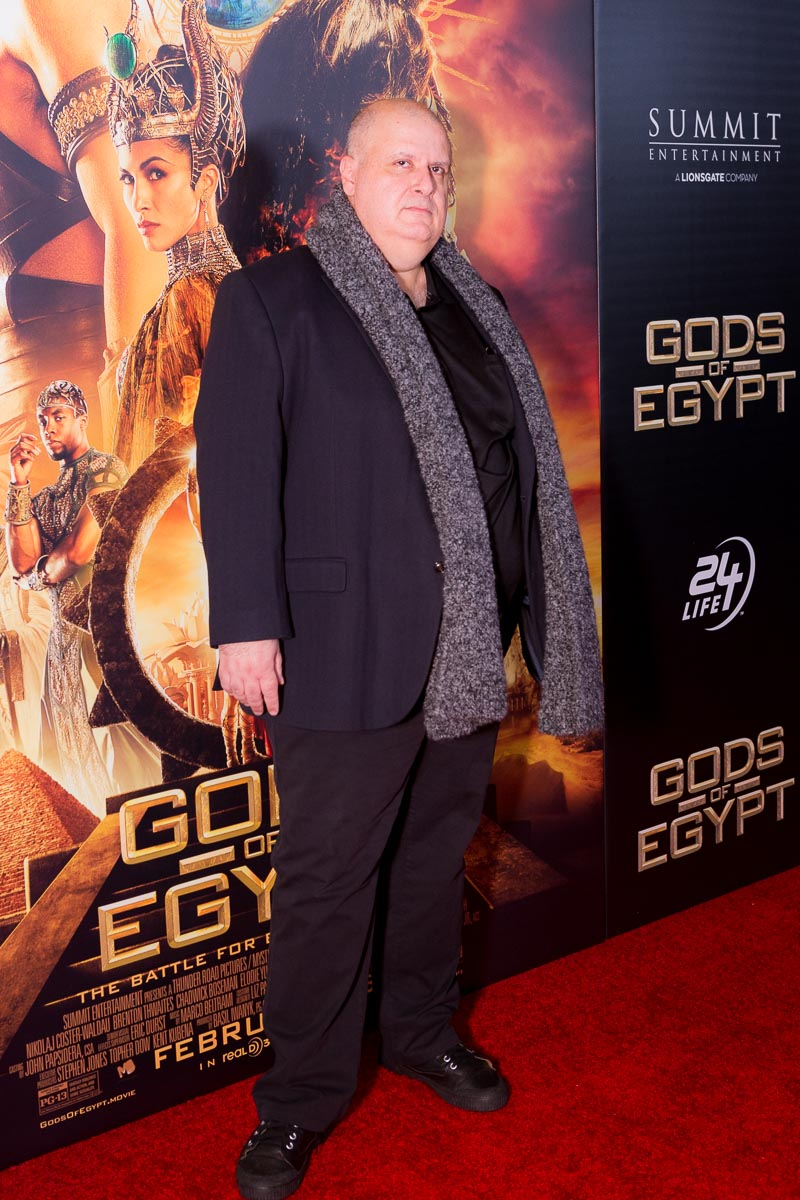
Alex Proyas, director of The Crow (1994) and I, Robot (2004)

- Jordan Raskopoulos – comedian and singer
- Steen Raskopoulos – actor and comedian
- Gina Riley – actress, Kath & Kim, comedian, entertainer and singer
- Nathan Saidden – comedian
- George Spartels – actor
- Nadia Tass – director, Malcolm, The Big Steal
- John Tatoulis – director and producer
- Maria Theodorakis – actress
- Alkinos Tsilimidos – director
- Antonis Tsonis - writer and director, Brando with a Glass Eye
- Olympia Valance – actress, Neighbours, Playing for Keeps and model
- Zoe Ventoura – actress, Packed to the Rafters
- Helen Zerefos – actress and cabaret singer

=== Journalism ===
- Nick Adams - also known as Nick Adamopoulos, US-based political commentator
- Dimitri Gogos – late editor, Neos Kosmos
- George Donikian – news presenter, Ten Network
- Peter Frilingos – sports journalist with the Daily Telegraph in Sydney, and broadcaster and commentator with the Continuous Call Team
- Helen Kapalos – journalist, reporter Sunday Night, Seven Network
- Patricia Karvelas – journalist, ABC
- Mary Kostakidis – journalist, SBS
- John Mangos – news presenter and journalist, Sky News Australia
- George Megalogenis – author and formerThe Australian newspaper journalist
- Harry Nicolaides – novelist
- Peter Peters – sports broadcaster and commentator
- Basil Zempilas – former television and radio presenter (and now politician)

=== Justice ===
- Chris Kourakis – Chief Justice of South Australia
- Emilios Kyrou – Justice of the Supreme Court of Victoria
- John Morris – Chief Justice of Tasmania (surname originally Moros)
- Andrew Kostopoulos – Justice of the Supreme and National Courts of Papua New Guinea

=== Music ===
- Peter Andre – singer, entertainer
- Alex Carapetis – drummer
- Kaz James – singer and DJ
- James Kannis – singer (Australian Idol)
- Chris Karan – jazz drummer (Dudley Moore Trio) and studio percussionist (Bob Marley & the Wailers)
- Vasilliki Karagiorgos (Vassy) – singer and songwriter
- John Lemmone – flute player and composer
- Orianthi Panagaris – guitarist/musician
- Sally Polihronas – singer (Bardot)
- Nick Skitz – deejay-producer
- Costas Tsicaderis – singer-songwriter
- Restricted - DJ and record producer

=== Politics and government ===
==== Federal ====
Federal government ministers:

- Nick Bolkus – Labor senator
- Michael McCormack – Nationals MP
- Peter Morris – Labor MP (brother of Allan Morris)
- Arthur Sinodinos – Liberal senator

Other members of parliament:

- Nick Dondas – Liberal MP
- Steve Georganas – Labor MP
- George Georges – Labor senator
- Petro Georgiou – Liberal MP
- Fiona Martin – Liberal MP
- Allan Morris – Labor MP (brother of Peter Morris)
- Andrew Theophanous – Labor MP
- Maria Vamvakinou – Labor MP
- Nick Xenophon – independent senator

==== State and territory ====
- Michael Costa – former Finance Minister, New South Wales
- Sophie Cotsis – politician, New South Wales
- Steve Dimopoulos – politician, Victoria
- Jim Fouras – politician, Queensland
- John Hatzistergos – Attorney General, New South Wales
- Steve Kamper – politician, New South Wales
- Peter Katsambanis – politician, Victoria and Western Australia
- Steve Kons – Deputy Premier, Tasmania
- Nicholas Kotsiras – Minister, Victoria
- Tom Koutsantonis – Minister for Trade, South Australia
- Ken Michael – governor of Western Australia
- Jenny Mikakos – former Health Minister, Victoria
- John Pandazopoulos – politician, Victoria
- Eleni Petinos – politician, New South Wales
- Olivia Savvas – politician, South Australia
- Nick Staikos – politician, Victoria
- Theo Theophanous – politician, Victoria (born Cyprus)
- Kat Theophanous – politician, Victoria
- Kon Vatskalis – politician, Northern Territory
- Basil Zempilas – Opposition Leader and former Lord Mayor of Perth (and former television and radio presenter), Western Australia

=== Religion ===
- Archbishop Stylianos Harkianakis – former Primate of the Greek Orthodox Archdiocese of Australia
- Archbishop Makarios Griniezakis – current Primate of the Greek Orthodox Archdiocese of Australia

=== Science and technology ===
- Manuel Aroney – organic chemist
- Gerasimos Danilatos – physicist, inventor of environmental scanning electron microscope
- Michael Kyrios – clinical psychologist
- George North (Tramountanas) – pastoralist, sheep farmer and first Greek to settle in South Australia in 1842
- Christos Pantelis – psychiatrist
- George Paxinos – Professor of Psychology at the University of New South Wales
- Maria Skyllas-Kazacos - Emeritus professor of chemical engineering at the University of New South Wales

=== Sport ===
==== Australian rules football ====
- Luke Beveridge – Melbourne, Footscray & St Kilda player
- Ang Christou – Carlton player
- Andrew Demetriou – North Melbourne & Hawthorn player (later League CEO)
- Josh Francou – Port Adelaide player
- Gary Frangalas – Sydney & Richmond player
- John Georgiades – Footscray player
- John Georgiou – St.Kilda player
- Con Gorozidis – St.Kilda & Footscray player
- Athas Hrysoulakis – Collingwood player
- Peter Kanis – Hawthorn player
- Arthur Karanicolas – North Melbourne player
- Patrick Karnezis – Brisbane & Collingwood player
- Paul Koulouriotis – Port Adelaide & Geelong player
- Spiro Kourkoumelis – Carlton & St Kilda player
- Anthony Koutoufides – Carlton player
- Angelo Lekkas – Hawthorn player
- Spiro Malakellis – Geelong player
- Tony Malakellis – Geelong & Sydney player
- Steve Malaxos – Hawthorn & West Coast player
- Daniel Metropolis – West Coast & Fremantle player
- Russell Morris – Hawthorn & St Kilda player
- Chris Pavlou – Carlton player
- Phillip Poursanidis – Carlton player
- Lou Richards – Collingwood player
- Ron Richards – Collingwood player
- John Rombotis – Fitzroy, Port Adelaide & Richmond player
- Tony Spassopoulos – Fitzroy player
- Jimmy Toumpas – Melbourne & Port Adelaide player
- Jason Traianidis – St Kilda player
- Zeno Tzatzaris – Footscray player
- David Zaharakis – Essendon player

==== Boxing and kickboxing ====
- Evangelos Goussis – Kickboxer and Boxer, convicted murderer
- George Kambosos Jr. – Professional boxer
- Michael Katsidis – Professional Boxer, former WBA and WBO lightweight champion
- Stan Longinidis – Kickboxer, former World Kickboxing Champion
- Tosca Petridis – Kickboxer, former World Kickboxing Champion

==== Cricket ====
- Jason Gillespie – cricket coach and retired Australia international cricketer
- Peter Hatzoglou – Melbourne Renegades cricketer
- Sam Konstas – Australia international cricketer
- Blake Nikitaras - Sydney thunder cricketer
- Steve Nikitaras - Former WA cricketer
- Marcus Stoinis – Australia international cricketer

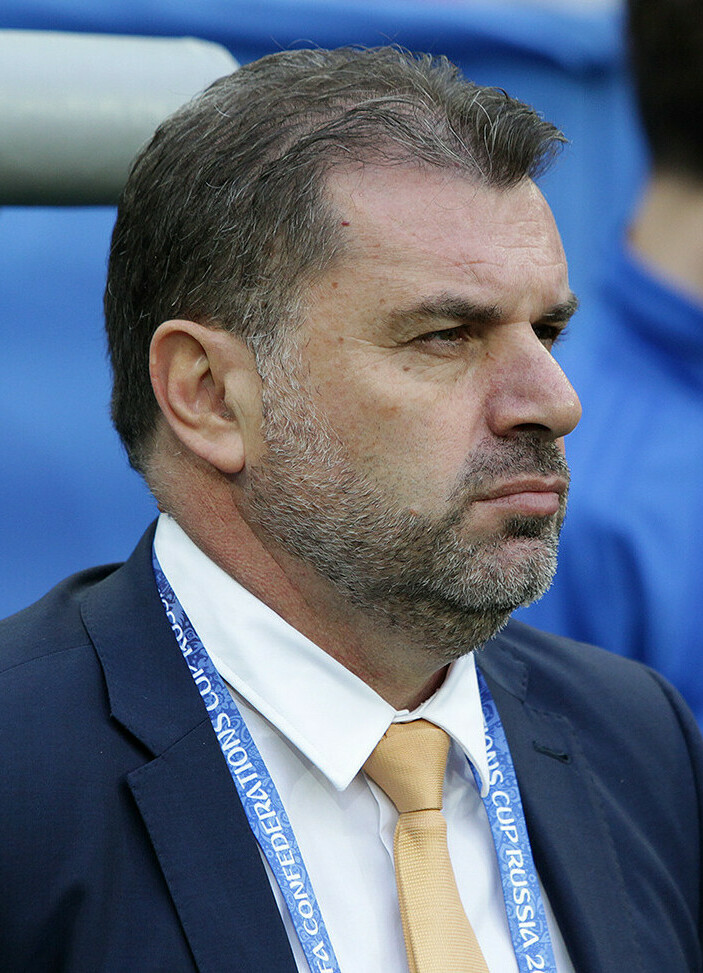
Ange Postecoglou, soccer manager and former player

==== Soccer ====
- John Anastasiadis – former player of Heidelberg United, PAOK, South Melbourne and Yarraville Glory. Represented the Socceroos at U21 level. Coached Yarraville Glory, South Melbourne, Oakleigh Cannons and is current coach of Bentleigh Greens.
- Panos Armenakas – player, Udinese Calcio
- Con Blatsis – former player of South Melbourne, Derby County, Sheffield Wednesday (on loan), Colchester United, Kocaelispor and St Patrick's Athletic. Represented the Socceroos at U20, U23 and senior level.
- Con Boutsianis – former player of South Melbourne, Heidelberg United, Collingwood Warriors, Bentleigh Greens, Perth Glory, Bolton Wanderers, Bulleen Zebras, Oakleigh Cannons, Essendon United and Malvern City. He represented the Socceroos at senior level.
- Dean Bouzanis – player Reading, Melbourne City and former Liverpool FC
- Jason Davidson – player Eupen, Melbourne Victory and former Socceroos
- Chris Kalantzis – player
- Evan Kostopoulos – player, Adelaide United
- Stan Lazaridis – player, Perth Glory and Socceroos
- Apostolos Stamatelopoulos – player, Motherwell and former player of Adelaide United, Newcastle Jets and Western United
- Michalis 'Mike' Mandalis - player, one of Australia's all-time greats South Melbourne and Melbourne Hakoah
- Lucas Pantelis – former player of Adelaide City, Parramatta Power and Adelaide United
- Jim Patikas – former player, first Australian participant in UEFA Champions League, former Socceroos
- Ange Postecoglou – coach Socceroos, Celtic and Spurs, former player
- Peter Raskopoulos - player, Sydney Olympic FC
- Nick Theodorakopoulos – coach
- Michael Theoklitos – former player of Brisbane Roar, Melbourne Victory, South Melbourne
- Michael Valkanis – coach, Melbourne City and Greece national football team assistant
- Helen Caceres – player
- Andy Vlahos – player
- Charlie Yankos – former Socceroos captain
- Terry Antonis – player, St George FC and former player of Western Sydney Wanderers
- Apostolos Giannou – player, Kerala Blasters
- Avraam Papadopoulos – player, Australian born Greece national football team member
- Jesse Makarounas – player, Bayside Argonauts and former player of Melbourne Victory
- Dimitri Petratos – player, Mohun Bagan Super Giant
- Kosta Petratos – player, NWS Spirit
- Maki Petratos – player, Bentleigh Greens
- Chris Ikonomidis – player, Macarthur FC
- Anthony Lesiotis – player, Heidelberg United

==== Mixed martial arts ====
- George Sotiropoulos – former UFC mixed martial artist
- Alexander Volkanovski – UFC mixed martial artist

==== Rugby league ====
- Braith Anasta – player, Canterbury-Bankstown Bulldogs, Sydney Roosters
- Jason Demetriou - player/coach
- George Gatis – player, New Zealand Warriors
- Steve Georgallis – player, Western Suburbs Magpies, coach
- Michael Korkidas – player, Salford City Reds
- Nick Kouparitsas – player, Canterbury Bulldogs
- Glenn Lazarus – player Canberra Raiders, Brisbane Broncos and Melbourne Storm
- Billy Magoulias — player, Cronulla Sharks
- George Peponis – player, Canterbury-Bankstown Bulldogs, former Australian captain
- Peter Peters - player, Manly-Warringah
- Willie Peters – player, South Sydney Rabbitohs
- Jim Serdaris – player, South Sydney, Canterbury-Bankstown Bulldogs
- John Skandalis – player, Western Suburbs Magpies, Wests Tigers, Huddersfield Giants
- Jason Stevens – player, St-George Illawarra Dragons, Cronulla-Sutherland Sharks
- Justin Tsoulos – player, Parramatta Eels
- Arthur Kitinas – player/coach, South Sydney Sydney Roosters

==== Sailing ====
- Edward Psaltis – sailor

==== Shooting ====
- Michael Diamond – shooter – Olympic gold medallist, Sydney 2000

==== Skateboarding ====
- Tas Pappas – former World No.1
- Ben Pappas

==== Skiing ====
- Lydia Lassila – skier

==== Tennis ====
- Mark Philippoussis – player
- Nick Kyrgios – player
- Thanasi Kokkinakis – player

==== Weightlifting ====
- Robert Kabbas - athlete
- Bill Stellios - athlete

==== Wrestling ====
- Tony Kontellis – professional wrestler
- Spiros Manousakis (Spiros Arion) – wrestler

== See also ==
- Australia–Greece relations
- Australians in Greece
- Cypriot Australians
- European Australians
- Europeans in Oceania
- Greek Cypriots
- Greek New Zealanders
- Greek Orthodox churches in New South Wales
- Greeks
- Immigration to Australia
- Neos Kosmos

== Bibliography ==
- Tamis, Anastasios (2005). The Greeks in Australia. Cambridge University Press. ISBN 0-521-54743-1
- Gilchrist, Hugh (1992), Australians and Greeks Volume I: The Early Years, Brown, Prior, Anderson Pty. Ltd., ISBN 978-1-875684-01-4
- Alexakis, Effy and Janiszewski, Leonard (1998). In Their Own Image: Greek-Australians. Hale & Iremonger Pty Limited. ISBN 0-86806-655-9
- Alexakis, Effy and Janiszewski, Leonard (1995). Images of Home: Mavri Xenitia. Hale & Iremonger Pty Limited. ISBN 0-86806-560-9
- Alexakis, Effy and Janiszewski, Leonard (2013). Selling an American Dream: Australia's Greek Cafe. Macquarie University. ISBN 9781741383959
- Alexakis, Effy and Janiszewski, Leonard (2016). Greek Cafes & Milk Bars of Australia. Halstead Press. ISBN 9781925043181
