= Chronis =

Chronis can be a first name. Notable people with the first name include:

- Chronis Aidonidis (born 1928), Greek singer
- Chronis Exarhakos (1932–1984), Greek actor

Chronis can be a surname. Notable people with the surname include:

- Andreas Chronis (born 1989), Greek-American soccer player
- Christopher Chronis (born 1961), Australian fashion designer
- Iason Chronis (born 1980), Dutch DJ & producer (known professionally as Mason)
- Katherine Chronis, American performance artist
- Panayiotis Chronis (born 1984), Greek football player
- Sarah Chronis (born 1986), Dutch actress
