= Australia–Greece relations =

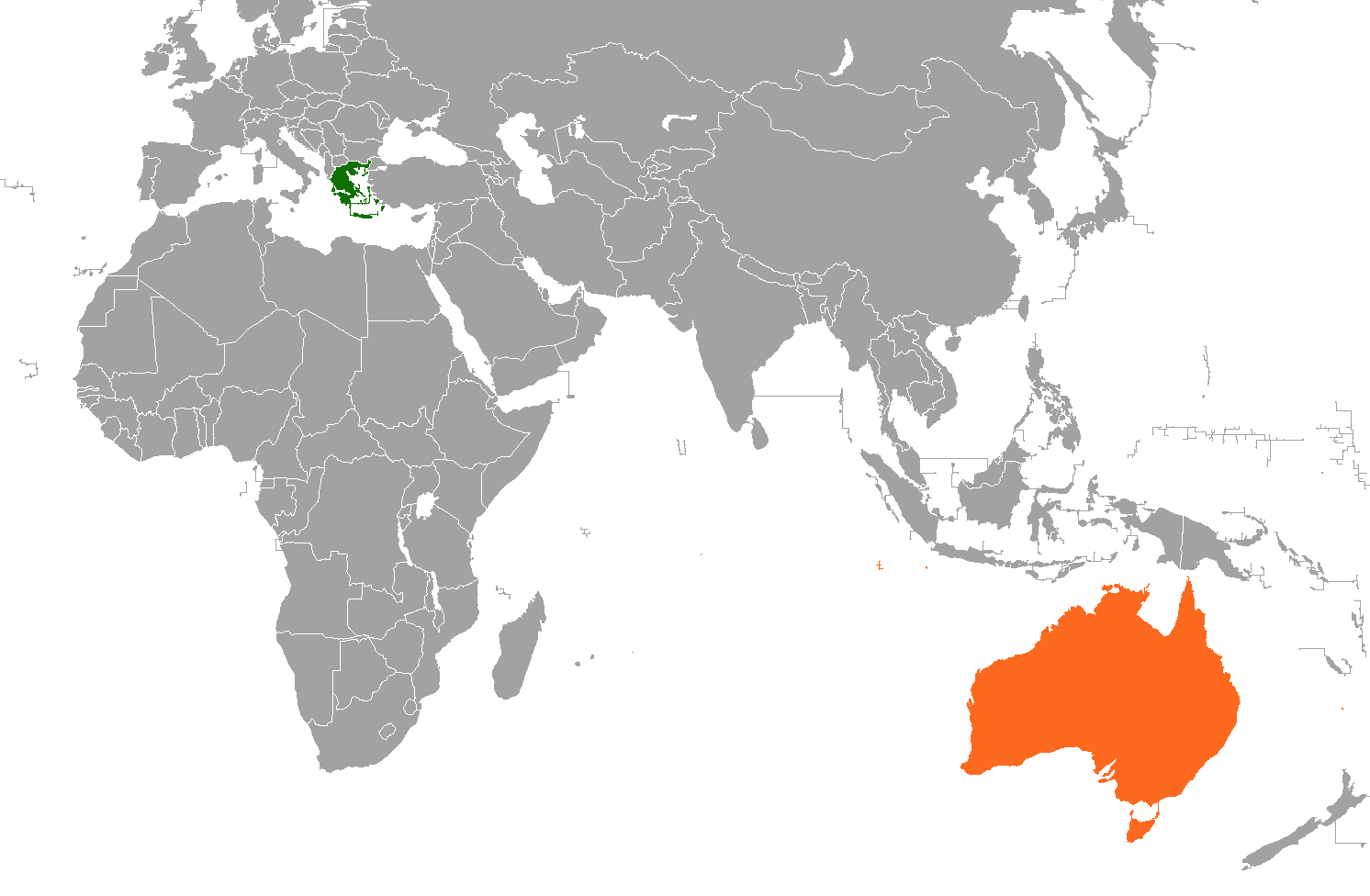

- Greece: Australia

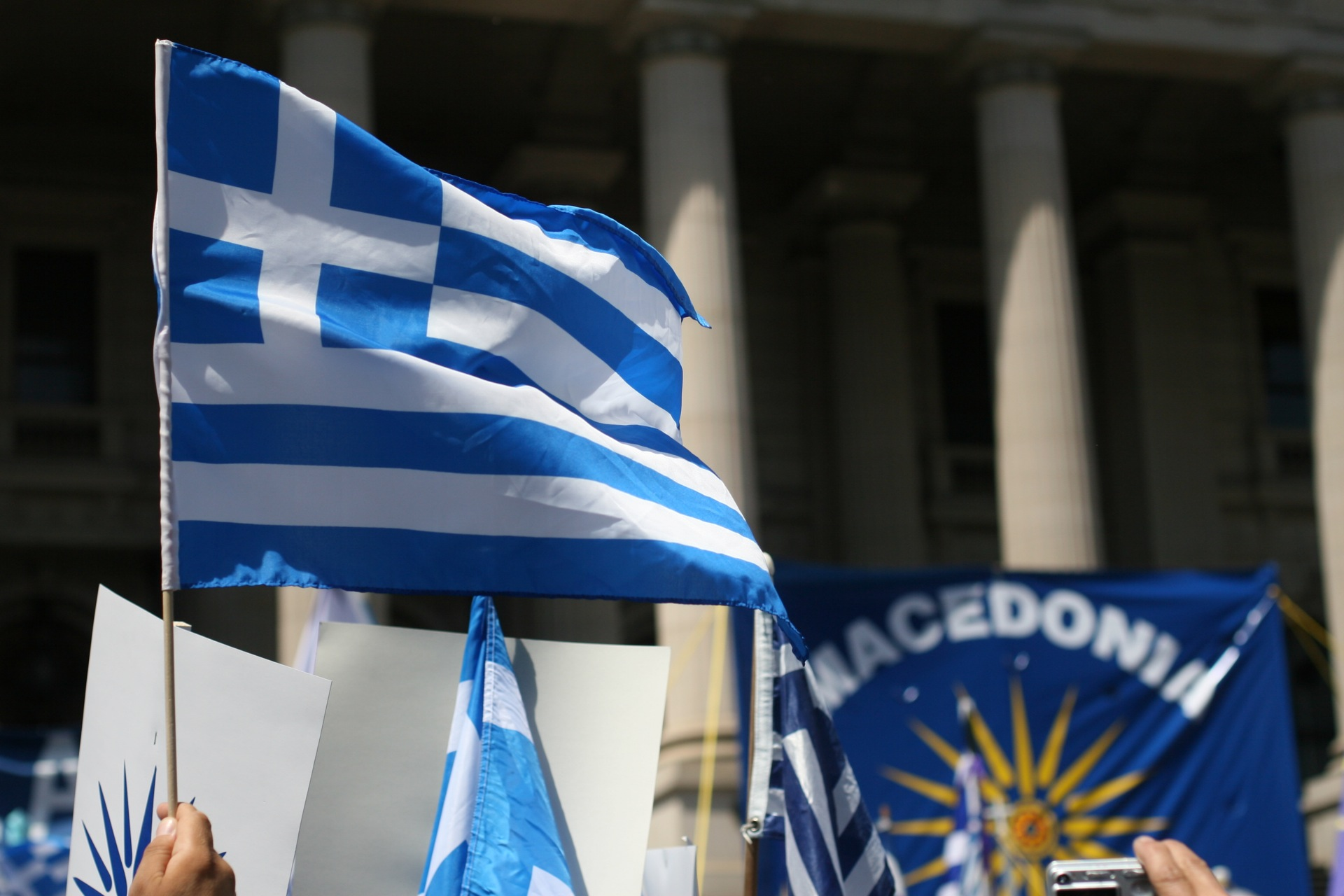
Macedonia is Greece rally in Melbourne

Foreign relations exist between Australia and Greece. Relations between the two states are close: the countries were allies during both World Wars and the Korean War. During World War II, Australian forces took part in the Battle of Greece and the Battle of Crete. There is a large Greek community in Australia (dating from the 1950s and 1960s). Each country has an embassy in the other's capital. Greece also has consulates general in Sydney, Melbourne and Adelaide, as well as a consulate in Perth, honorary consulates general in Brisbane and Darwin, and honorary consulates in Newcastle and Hobart. Both countries are full members of the Organisation for Economic Co-operation and Development.

Australia and Greece have a close bilateral relationship based on historical ties and the rich contribution of Greek Australians to Australian society. In 2019, the export of Australian services to Greece was valued at $92 million, while services imports from Greece totalled $750 million. Australia's stock of investment in Greece in 2019 totalled $481 million. Investment in Australia from Greece was $192 million.

== List of bilateral visits ==
The following state visits have occurred:

- March 1955, Prime Minister of Australia Robert Menzies visited Greece
- June 2002, President of Greece Konstantinos Stephanopoulos visited Australia
- July 2002, Prime Minister of Australia John Howard visited Athens
- April 2005, Prime Minister of Australia John Howard visited Greece
- May 2007, Greek Prime Minister, Kostas Karamanlis and Greek Foreign Minister Dora Bakoyannis and a delegation of Greek officials and media visited Australia

== List of bilateral treaties and agreements ==
23 Australia–Greece bilateral treaties covering extradition, taxation, trade, War and its aftermath, social security and other matters have been agreed between the two countries.

2 agreements are pending:

- bilateral Social Security Agreement
- Greek–Australian bilateral Agreement on Holidays with Employment Rights

== Economic and trade relations ==
Monthly value of Australian merchandise exports to Greece (A$ millions) since 1988

Monthly value of Greek merchandise exports to Australia (A$ millions) since 1988

Bilateral economic relations between both countries are at a very low level and there are significant fluctuations in the volume of trade. According to data by the National Statistical Service of Greece, the total volume of trade between the two countries rose by 34.05% reaching 143.228 million Euros.

== See also ==
- Foreign relations of Australia
- Foreign relations of Greece
- Australia-EU relations
- Greek Australian
- Australians in Greece
- List of ambassadors of Greece to Australia
- Greek community of Melbourne
