= Endorestiform nucleus =

Neuron cluster near the cerebellum

Endorestiform nucleus is a nucleus present within the inferior cerebellar peduncle of human brains. It was discovered by George Paxinos and his team at Neuroscience Research Australia (NeuRA). Paxinos had suspected the existence of the endorestiform nucleus for approximately 30 years. However, it was not until 2018 that he has been able to confirm its presence due to advances in staining and imaging techniques. The region is not present in rhesus monkeys and may be unique to humans.

== Etymology ==
The name endorestiform is derived from the fact that the nucleus is present within (endo) the inferior cerebellar peduncle (a.k.a. restiform body).

== Function ==
Given that the endorestiform nucleus is located in the inferior cerebellar peduncle, it is thought that it might be involved in fine motor control. According to George Paxinos, its discovery might help researchers find cures for disorders such as Parkinson's disease and motor neuron disease.

== See also ==
- Rosehip neuron, a type of neuron discovered in 2018 which is present uniquely in human.
