= Dimitris Tsaloumas =

Greek-Australian poet

Dimitris Tsaloumas (13 October 1921 – 4 February 2016) was a Greek-Australian poet.

== Biography ==
Tsaloumas was born in Greece on the island of Leros, one of the Dodecanese islands, which were then under Italian rule (from 1912 to 1947). Consequently, his formal education was in Italian. His later schooling was on Rhodes, where he also studied the violin. He came of age during the Italian and German occupation of Greece, and took part in the resistance, acting as a courier. In Greece, before migrating to Australia, he published two collections of poetry, one of which was printed with the help of the English writer Lawrence Durrell, who met Tsaloumas on Rhodes and was impressed with his work.

He left for Australia in 1952 because of political persecution and earned a living by teaching. He started writing again (in Greek) and had several volumes published. He became known to English readers when a selection of his Greek poems was published in the bilingual edition of The Observatory in 1983. The first poems he wrote entirely in English were published in 1988 in Falcon Drinking. After that he published several more volumes of English-language poetry. He often returned to Greece, spending much of his time on Leros.

Among the prizes he has received for his writing are the National Book Council Award (1983), the Patrick White Award (1994) and an Emeritus Award from the Literature Board of the Australia Council for outstanding and lifelong contribution to Australian literature (2002). Four of Tsaloumas' poems, "I Took the Path to the Mountain", "The Foreigner", "The Pomegranate", and "Letters Bearing Bad Tidings", were set to music by the Greek-Australian songwriter Costas Tsicaderis. The latter two were published in 1985 on Live at The Boite. A studio version of "The Pomegranate" was included in the anthology of Greek Australian songs and music In a Strange Land. "I Took the Path to the Mountain" and "The Foreigner" is on the album by Irine Vela and Costas Tsicaderis, Greek 3CR.

== Bibliography ==
Books of Poems in Greek by Dimitris Tsaloumas

- Επιστολή στον ταξιδεμένο φίλο (Rhodes, 1949)
- Τρόποι γαλήνης (Athens: Ικαρος, 1950)
- Ανάσταση 1967 (Melbourne: Αρίων, 1974).
- Παρατηρήσεις υποχονδριακού (Athens, 1974).
- Το σπίτι με τους ευκάλυπτους (AKE, 1975)
- Ο άρρωστος μπαρμπέρης και άλλα πρόσωπα (Athens: Ικαρος, 1979).
- Το σπίτι με τους ευκάλυπτους, 2nd edition (Thessaloniki: Νέα Πορεία, 1980).
- Ο γιος του κυρ-Σακή (Athens, 1979).
- Το βιβλίο των επιγραμμάτων (Thessaloniki: Νέα Πορεία, 1981; 2nd ed. 1982).
- Το ταξίδι (2 volumes, Athens: Εκδόσεις Σοκόλη & Melbourne: Owl Publishing, 1995).
- Δίφορος καρπός (Melbourne: Owl Publishing, 2001).

Bilingual Editions

- The Observatory, trans. Philip Grundy (University of Queensland Press, 1983, 1984, 1991).
- The Book of Epigrams, trans. Philip Grundy (University of Queensland Press, 1985)

Books of Poems in English by Dimitris Tsaloumas

- Falcon Drinking (University of Queensland Press, 1988)
- Portrait of a Dog (University of Queensland Press, 1991)
- The Barge (University of Queensland Press, 1993)
- The Harbour (University of Queensland Press, 1998).
- Six Improvisations On The River (Nottingham: Shoestring Press, 1996).
- Stoneland Harvest: New & Selected Poems (Nottingham: Shoestring Press, 1999, 2004).
- Dimitris Tsaloumas: New & Selected Poems (University of Queensland Press, 2000)
- Helen of Troy and Other Poems (University of Queensland Press, 2007).

Anthologies by Dimitris Tsaloumas

- Σύγχρονη αυστραλιανή ποίηση, ed. & trans. by Dimitris Tsaloumas (Thessaloniki: Νέα Πορεία, 1986)
- Contemporary Australian Verse, selected & trans. by Dimitris Tsaloumas (University of Queensland Press, 1986).

Books about Dimitris Tsaloumas

- Con Castan, Dimitris Tsaloumas: Poet (Melbourne: Elikia Books, 1990)
- Helen Nickas (ed.) Dimitris Tsaloumas, a voluntary exile: selected writings on his life and work (Melbourne: Owl Publishing, 1999)
