= Harry Katsiabanis =

Australian entrepreneur and public transport operator

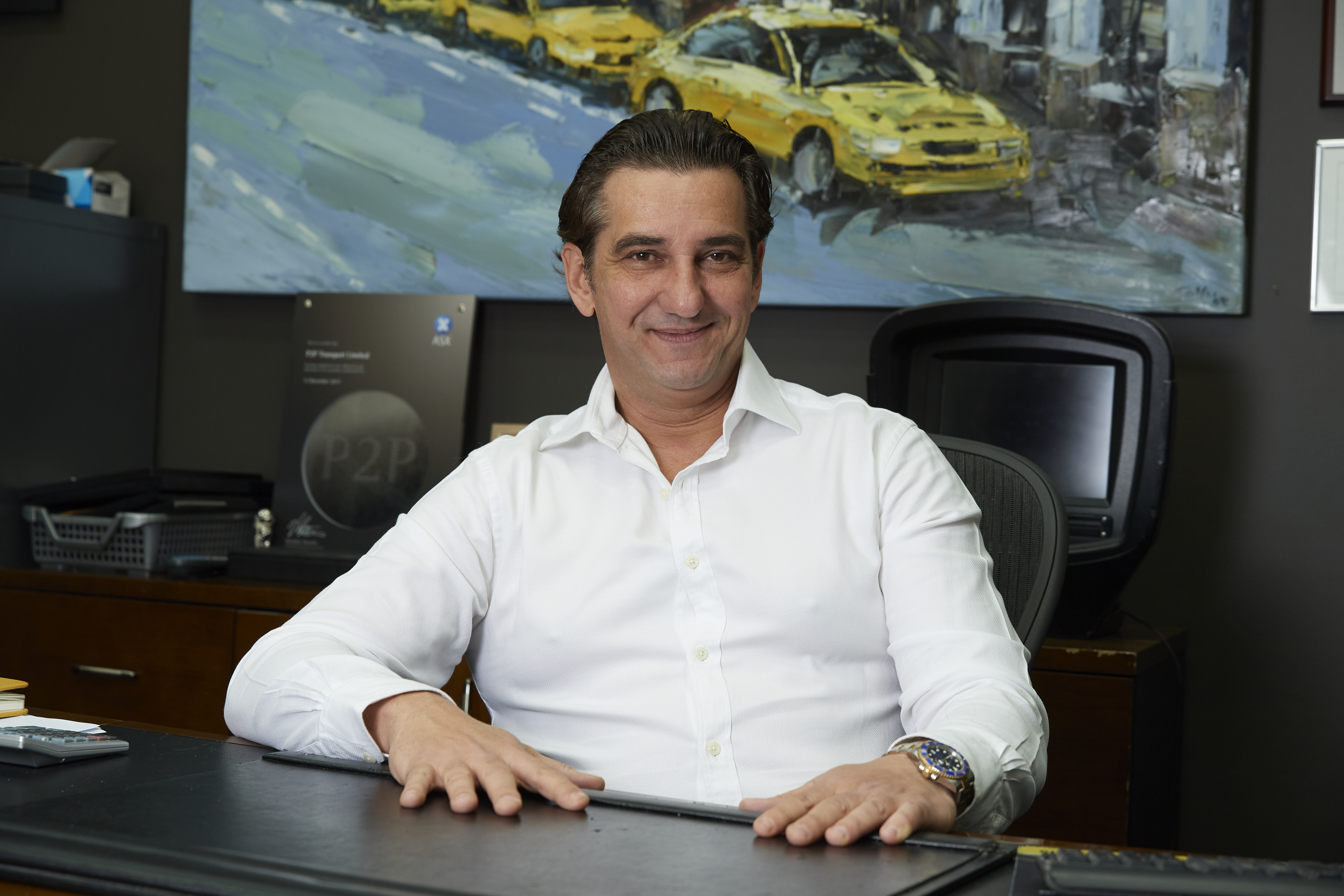
- Education: Swinburne University of Technology
- Occupations: Australian entrepreneur, public transport operator, self storage developer and operator, executive coaching
- Years active: 1988-present
- Known for: Founding StorageX, CABiT and TaxiLink
- Website: www.storagex.com.au

Harry Katsiabanis is an Australian entrepreneur and public transport operator known for founding self storage company StorageX, TaxiLink, CABiT, Ride247 and P2P Transport.

== Early life and education ==
Harry Katsiabanis attended Melbourne High School and La Trobe University. He worked as a real estate agent for a decade before deciding to enter the taxicab industry. He began driving taxi cabs in 1988, and bought his first taxi license at the age of 21. Katsiabanis attended Swinburne University of Technology from 2011 to 2013, and graduated with a master's degree.

== Career ==
=== TaxiLink, TaxiEpay, Greek immigration ===
Katsiabanis founded the Melbourne-based taxi network Taxi Link in 2003 and is the company's executive director. e also created TaxiEpay, an EFTPOS system, that same year. Katsiabanis is the spokesperson for Taxi Industry Stakeholders Victoria, and became known for opposing Allan Fels' position in the 2011 Taxi Industry Inquiry, and protesting government plans to reduce the value of taxi licenses.

In 2012, Katsiabanis started an initiative to encourage Greeks to immigrate to Australia and work as taxi drivers in the Melbourne-area during the Greek financial crisis. The initiative was motivated by changes in Australian immigration laws which reduced immigration from India, thereby creating a shortage of taxi cab drivers in Australia. That same year, Katsiabanis founded the Australian Taxi Academy, offering free training and seminars to Greeks who enrolled in the program. In June 2012, Katsiabanis he a series of seminars about the initiative in Athens.

In May 2013, it was reported Katsiabanis and two other taxi operators bought the rights to Taxiplon, a Greek taxi-booking app.

In November 2013, Katsiabanis announced his plans to launch Taxi Link Pink, a pink fleet of cabs driven by women for female passengers. He stated that the initiative was inspired by an article in The Age, which reported on sexual harassment by cab drivers in Victoria.

=== CABiT ===
In 2014, Katsiabanis founded CABiT, an Australian vehicle for hire service that combined the fleets of Taxi Link, Ambassador, Cabways, and Kensington Taxis. Katsiabanis has stated that the company was modelled after the Indonesian taxi group Blue Bird. On August 24, 2015, CABiT launched a fleet of green-painted, hybrid cars.

=== P2P, Ride247 ===
Katsiabanis co-founded P2P Transport, a vehicle rental company, in 2017. He initially raised $30 million in funding for the company with a group of investors in mid-2017, and the company opened on the Australian Securities Exchange in December.

In 2018, Katsiabanis announced plans to launch Ride247, a mobile phone app which would allow users to book taxis, rideshare cars, and limousines.

=== StorageX ===
Katsiabanis is currently the director of StorageX, an Australian self storage company based in Huntingdale, Victoria, which he founded in 2022 with his family. In 2023, he appeared on Swinburne University's Innovation and Ideas series where he discussed his decision to found StorageX after COVID-19 pandemic impacted the taxi industry. It won the Rising Star Award at the Monash Business Awards in 2023.

== Personal life ==
Harry Katsiabanis is an Australian of Greek descent.
