= Harry Michaels =

Greek Australian actor and producer

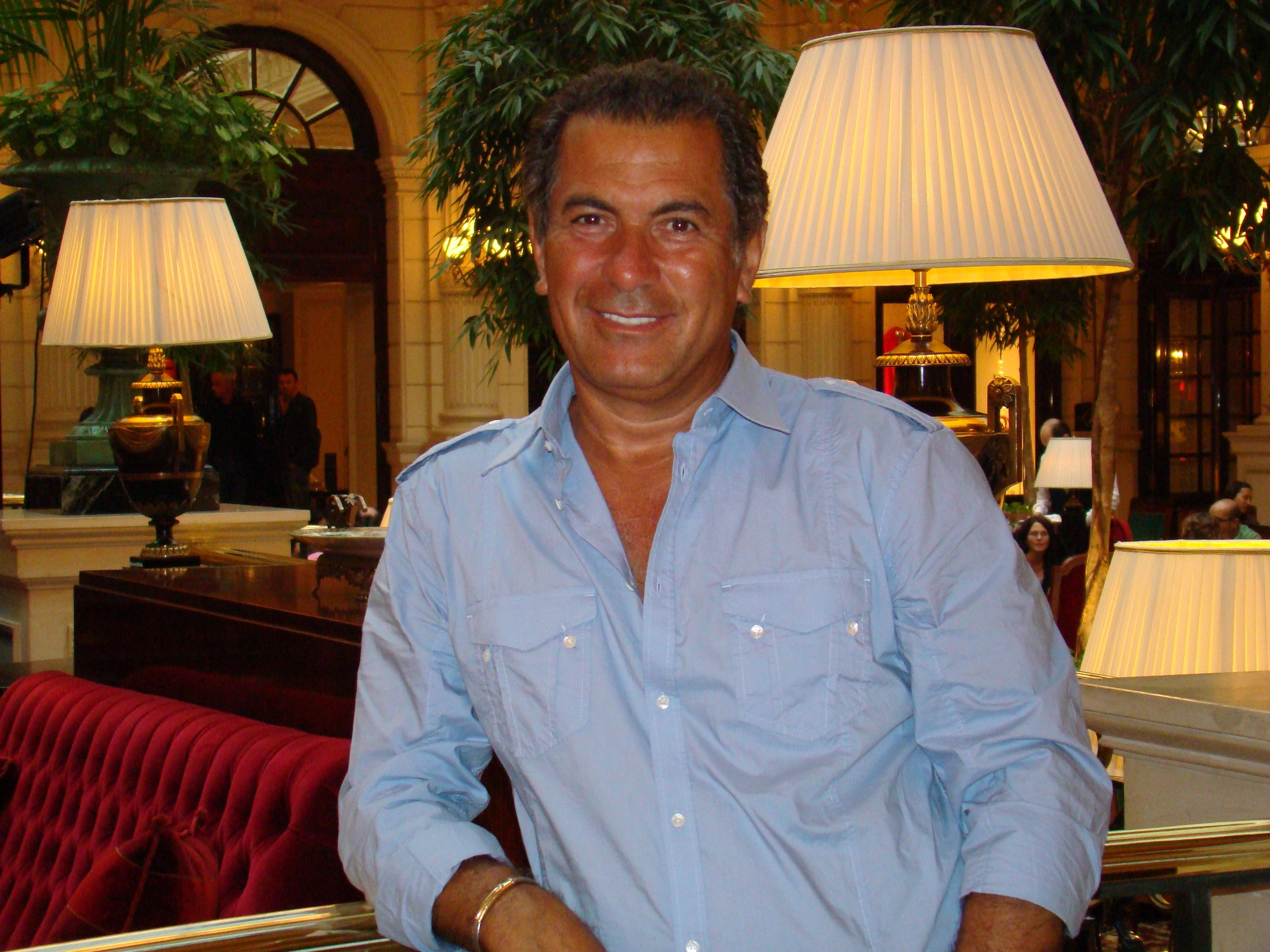
- A portrait of Harry Michaels
- Born: 1948 (age 77–78)
- Occupations: Entrepreneur; actor; director; producer; soccer player
- Awards: Order of Australia (OAM)

Harry Michaels is a Greek Australian entrepreneur, active in the soccer and television industries as an actor, director and producer.

== Biography ==
=== Early life and career ===
Harry Michaels was born in 1948 of Greek Cypriot descent and first became popular athrough his role in the local TV series Number 96 in 1976 after being brought into the series by Cash-Harmon and writer David Sale to play a young Italian working in the deli with Arnold Feather (Jeff Kevin). He had previously appeared in that series in a guest role, playing a different character, after which when looking to cast a new European character, it was mentioned that we had a "Greek" boy in the other day and he was very good, and was then asked by producers to "go and look for him", as we want to cast him in a regular role, He commonly appeared in scenes with his "pop" played by Joseph Furst and his over-protective fiery Italian aunt played by Arianthe Galani, as part of a new Italian family that was introduced to the series.

Michaels worked on the English-language ethnic television, as the host of Greek Affair and The Greek Variety Show which were broadcast on Network 10 in the 1980s.

== Producer and director ==
Michael is best known for being the producer of the home fitness training Tvseries Aerobics Oz Style and it's collective video's

As a director he has been associate with sport broadcasts, for various international soccer matches.

== Honours ==
He was awarded the Order of Australia in 2004, with the citation "For service to multicultural media and soccer.

== Filmography ==
=== Acting and hosting ===
- Odyssey: A Journey (TV movie (1974)
- Number 96 as Giovanni Lenzi
- Cop Shop as Father Andropolous
- Cathy's Child (1979 film) as taxi driver
- Special Squad as Lou Spiera
- The Tourist (TV movie) Anwan

== TV producer ==
- Aerobics Oz Style television series and exercise videos.

== Director Credits ==
- 2006 – Australia v Greece,
- 2005 – Australia v Iraq, Australia v Solomon Islands, Australia v Indonesia,
- 2002 – UEFA Cup in Greece: Aek v Inter Milan,
- 1998 – Australia v Iran (Logie Award winning), Australia v Uruguay 2006 World Cup Qualifier
- 1993 – World Youth Championships (directed & produced)
- 1986–1996 – Australian National Soccer League
- 2010–2011 – Sky News "The Nation" and "Australian Agenda"
