= Brando with a Glass Eye =

- Directed by: Antonis Tsonis
- Produced by: Tia Spanos Tsonis; Blake Northfield; Kurt Royan
- Starring: Yannis Niarros; Kostas Nikouli; Alexandros Chrysanthopoulos
- Release date: 2024
- Language: Greek

Brando with a Glass Eye is a 2024 film by Greek Australian director Antonis Tsonis.

== Plot ==
In Athens, Luca, a mechanic and aspiring method actor, lives with his brother Alekos in difficult financial circumstances. When Luca receives an opportunity to audition for a prestigious acting school in New York City, the brothers attempt an armed robbery to raise the money needed for him to relocate. During the heist, Luca accidentally shoots a passerby, Ilias, leaving him seriously injured.

Luca later visits Ilias in hospital intending to prevent him from identifying his attacker, but instead forms a tentative friendship with him. Ilias, a withdrawn middle-class man struggling with his own sense of purpose, remains unaware of Luca’s involvement in the crime. As Luca prepares for his audition, he introduces Ilias to acting exercises, drawing him into his world while concealing the truth about the shooting.

As the audition approaches, Luca becomes increasingly consumed by his pursuit of method acting, blurring the boundaries between performance and reality. His growing bond with Ilias is complicated by guilt, deception, and the unresolved consequences of the crime, forcing Luca to confront the moral cost of his ambition.

== Cast ==
- Yannis Niarros as Luca
- Kostas Nikouli as Alekos
- Alexandros Chrysanthopoulos as Ilias
- Yiannis Tsortekis as Vasilis
- Maria Kallimani as Eugenia
- Ksenia Dania as Eva

== Production ==
The film was shot on location in Athens and filmed in the Greek language. It was written and directed by Antonis Tsonis and produced by his wife Tia Spanos Tsonis and Blake Northfield of Bronte Studios with Executive Producers, Maria Drandaki, Panagiotis Fafoutis and Peter Kallos. It is Tsonis' first feature film. Its cinematography was inspired by 1970s aesthetics, and the character of Luca was influenced by Tsonis' experiences and the career of American actor Marlon Brando.

== Release ==
The film had its world premiere at the Slamdance Film Festival in the United States on January 20, 2024 and made history as the first Greek-language film to compete in the Narrative Feature category. It won Best Feature in London at the 2024 New Renaissance Film Festival. Brando with a Glass Eye represented Greece at the 2025 European Union Film Festival in Canada with screenings in Toronto, Ottawa and Vancouver.

== Reception ==
Martin Kudláč of Cineuropa wrote that "While the film’s meta-cinematic approach manages to pay homage to the art of acting and classic cinema, it also serves as a channel for a variety of metaphors, including the quest for identity and the portrayal of a personality disorder." Erin Free of FilmInk also praised the film, "Awash with gorgeous imagery courtesy of cinematographer Jorg Gruber, and rich in a distinctly 1970s-derived aesthetic, Brando with a Glass Eye is [a] swirling, occasionally dreamy tale." Writing for The AU Review, critic Peter Gray described the film as examining the tensions between ambition and self-deception within the practice of method acting.
