= Christos Pantelis =

Australian professor of medicine

Christos Pantelis is an Australian professor of medicine who is the Director of the Melbourne Neuropsychiatry Centre.

== Profile ==
Christos Pantelis is an Australian of Greek background. He completed his medical degree at the University of Melbourne and trained at St Vincent's Hospital in Melbourne. Two years later, in 1979, he commenced his training in psychiatry at the Royal Free Hospital in London, England. During his training, he spent 18 months as a Research Registrar at University College Hospital to undertake an epidemiological study of schizophrenia in Inner London. He was appointed as a lecturer at Charing Cross & Westminster Medical School (UK) in 1988. In this position, he worked in the Academic Unit at Horton and the Gordon Hospitals, headed by Professor Thomas R.E. Barnes. The unit was involved in a number of research studies in schizophrenia including phenomenology, psychopharmacology, studies on movement disorder, neuropsychological aspects of schizophrenia, as well as epidemiology and social psychiatric aspects of schizophrenia.

In 1992, he was awarded the Lilly Travelling Fellowship of the Royal College of Psychiatrists and the King Edward's Hospital Fund for London, England. During this year, he was Travelling Research Fellow with the National Institute of Mental Health (Washington, DC), where he worked with Dr. Richard Coppola and Dr. Daniel Weinberger, developing a technique for volumetric analysis of brain MRI images. He then returned briefly to the UK as a Research Fellow.

After his return from England at the end of 1992, Prof. Christos Pantelis worked at the Mental Health Research Institute and at Royal Park Psychiatric Hospital. He established the Cognitive Neuropsychiatry Research Unit, which is now based at both the Mental Health Research Institute and Sunshine Hospital. He also heads the Academic Unit at Sunshine Hospital. He became a Fellow of the Royal Australian and New Zealand College of Psychiatrists in 1999.

Prof. Pantelis was Director of the inpatient rehabilitation program at Royal Park Hospital until mid-1996. During this time, he was responsible for the inpatient rehabilitation program and was instrumental in developing a comprehensive Model of Care for patients with long-term mental illness, and establishing a region-wide coordinating committee to oversee developments in delivery of services to these patients. He is currently Clinical Director and Principal Specialist for the Adult Mental Health Rehabilitation Unit (AMHRU) at Sunshine Hospital. This is a 26-beds unit for patients with treatment-resistant psychoses. He was actively involved in planning the movement of the Rehabilitation Unit to Sunshine Hospital and in the establishment of an Academic and Research Unit at that site. This included providing expertise into the architectural design of the new clinical and research units. These units opened in early 2000.
