= Australians in Greece =

Community

Total population
- c. 100,000

Languages
- Australian English & Greek

An estimated 135,000 Australians live in Greece. Out of the community, at least 100,000 live in the city of Athens. The remaining are spread out throughout various parts of the country, especially in Thessaloniki. The Australian population in Greece is mostly Australians of Greek descent with dual citizenship. However, due to the economic crisis in Greece, many Australian citizens in the Hellenic country have returned to Australia.

== See also ==
- Australia–Greece relations
- Australian diaspora
- Immigration to Greece
- Greek Australians
