= Justin Tsoulos =

Greek Australian rugby league footballer

Personal information
- Full name: Justin Tsoulos
- Born: 20 February 1984 (age 41) Sydney, New South Wales, Australia
- Height: 6 ft 1 in (185 cm)
- Weight: 17 st 4 lb (242 lb; 110 kg)

Playing information
- Position: Prop
Club
Years	Team	Pld	T	G	FG	P
2003–07	Parramatta Eels	26	2	0	0	8
2008	Canterbury-Bankstown	5	0	0	0	0
	Total	31	2	0	0	8
- Source: As of 17 January 2019

Justin Tsoulos (born 20 February 1984) is a Greek Australian rugby league former professional footballer who played in the National Rugby League for Canterbury-Bankstown and Parramatta.

== Playing career ==
Tsoulos made his first grade debut on 29 June 2003 as a 19-year-old, playing for the Parramatta Eels against the Newcastle Knights at EnergyAustralia Stadium.

Tsoulos only made 23 appearances for Parramatta, due mainly to a poor run with injury that saw him miss the entire 2006 due to a shoulder injury sustained in a pre-season trial match.

Tsoulos then signed with Canterbury-Bankstown for the 2008 season. Due to his Greek heritage, Tsoulos was eligible to represent the Greece national rugby league team.
