= Rosehip neuron =

Type of inhibitory neuron in the human cerebral cortex

Rosehip neurons are inhibitory GABAergic neurons present in the first layer (the molecular layer) of the human cerebral cortex. They make up about 10–15% of all inhibitory neurons in Layer 1. Neurons of this type (having large "rosehip"-like axonal boutons and compact arborization) exist in humans, but have not been reported in rodents.

Rosehip neurons are named after the rose hip fruit due to the axon terminal's resemblance to their berries.

These rosehip cells show an immunohistochemical profile (GAD1+CCK+, CNR1–SST–CALB2–PVALB–) matching a single transcriptomically defined cell type whose specific molecular marker signature is not seen in mouse cortex. Rosehip cells in layer 1 make homotypic gap junctions, predominantly target apical dendritic shafts of layer 3 pyramidal neurons, and inhibit backpropagating pyramidal action potentials in microdomains of the dendritic tuft. These cells are therefore positioned for potent local control of distal dendritic computation in cortical pyramidal neurons.

== Discovery ==
An international group of scientists discovered rosehip neurons and announced their discovery in August 2018, in a paper in Nature Neuroscience. These authors contributed equally to this work: Eszter Boldog (University of Szeged, Hungary), Trygve E. Bakken (Allen Institute for Brain Science, Seattle), and Rebecca D. Hodge (Allen Institute for Brain Science, Seattle). They identified this cell with the help of single-nucleus RNA sequencing combined with patch-clamp electrophysiology.

The team analyzed microdissected layer 1 tissue from the human middle temporal gyrus. Using single-nucleus RNA sequencing, they identified ten transcriptomically distinct GABAergic interneuron subtypes in layer 1 of the cortex. One of these, designated the "i4" cluster, did not correspond to any cell type previously characterized in mouse cortex. The transcriptomic identity of the i4 cluster was then linked to a morphologically defined cell through patch-clamp recordings followed by biocytin filling and single-cell PCR for marker genes. Rosehip cells accounted for 10 of 76 layer 1 interneurons recovered with full axo-somato-dendritic morphology in the study (approximately 13% of the sample).

== Morphology ==
The somata and dendrites of rosehip neurons are confined to layer 1, with only distal dendrites occasionally extending into layer 2. The proximal dendrites and somata bear stub-like spines, and the axon usually emerges from the basal part of the soma to form a compact, dense arborization predominantly within layer 1. Along the axonal collaterals, the cells form large, rosehip-shaped boutons with diameters not seen in other types of human layer 1 interneurons in the original sample.

== See also ==
- Endorestiform nucleus, a nucleus discovered in 2018 which is uniquely present in humans
- Interneuron
- Single-nucleus RNA sequencing
