= Anna Perivolaris =

Australian schoolteacher born in Greece

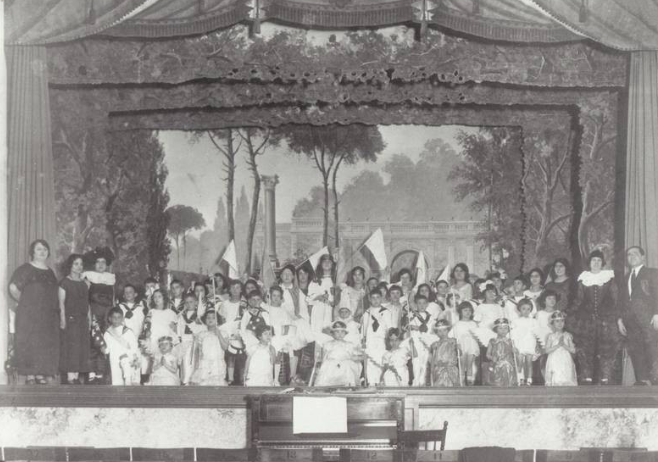
- Anna Perivolaris on the left of her 1924 concert
- Born: Anna Christodoulis; 1888; Samos
- Died: 27 January 1963 (aged 74–75); Royal Perth Hospital
- Other names: Anna Boreas
- Occupation: school teacher
- Known for: championing Greek culture
- Spouse(s): John Boreas; Nicolas Guiseppe Perivolaris
- Children: three

Anna Perivolaris (1888 – 27 January 1963) was an Australian schoolteacher born in Greece. She advocated for Greek culture in Australia.

== Life ==
Perivolaris was born on the Greek island of Samos in about 1888. Her parents were Anthea (born Chrysakis) and Constantine Christodoulis. Her father was an artist, and in 1903, the family was in Egypt, where Anna married. She and John Boreas had a son and two daughters, but John died, and Anna married again. Her second husband was a Greek sailor named Nicolas Giuseppe Perivolaris, and he went to Australia in 1921. Anna and the children joined him in 1923 after a journey on HMS Jervis Bay. They lived and she taught in Sydney. There was a Greek school in Sydney from 1923 which employed her. In 1924 she organised a concert by Greek children at King's Hall in Sydney. She was invited to Perth by Peter Spero Michelides.

In Perth in 1915, the Reverend Father Germanons Illiou had organised an after-hours Greek school in Aberdeen Street. In 1924, the local Hellenic Community took over the Greek evening school in Aberdeen Street. In 1930 she became the Greek School in Perth's first employee. (One source says 1935).

In 1938, she and her family became Australians, and during the war, she raised money for the Greek government in exile by organising more concerts. The community thanked her by organising a concert for her in 1943. She continued to work for the Greek School even after her husband retired and was paid five pounds a week.

Perivolaris died in Royal Perth Hospital in 1963. In 2003, the Hellenic Community Greek School was still running as the oldest after-school group in Western Australia. The school still taught the Greek language and culture. The St. Andrew's Greek Orthodox Grammar School was started by the Greek community in Dianella in 1990 and "her" school is attached .
