= Phillip Poursanidis =

Australian rules footballer

Personal information
- Full name: Phillip Poursanidis
- Nickname: Phil
- Born: 9 May 1968 (age 58)
- Original team: Paramount
- Height: 192 cm (6 ft 4 in)
- Weight: 87 kg (192 lb)
- Position: Key forward

Playing career^{1}
Years	Club	Games (Goals)
1988–1989	Carlton	3 (3)
- ^{1} Playing statistics correct to the end of 1989.

Phillip "Phil" Poursanidis (born 9 May 1968) is a former Australian rules footballer who played with Carlton in the Victorian Football League (VFL).
