= Arthur Karanicolas =

Australian rules footballer

Personal information
- Full name: Arthur Karanicolas
- Born: 10 July 1944 (age 82)
- Original team: University High School
- Height: 171 cm (5 ft 7 in)
- Weight: 66 kg (146 lb)
- Position: Rover

Playing career^{1}
Years	Club	Games (Goals)
1964–1968	North Melbourne	69 (55)
- ^{1} Playing statistics correct to the end of 1968.

Arthur Karanicolas (born 10 July 1944) is a former Australian rules footballer who played for the North Melbourne Football Club in the Victorian Football League (VFL).
