= George Paxinos =

Greek Australian neuroscientist

George Paxinos AO FASSA FAA FRSN FAHMS
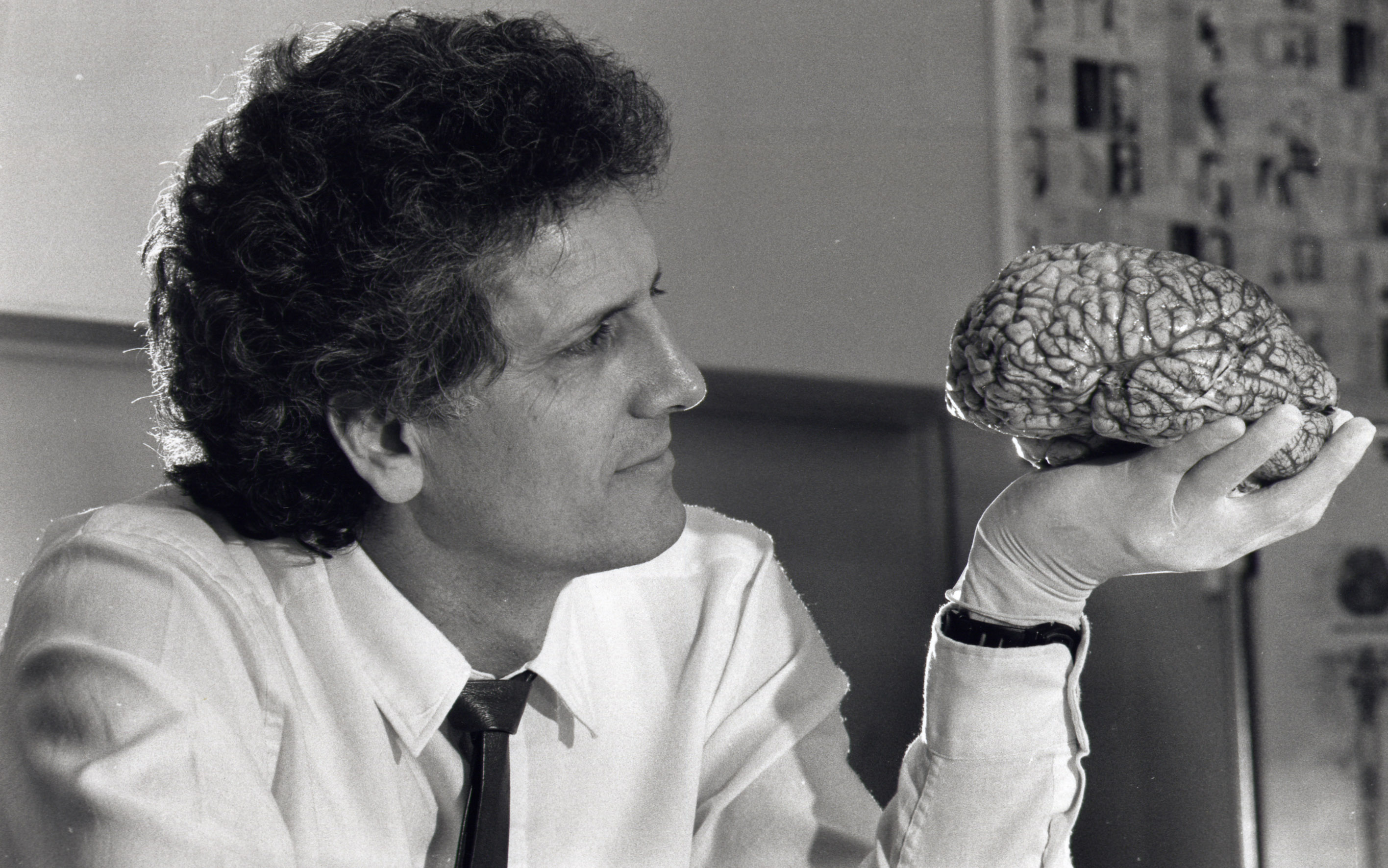
- Born: Yiorgos Paxinos (Γιώργος Παξινός); 6 December 1944 (age 81); Ithaca, Greece
- Education: University of California (BA); McGill University (PhD)
- Children: 2
- Awards: The Award for Excellence in Publishing in Medical Science from the Association of American Publishers (1997); FASAA (1999); Order of Australia (2002); Humboldt Research Award (2003); President of the Australian Neuroscience Society (2004); President IBRO World Congress of Neuroscience (2004–2007); The Distinguished Scientific Contribution Award, The Aus Psychological Society (2007); Distinguished Fellow, Royal Society of New South Wales (2019)
- Website: neura.edu.au/research/themes/paxinos-group

George Paxinos (Greek: Γιώργος Παξινός; born 6 December 1944) is a Greek Australian neuroscientist, born in Ithaca. He completed his BA in psychology at the University of California at Berkeley and his PhD at McGill University in Montreal, Canada. After a postdoctoral year at Yale University, he moved to the School of Psychology of the University of New South Wales in Sydney, Australia. He is currently an NHMRC Senior Principal Research Fellow at Neuroscience Research Australia and Scientia Professor of Medical Sciences at the University of New South Wales.

He is a fellow of the Australian Academy of Science, the Australian Academy of Social Sciences in Australia, and the Australian Academy of Health and Medical Sciences. He was also awarded a Distinguished Fellow of the Royal Society of New South Wales in 2019. Paxinos is a corresponding member of the Academy of Athens, and the only Australian with this award.

== Research ==
Paxinos has published 58 books. He has identified 94 nuclei (areas) in the rat and human brains. Comparing rats and humans, he has identified 64 homologous nuclei. He has identified 180 nuclei and homologies in birds. He was the first to derive reliable stereotaxic coordinates for the brain of rats, mice, birds and primates — a factor fueling the explosion in neuroscience research since the 1980s. He developed the first comprehensive nomenclature and ontology for the brain, covering humans, birds, and developing mammals. Further, Paxinos constructed the most frequently cited atlases of the brain and spinal cord of rats, mice, monkeys, birds and humans. He also published developmental atlases of rats and mice, and the only comprehensive MRI/DTI atlas of the rat brain

=== Impact ===
Most scientists working on the relation between the human brain and neurologic or psychiatric diseases, or animal models of these diseases, use his maps and concepts of brain organization. His human brain analysis are the most accurate ones for identification of deep structures and are used in surgical theatres.

=== Citation record and grant support ===
In the field of neuroscience, he is the author of the most cited publication internationally (The Rat Brain in Stereotaxic Coordinates (Paxinos and Watson, 1986.). For three decades, this was the third most cited book in science after Molecular Cloning and the Diagnostic and Statistical Manual of Mental Disorders (73,174 citations over its 7 editions). Currently is ranked 14th in the 100 Most Cited Books of All-Time – BooksIcon.com In total, his works have been cited 114,118 times, with 80,070 as first author.

Paxinos holds two National Health and Medical Research Council (NHMRC) project grants.

Until 2013, he held an NHMRC Australia Fellowship ($4 million) with UNSW support ($1.5 million) as well as two grants from NIH (USD150,000 and USD528,951). He was a member of the first International Consortium for Brain Mapping. Unlike most academic books, some of his atlases have been commercially successful; he was able to obtain grants for his laboratory from the publishers development to fund eight prizes from book royalties.

=== Editorial boards of international refereed journals ===
Paxinos has served on 16 journal editorial boards, including Frontiers in Neuroanatomy (2008–present), Dialogues in Clinical Neuroscience & Mental Health (2018 - present), Brain Structure and Function (2007–present), Translational Neuroscience (2008–present), ISRN Neurology (2010–present), PLoS ONE, for the SBMT NeuroMapping and Therapeutics Collection (2012–present), Journal of Chemical Neuroanatomy (2004–2014), BrainNavigator (2009–12), Neuroscience and Bio-behavioral Reviews (2000–11), Journal of Comparative Neurology Human Brain Mapping, Posters in Neuroscience, Journal fur Hirnforschung, International Neuropsychiatric Disease Journal, and NeuroImage.

== Contribution to the Profession ==
- President of the Australian Neuroscience Society (ANS; 2004-5).
- President, World Congress of Neuroscience (2004-7).
- Chairperson, IBRO World Congress & Regional Meetings Committee (2007–11).

Honorary Life Memberships

- Society of Speech Therapists of Greece (Σύλλογος Επιστημόνων Λογοπαθολόγων Λογοθεραπευτών Ελλάδος)
- Hellenic Neuropsychology Society

Conference Organizing

- President of the Local Organizing Committee for the 2007 Melbourne IBRO World Congress of Neuroscience (and President of the Melbourne consortium bid for the Congress).
- Mai, Saper and Paxinos organized the International Conference on the Structural Basis for Understanding Human Brain Function and Dysfunction; Roma 5-10 Oct 2002.
- He was a founding member of the international committee that organizes the International Human Brain Mapping Conferences.

== Contribution to teaching ==
He wrote the textbook The Brain: an Introduction to Functional Neuroanatomy (2010) which is used in the Australian and New Zealand Brain Bee Challenge and has contributed to Australia’s dominance in the International Brain Bee Challenge competition. He taught psychology for 27 years and served on the Academic Board and Council of UNSW. He is currently supervising two postdoctoral fellows and a PhD student.

== Professional service ==
- President of the Australasian Neuroscience Society (ANS; 2004–5).
- President, World Congress of Neuroscience (2004–07).
- Chairperson, IBRO World Congress & Regional Meetings Committee (2007–11).

== Community service ==
- Founder and President of the Light Rail Association (1989–2000)
- Founder and former Secretary of the Migrants' Rights Committee
- Candidate for the Australian Cyclists Party
- Founder of the Living Junction Facebook Community, the Coastal Walk Group and the Randwick Environmental Group.

== Honours and awards ==
- 1968 The Warner Brown Memorial Prize, University of California at Berkeley
- 1992 The Walter Burfitt Prize, Royal Society of NSW
- 1994 DSc, The University of New South Wales
- 1997 The Award for Excellence in Publishing in Medical Science, Assoc American Publishers
- 1999 Disk of Sacred Truce, International Committee of Olympic Winners; for Community Service
- 1999 The University of New South Wales Alumni Achievement Award
- 1999 The Ramaciotti Medal for Excellence in Biomedical Research
- 1999 FASSA (Fellow of the Academy of Social Sciences in Australia)
- 2001 Scientia Professor, The University of New South Wales (Distinguished Professor)
- 2002 AO (Officer in the General Division of the Order of Australia for service to Neuroscience)
- 2003 Alexander von Humboldt Award (Prize) (Germany) for contributions to neuroscience
- 2004 President, Australian Neuroscience Society
- 2004–7 President, IBRO World Congress of Neuroscience
- 2007 The Distinguished Scientific Contribution Award, The Aus Psychological Society
- 2008 Doctor Honoris Causa, University of Athens
- 2009 NHMRC Australia Fellow
- 2009 FAA (Fellow of the Australian Academy of Science)
- 2011 Honorary President, School of Psychology, City Unity College (Athens)
- 2012 Pioneer in Medicine Award, Society for Brain Mapping and Therapeutics
- 2012 Academy of Athens, elected foreign member
- 2013 Scientia Professor, University of New South Wales
- 2014 Fellow, Royal Society of New South Wales
- 2019 FAHMS (Fellow of the Australian Academy of Health and Medical Sciences)
- 2019 Distinguished Fellow, Royal Society of New South Wales (an award limited to 24 fellows)
- 2020 2020 PROSE Awards Finalist in Biomedicine & Neuroscience, Assoc of American Publishers
- 2021 One of the 63-scientists identified in the study “1821-2021 – Greek Pioneers in Medicine and Biomedical Sciences” by ARISTEiA and The American College of Greece.

== Nina Kondelos Prize ==
The Nina Kondelos Prize has been awarded annually since 2007 to a female neuroscientist for making significant contributions to neuroscience research. The award is named after the late sister of Professor George Paxinos and was initially funded by him.
