= Tony Spassopoulos =

Australian rules footballer

Personal information
- Full name: Tony Spassopoulos
- Born: 19 January 1965 (age 61)
- Original team: Koonung
- Height: 185 cm (6 ft 1 in)
- Weight: 85 kg (187 lb)

Playing career^{1}
Years	Club	Games (Goals)
1985	Fitzroy	1 (0)
- ^{1} Playing statistics correct to the end of 1985.

Tony Spassopoulos is a former Australian rules footballer, who played for the Fitzroy Football Club in the Victorian Football League (VFL).

== Career ==
Spassopoulos played one game for Fitzroy in the 1985 season.
