= Australia–Greece bilateral treaties =

The following is a list of international bilateral treaties between Australia and Greece

- Early treaties were extended to Australia by the British Empire, however they are still generally in force.
- European Union treaties, extended to Greece are not included below.

1875	Extradition	Agreement between the United Kingdom of Great Britain and Ireland and Greece relative to Merchant Seamen Deserters (Athens, 19 August 1875)
1886	Extradition	Treaty of Commerce and Navigation between the United Kingdom of Great Britain and Ireland and Greece, and Protocol (Athens, 10 November 1886)
1888	Trade	Agreement between the United Kingdom of Great Britain and Ireland and Greece for Regulating the Position of Joint Stock Companies (Athens, 4 August 1888)
1912	Extradition	Treaty [between the United Kingdom of Great Britain and Ireland and the Kingdom of Greece] for the Mutual Surrender of Fugitive Criminals
1921	War/Peace	Agreement between the Government of the United Kingdom of Great Britain and Ireland and the Government of Greece relative to the Graves of British Soldiers in Hellenic Territory
1926	Trade	Agreement between the Government of the United Kingdom of Great Britain and Northern Ireland (and on behalf of Australia, Canada, India, the Irish Free State, Newfoundland, New Zealand and South Africa) and the Government of Greece respecting the Measurement of Tonnage of Merchant Ships, and Exchange of Notes
1928	Extradition	Exchange of Notes between the Government of the United Kingdom of Great Britain and Northern Ireland (and on behalf of Australia, New Zealand and South Africa) and the Government of Greece extending to Certain Mandated Territories the Treaty for the Mutual Surrender of Fugitive Criminals of 24 September 1910
1938	Civil law	Convention between the United Kingdom and Greece regarding Legal Proceedings in Civil and Commercial Matters
1940	Trade	Exchange of Notes constituting an Agreement between the Government of the Commonwealth of Australia and the Government of the Kingdom of Greece regarding Commercial Relations
1948	War/Peace	Exchange of Notes constituting an Agreement between the Government of Australia and the Government of Greece concerning the Release of Greek Assets held under Australian Statutes
1948	War/Peace	Exchange of Notes constituting an Agreement between the Government of Australia and the Government of Greece regarding a Gift of Relief Supplies to Greece
1952	Consular	Exchange of Notes constituting an Agreement between the Government of Australia and the Royal Hellenic Government on the Rights and Privileges of the Australian Migration Office in Athens
1954	Postal	Agreement for the Exchange of [postal] Parcels between the Commonwealth of Australia and Greece
1954	Visas	Exchange of Notes constituting an Agreement between the Government of Australia and the Government of Greece regarding Visas and Visa Fees
1956	Consular	Exchange of Notes constituting an Agreement between the Government of Australia and the Royal Hellenic Government on the Rights and Privileges accorded to the Australian Consulate-General at Athens
1971	Trade	Agreement between the Government of the Commonwealth of Australia and the Government of the Kingdom of Greece relating to Air Services
1972	Social security	Exchange of Letters constituting an Agreement between the Government of Australia and the Government of Greece relating to Portability of Pensions
1981	Taxation	Agreement between the Government of Australia and the Government of the Hellenic Republic for the Avoidance of Double Taxation of Income derived from International Air Transport
1981	Other	Agreement between the Government of Australia and the Government of the Hellenic Republic on Cultural Cooperation
1991	Extradition	Treaty on Extradition between Australia and the Hellenic Republic
2008	Social security	Agreement Between Australia and the Hellenic Republic on Social Security (Canberra, 23 May 2007)
