= Costas Tsicaderis =

Greek-Australian singer-songwriter

- Birth name: Constantine Tsicaderis
- Born: 6 January 1945; Greece
- Died: 23 December 2004 (aged 59)
- Genres: Greek music, éntekhno, folk, world
- Occupation(s): Singer-songwriter, musician, record producer
- Instrument(s): Vocals, guitar
- Years active: 1974–2004

Costas Tsicaderis (6 January 1945 – 23 December 2004) was a Greek-Australian singer-songwriter.

== Biography ==
Costas Tsicaderis was born in Katerini in the north of Greece in 1945, and his family migrated to Australia in 1954, when Costas was nine years old. In Greece his father ran a taverna, but in Australia he ended up at the General Motors Holden plant in Melbourne.

Costas completed his schooling in Melbourne and became a draughtsman running his own business. Later he studied architecture at the RMIT and went on to teach the subject at Preston TAFE.

At high school Costas began to play the guitar and developed an interest in folk music. He first presented some of his compositions to audiences in 1974. In the 1980s he formed the Costas Tsicaderis Ensemble.

He had a long association with the Melbourne cultural support group and "world music café" The Boite, where he was a regular performer.

For many years he presented a weekly programme of Greek music for the community radio station 3ZZZ (mid 1990s to 2000). He also presented a programme for 3XY (late 1990s to his death).

In 2001 he produced a compilation CD for 3ZZZ funded by AMRAP. Of this he wrote: "One of the most exciting activities for me last year was my involvement as producer in 3ZZZ’s CD Routes of Rhythm, a compilation of six exciting and previously unrecorded Melbourne groups." This was followed by a second CD Routes of Rhythm 2, which Costas also produced.

Costas Tsicaderis died suddenly on 23 December 2004 aged 59. "The Music of Costas Tsicaderis", a feature that was produced for Australian Broadcasting Corporation radio in 1985, was aired again on the Australian Broadcasting Corporation National Radio programme Music Deli as a tribute. The Melbourne Greek newspaper Neos Kosmos named him 2004 Greek of the Year. Close friends and colleagues established The Costas Tsicaderis Memorial Foundation with the aim of providing financial assistance to promising young musicians.

A tribute concert and launch of the CD The Mighty and the Humble was presented by The Boite and the Costas Tsicaderis Memorial Foundation on 1 December 2006 at BMW Edge, Federation Square, Melbourne.

== Musical works ==
His music has been described as belonging "firmly in the popular tradition defined and developed by Hatzidakis, Theodorakis, and other Greek composers who set Greek poetry to music", and as characterised by "gentle melodies and orchestration with bitter-sweet and often nostalgic lyrics". The song "The Pomegranate" was singled out for particular praise by critics: "His setting of Dimitris Tsaloumas' poem "The Pomegranate", is a consummate example of antipodean Greek art." And: "The song as such is … superb—the lyrics and the melody are perfectly matched, and the melody has the simplicity and coherence of structure which go to make a classic."

Also singled out was his setting to music of Nikos Ninolakis' poem "Select a Day". One critic described it as "an absolutely marvellous song," and added "I especially like the way the melody rises unexpectedly in the chorus on the word έκσταση so that in retrospect one feels that it has been killing time, waiting for that climactic, ecstatic moment.

== Discography ==
The Costas Tsicaderis discography includes a total of 23 songs composed by Tsicaderis himself. These are listed below, along with the name of the lyricist. In most cases, the lyrics are poems by Greek Australians which Tsicaderis set to music. The dates indicate which album(s) each song is on. Songs are in Greek unless otherwise stated.

=== Songs ===
- "After Ephialtes" (1985, 2006), Stylianos Harkianakis
- "Beyond Mulamein" (Instrumental, 1985, 2006), inspired by Nikos Ninolakis' poem of the same name
- "Butterfly" (1985, 2006), Nikos Ninolakis
- "Daddy, What will Santa Bring?" (2006), Costas Tsicaderis
- "Hey True Blue" (English, 2006), Costas Tsicaderis
- "I Took the Path to the Mountain" (2006), Dimitris Tsaloumas
- "In Foreign Lands" (2006), Andreas Triantafyllopoulos
- "In the Streets of St Kilda" (1992), Savvas Zoumis
- "Letters Bearing Bad Tidings" (1985), Dimitris Tsaloumas
- "Letters From Australia" (1992), Andreas Triantafyllopoulos
- "Love Amongst the Ruins" (Instrumental, 1985, 2006),
- "Prerecorded Message" (English, 1985, 2006), Costas Tsicaderis
- "Select a Day" (1985, 2006), Nikos Ninolakis
- "The Aegean" (2006), Nikos Ninolakis
- "The Foreigner" (1992), Dimitris Tsaloumas
- "The Lost Swallow" (1985, 2006), Andreas Triantafyllopoulos
- "The Marketplace of War" (1992), Andreas Triantafyllopoulos
- "The Mighty and the Humble" (1985, 1992, 2003, 2006), Olga Yiannopoulou-Best & Costas Tsicaderis
- "The Pomegranate" (1985, 2006, 2010), Dimitris Tsaloumas
- "The Yearning" (1985, 2006), Andreas Triantafyllopoulos
- "They’ve Taken the Sun" (2010), Nikos Ninolakis
- "Tonight, Greece, I Think of You" (1992), D. Katsoulis
- "Uprooted Cyppress Tree" (1985, 1992, 2006), Costas Tsicaderis (with a different title, "The Refugee", in 1992)

=== Albums ===
- Costas Tsicaderis, Live at the Boite (Melbourne: The Boite, 1985) stereo cassette. Vocals: Rena Hatzilepou, Costas Tsicaderis.
- Irine Vela & Costas Tsicaderis, Greek 3CR (Melbourne: 3CR, 1992) stereo LP and cassette. Side 1 contains seven songs by Irine Vela, and side 2 contains seven songs by Costas Tsicaderis.
- The Fig Tree CD: A Musical Companion to Arnold Zable's Book (Melbourne: The Boite, 2003). Winner of the National Folk Recording Award 2004. Costas Tsicaderis contributed four tracks: "I once Loved a Shepherdess" ( Μια βοσκοπούλα αγάπησα); "The Song of the Dawn" (Το μινόρε της αυγής); The Boat (Το πλοίο); and his own composition "The Mighty and the Humble" (Οι μικροί και οι μεγάλοι).
- The Mighty and the Humble (Melbourne: The Boite, 2006). A posthumous compilation of Costas Tsicaderis recordings, many from the Music Deli programme of 1985.
- In a Strange Land / Επί Γης Αλλοτρίας: An Anthology of Greek-Australian Songs and Music (2010). This anthology includes two songs composed by Costas Tsicaderis, and performed by him for the Anthology: "They’ve Taken the Sun" and "The Pomegranate".
