= Gary Frangalas =

Australian footballer

Personal information
- Born: 6 May 1963 (age 63)
- Original team: Clayton
- Height: 183 cm (6 ft 0 in)
- Weight: 95 kg (209 lb)

Playing career^{1}
Years	Club	Games (Goals)
1983–1985	Sydney Swans	51 (30)
1986–1989	Richmond	17 (2)
Total		68 (32)
- ^{1} Playing statistics correct to the end of 1989.

Gary Frangalas (born 6 May 1963) is a former Australian rules footballer who played with the Sydney Swans and Richmond in the Victorian Football League (VFL).

Frangalas, a Clayton recruit, played mostly across half back and half forward. He played with Sydney for three league seasons and didn't miss a single game in 1985. Based in Melbourne during that time, he was one of the Swans players requested by club management to make the move to Sydney for the 1986 season, but he instead joined Richmond, a club he had supported growing up. During his time at Richmond he struggled with injuries, including a torn knee cartilage.

Frangalas joined Victorian Football Association club Dandenong in 1991. He played a part in the team's premiership winning season, but was a late withdrawal from the Grand Final itself due to a shoulder injury.

He then coached for several seasons in the mid-1990s, before taking a break and then returning to coach with the Hallam Hawks in the Southern Football League in 2015.

Frangalas is of Greek descent and is married to wife Sharyn. The couple have three children, Chloe, Amy, and Sam.
