= Steve Nikitaras =

Australian-Greek cricketer

Personal information
- Born: 31 August 1970 (age 56); Port Kembla, New South Wales, Australia
- Batting: Right-handed
- Bowling: Left-arm fast-medium
- Role: Bowler
- Relatives: Blake Nikitaras (son)

International information
- National side: Greece (1990–2011)

Domestic team information
- Years: Team
- 1996/97: New South Wales
- 1998/99–2000/01: Western Australia

Career statistics
| Competition | First-class | List A |
|---|---|---|
| Matches | 4 | 14 |
| Runs scored | 24 | 6 |
| Batting average | 6.00 | 3.00 |
| 100s/50s | 0/0 | 0/0 |
| Top score | 12 | 6 |
| Balls bowled | 577 | 650 |
| Wickets | 7 | 7 |
| Bowling average | 49.71 | 69.14 |
| 5 wickets in innings | 0 | 0 |
| 10 wickets in match | 0 | 0 |
| Best bowling | 3/76 | 3/30 |
| Catches/stumpings | 2/- | 4/- |
- Source: CricketArchive, 9 January 2013

Steven Nikitaras (Greek: Stavros Nikitaras; born 31 August 1970) is a former professional cricketer who played at Australian domestic level for both New South Wales and Western Australia. A left-arm pace bowler, he went on to play for the Greek national side after the end of his professional career.

Nikitaras was born in Port Kembla, a suburb of Wollongong, New South Wales, to Greek emigrant parents. He did not take up playing cricket until he was 19. Batting right-handed and bowling left-arm fast-medium, Nikitaras was shortly afterwards selected for a Wollongong representative team, and within a year had progressed to the Sydney grade cricket competition. From the 1993–94 season onwards, he began to be regularly selected for New South Wales second XI matches. Nikitaras made his debut for the senior team in a Mercantile Mutual Cup match against Western Australia during the 1996–97 season. In the match, played in October 1996 at North Sydney Oval, he failed to take a wicket, but was selected in another one-day match five days later, against Queensland, and again went wicketless. Nikitaras' inaugural Sheffield Shield match came against Queensland the following month. In the match, played at Bankstown Oval, Sydney, he took 3/76 in Queensland's first innings opening the bowling alongside Phil Alley.

Although he appeared in several more matches during the 1996–97 season, including against a touring England "A" team, Nikitaras did not play at all at state level during the 1997–98 season, and transferred to Western Australia the following season. Playing for Perth in the local grade cricket competition, he made his debut for Western Australia towards the end of the 1998–99 season, in a Sheffield Shield match against Queensland at the WACA Ground. Bowling first change behind Jo Angel and Matthew Nicholson, he did not take a wicket, and failed to play another match at state level during the season. However, the following season was Nikitaras' most successful at state level. He gained regular selection in Mercantile Mutual Cup matches, playing seven out of eight matches in the tournament, and taking seven wickets, third in Western Australia's bowling aggregates behind Angel and Darren Wates. Nikitaras was particularly valued for his low economy rate, conceding just 4.00 runs per over to finish with Western Australia's best rate and the equal-fifth-best rate in the competition (for bowlers with over five wickets). His best bowling figures, 3/30 from ten overs, came against the Canberra Comets in early January 2000.

Despite his good form during the 1999–2000 season, which had helped him secure a contract from the Western Australian Cricket Association, Nikitaras played only four matches for Western Australia the following season, including a match against the West Indies on their 2000–01 tour of Australia. Having failed to gain a contract for the 2001–02 season, Nikitaras signed with the Middlesex County Cricket Club for the 2002 English cricket season, on a one-year contract. As a Greek citizen, he was not counted as an overseas player, under the terms of the Bosman ruling. Struggling with injury, he played only two matches during the season, both in the Second XI Championship. Having first played for the side in 1990, against Guernsey, Nikitaras represented the Greek national cricket team at several tournaments after the conclusion of his first-class playing career. In June 2011, he captained Greece at the 2011 European T20 Championship Division Two tournament, with the side finishing sixth overall after losing to Spain in the fifth-place playoff.

== Personal life ==
His son Blake Nikitaras has also played first-class cricket for New South Wales cricket team.
