= Blake Nikitaras =

Australian cricketer (born 2000)

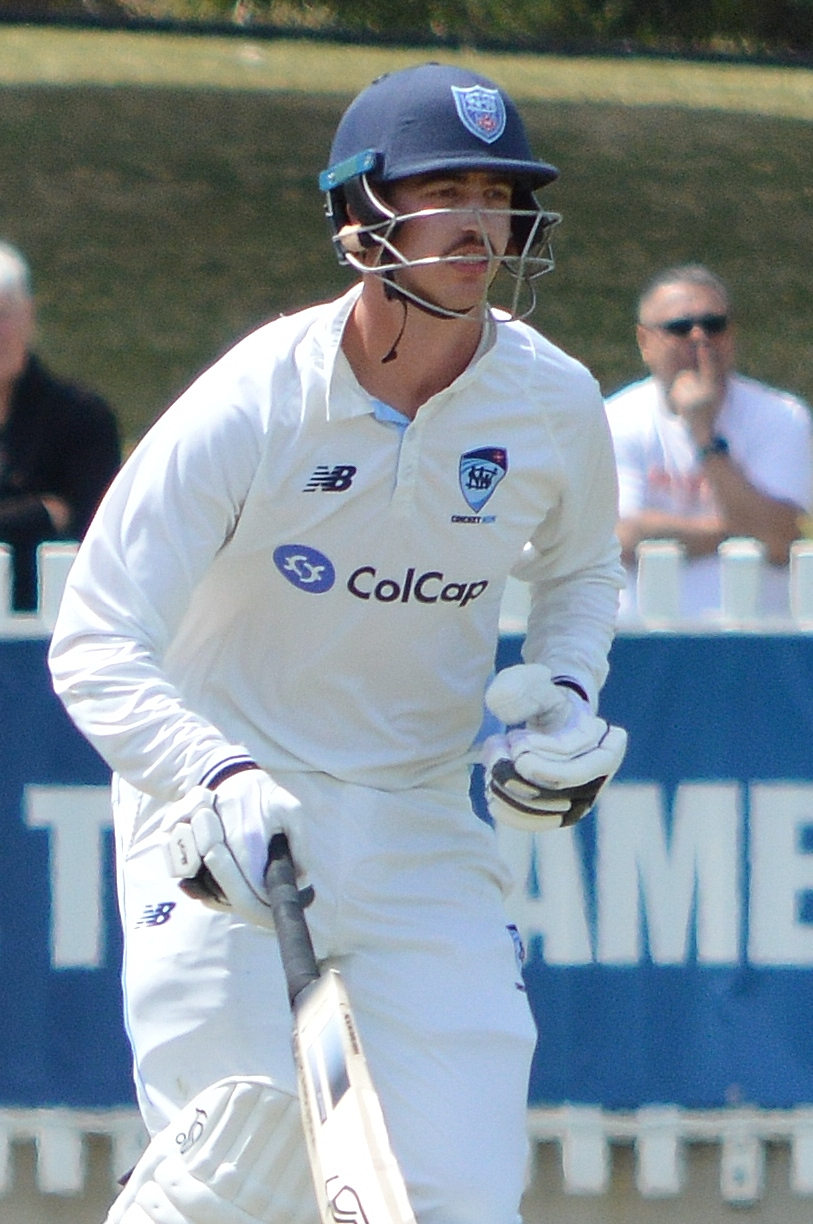
- Nikitaras playing First Class cricket with New South Wales in October 2025

Personal information
- Born: 29 April 2000 (age 26); Mount Lawley, Western Australia
- Batting: Left-handed
- Bowling: Left-arm medium
- Role: Batter
- Relatives: Steve Nikitaras (father)

Domestic team information
- Years: Team
- 2021/22–2025/26: New South Wales (squad no. 45)
- 2022/23–present: Sydney Thunder (squad no. 47)

Career statistics
Competition	FC	LA	T20
Matches	18	2	3
Runs scored	738	25	9
Batting average	22.36	12.50	4.50
100s/50s	0/3	0/0	0/0
Top score	56	20	8
Catches/stumpings	8/–	1/–	1/–
- Source: Cricinfo, 17 October 2025

Blake Nikitaras (born 29 April 2000) is an Australian cricketer who plays for New South Wales and Sydney Thunder. He is a left-handed batsman. He is the son of former state cricketer Steve Nikitaras.

== Early life ==
Nikitaras is of Greek descent. Nikitaras is from Oak Flats in the Illawarra region of New South Wales. He plays for St George Cricket Club in NSW Premier Cricket.

== Career ==
Ahead of the 2020-21 season Nikitaras injured his anterior cruciate ligament playing a friendly game of basketball and missed the majority of the season instead rehabbing for months at the Australian Institute of Sport in Canberra.

In March 2022 Nikitaras made his first-class debut for New South Wales scoring 44 and 56 against the South Australia cricket team in the Sheffield Shield. This earned him a rookie deal with NSW for the 2022-23 season.

In December 2022 Nikitaras was given a contract for the Big Bash League with Sydney Thunder.

Nikitaras was delisted by New South Wales at the end of the 2025-26 season.
