= Aerobics Oz Style =

Australian exercise television show

- Created by: Harry Michaels
- Directed by: Harry Michaels; Craig Tinett; Erik Steen
- Starring: Taryn Noble (née Polovin); Mia Baker; June Jones; Erin Jayne Gard; Helen Tardent; Wendi Carroll; Kate McCracken; Anton Scott
- Opening theme: "I Feel Love" by The Fan Club (1991—1993) "Right Here, Right Now! (Move It)" by Paul Zorzi (1995—1999) "Happy Ever After" by U NO HU
- Country of origin: Australia
- Original language: English
- No. of seasons: 24
- No. of episodes: 6,000+

Production
- Executive producer: Harry Michaels
- Producers: Greg Howes; David Ward
- Production locations: Sydney, New South Wales
- Camera setup: Multi-camera
- Running time: 22 minutes (ecl. commercials)
- Production companies: Zero1Zero; Silk Studios

Original release
- Network: Network Ten (1982–1990, 1994–2005); Seven Network (1991–1993)
- Release: 1982 – 2005

Aerobics Oz Style is an Australian aerobic exercise instructional television series, shown in Australia on weekends and then weekdays on Network Ten at 6:00 am till 6:30 am. It then featured on the Seven Network at 10:30 am from 1991–1993 before returning to Network Ten from 1994. The show has been distributed to many other countries. It was cancelled by Network Ten at the end of 2005.

== TV series background ==
Aerobics Oz Style, was created and produced by Harry Michaels and began in 1982 and ran continuously through until 2005, with over 4,500 episodes produced, by production company Zero1Zero (now NEP Studios). The format remained consistent throughout its run. Each show was 30 minutes divided into four segments, one of warmup exercises, two main exercise segments, and a stretch/cool-down segment. One instructor leads the exercises, with four demonstrators following to the side and behind. Later shows were shot outdoors at scenic locations around Sydney, in earlier shows an indoor studio was used.

=== Format ===
Each show had an exercise theme. The mainstays since inception included high and low-impact, legs, abdominals, body toning. Other later themes included kick-boxing, low impact with a mixture of Latin dancing and pilates. Older styles included light hand weights and dynabands. Fashions in exercise-wear moved with the times too, leotards over bicycle shorts in the early days giving way to halter tops and tight shorts.

The instructors and demonstrators on the show were a mixture of men and women. The show was intended for any age or gender.

Many children watched the series inadvertently as they had switched on their televisions too early for the popular children's series Cheez TV which aired after.

== Tie-in Merchandise ==
During most of the show's run, a set of Aerobics Oz Style exercise videos are sold in a longer format than the shows broadcast, and include some exercise styles not otherwise featured, such as Swiss ball. These videos included music that remained unique and separate from the television show. In total, 22 titles were released.

== Theme music ==
Australian band TISM parodied Aerobics Oz Style in their 1998 music video for "Whatareya?", in which all members start off following the instructor before drinking (and throwing) beer cans and jumping over couches.

In 1998 U NO HU, a UK songwriting and music production duo, consisting of Gary Williams and Philip Barber were brought onboard and commissioned to write a mixture of more than three hundred instrumental dance tracks and chill-out tracks specifically for the television broadcasts and later exercise videos. The new, uplifting, music featured on over 1,500 later shows increased viewer ratings by twenty percent – on the BSkyB network – adding to the already established popularity of the program.

== Current broadcasts ==
AOS continues to be broadcast on Australian television via Aurora Channel 183 – on the Foxtel Digital, Optus and Austar platforms – which broadcasts Aerobics Oz Style every day at 6.30am AEST and also 2.00pm AEST. In Europe Aerobics Oz Style is broadcast daily (weekends included) on Sky Sports 1 or Sky Sports 2 at 6:00 (GMT) and it is repeated daily on Sky Sports 3 or Sky Sports 4 at 11:30 and 16:30. In 2011 Sky Sports started to broadcast additional airings of the show. The program is now aired in the small hours of the morning, as early as, 00:30 (GMT).

== Talent ==
- June Jones – (1983–2005) – instructor and demonstrator, a founding member of the show
- Wendi Carroll – (1990–2005) – instructor and demonstrator
- Michelle Dean – instructor and demonstrator
- Taryn Noble (née Polovin) – (1998–2005) – instructor and demonstrator
- Helen Tardent – (2000–2005) – instructor for the pilates shows, joined the series with the introduction of those shows. Tardent was previously a professional dancer at the London Royal Academy of Dance and now owns and operates a Pilates studio in Double Bay, Sydney
- Kate McCracken – (2002–2005) – demonstrator and dancer
- Erinjayne Gard – (2000–2005) – demonstrator
- Jodie Low – (1996–2002) – demonstrator, winner of the 1996 Miss Fitness Australia title
- Amanda Breen – instructor and demonstrator – rumoured to take over Trainer role on Biggest Loser Australia, Now Director – People & Culture at Les Mills Asia Pacific
- Anton Scott - instructor and demonstrator - was a two-time gold medalist in the National Aerobic Championships (1993, 1994) and a silver medalist at the World Aerobics Championships.
