= Michael Kyrios =

Australian clinical psychologist

Michael or Mike Kyrios (born 30 December 1958) is a Greek-Australian academic and clinical psychologist specialising in mental health and wellbeing. While sustaining clinical responsibilities throughout his career, in later years he worked mostly within university settings. He has held various teaching, research and administrative positions at several universities and established centres of research in mental health across Australia, and has worked closely with philanthropic and mental health consumer bodies. He holds honorary positions in various universities where he has worked, as well as the South Australian Health and Medical Research Institute (SAHMRI).

He is currently an emeritus professor at Flinders University, after serving as vice-president and executive dean at the university's College of Education, Psychology and Social Work.

== Introduction ==
In addition to his role at Flinders University, Kyrios was previously a professor at the Australian National University and the director of its Research School of Psychology, and president of the Australian Psychological Society from 2014 to 2016. Other previous appointments include Swinburne University of Technology and the University of Melbourne.

His research focuses on areas such as obsessive–compulsive disorder (OCD), behavioral addictions, anxiety, and depression. He has led research in understanding the role of the self in psychological disorders and in psychological treatments. More recently, he has developed approaches to coping mentally and facilitating wellbeing during the coronavirus pandemic. With colleagues from the South Australian Health & Medical Research Institute, they have developed interventions to improve wellbeing, anxiety and depression.

Notably, he has developed effective online treatments for OCD and hoarding.

Over his career, he has attracted over $34 million in research funding and has over 180 publications in his areas of expertise, in addition to his publications about the profession of Psychology.

According to ScholarGPS, he is amongst the top 0.5% scholars in the world in the area of Obsessive Compulsive Disorder where he is 40th globally, and in the area of Anxiety.

== Career ==
Kyrios' initial career was mainly as a clinician at the Royal Melbourne Hospital, although he maintained academic links to the Faculty of Medicine and the Department of Psychiatry at the University of Melbourne. His academic career took greater focus when he transferred to the Department of Psychology at the University of Melbourne and then to Swinburne University where he set up research institutes in mental health. His next career move was to the Australian National University in Canberra and, finally, to Flinders University in Adelaide where he maintained close links to the South Australian Health & Medical Research Institute.

Throughout his career, he has been a leader within the Psychology profession in Australia. He received the 2013 Ian M Campbell Memorial Prize in Clinical Psychology from the Australian Psychological Society (APS) and 2011 Presidential Citation for Excellence from the American Psychological Association’s Society for General Psychology. He is a former President of the APS, former National Chair of the APS College of Clinical Psychologists, and currently sits on the Orygen Youth Mental Health Research Committee. He was elected a Fellow of the APS in 2007 and an Inaugural Fellow of the Australian Association of Cognitive and Behavioral Therapy in 2016. He has undertaken editorial responsibilities for global leading journals and sat on national (e.g., National Health and Medical Research Council, Medical Research Futures Fund) and international grant review panels. He was Scientific Chair for the 2010 International Congress of Applied Psychology and the 2016 World Congress of Behavioral and Cognitive Therapies.

Following his retirement from Flinders University in 2021, he undertook a period of overseas travel, and in 2023 began working with the Australian Educational Management Group (AEMG) where he now holds the position of Vice President (Quality and Compliance) and Chair of the Academic Senate. He is also a Board Member and Chair of the Academic Board of the Australian Institute of Future Education (AIFE) and works as an independent consultant on research and academic matters.
