= The Greek Herald =

Daily Greek community newspaper in Australia

- Type: Daily Newspaper
- Format: Broadsheet
- Owner(s): Foreign Language Press Ltd.
- Founder(s): George Marsellos and John Stilson
- Publisher: Dimitra Skalkos
- Founded: 16 November 1926; 98 years ago
- Headquarters: Sydney, Australia
- Website: greekherald.com.au

The Greek Herald (Ellinikos Kirikas) is the largest and one of the oldest daily Greek community newspapers in Australia. The newspaper is published by Foreign Language Press Ltd.

== History ==
Founded by George Marsellos and John Stilson the newspaper was originally published as a broadsheet under the name Panellenios Keryx (Panhellenic Herald). Its first edition, published on 16 November 1926, was entirely in English; its other seven pages were in Greek.

"Our aim is primarily to enlighten our fellow-countrymen, the Greeks, in this noble country, and particularly those who have not had the advantage of long residence on these shores. For this reason our paper is not the organ of any party, class or faction. Our sole aim was to enlighten and educate. We are absolutely and sincerely non-artisan. We neither support nor condemn any particular party, and our watchword will be Truth, Right and Justice to all," partners George Marsellos and John Stilson announced in their first edition.

The Greek Herald remains the second oldest Greek Australian newspaper behind Okeanis (Ocean), which was founded in 1913 and renamed the Ethnikon Vema (National Tribune) in 1920.

== Ownership ==
The Greek Herald reached its biggest height under Foreign Language Publication, run by former head publisher Theo Skalkos for over 40 years. During his time as head publisher, Theo produced around 12 ethnic newspapers under Foreign Language Publication, becoming the largest ethnic print business in Australia.

Following the death of Theo Skalkos on 20 May 2019, publishers Dimitra Skalkos and Elaine Kintis took over publication of The Greek Herald.

== Digitisation ==
The Greek Herald's digital platform was launched in December, 2019. The platform is one of the largest digital Greek news publications in Australia.

First issue of the Panellenios Keryx, now known as the Ellinikos Kirikas (The Greek Herald in English). Published on 16 November 1926.

== Publication owner ==
Publication owner
| Head Publisher | Year of Ownership |
|---|---|
| George Marsellos and John Stilson | 16 November 1926 – April 1933 |
| Dimitrios Lalas | April 1933 – 1939 |
| Alexander Grivas | 1939 – January 1971 |
| Theo Skalkos | January 1971 – 2019 |
| Elaine Kintis | 2019 – 2022 |
| Dimitra Skalkos | 2019 – Incumbent |
