= Katherine Chronis =

American performance artist

- Occupation: Performance artist
- Known for: The Get Naked Project

Katherine Chronis is an American performance artist who initiated The Get Naked Project in August 2000. This involves her appearing naked in public throughout America and documenting these appearances with a series of photographs. Her performances involve walking around and doing mundane tasks in public with no clothes on. She often travels with someone who records her actions and interactions with people on video or photos. She claims this serves to desexualize female nudity and makes it less taboo.

She grew up in Uptown, Chicago, a child of Greek immigrant parents. She dropped out of high school and started a job cocktail waitressing, at one point having four jobs a once. She suddenly quit all jobs. She started doing open mics at the Roxy around 1988. She moved to New York and worked with an artist's collective called the Collective Unconscious on the Lower East Side. She worked with Mainline Productions, and was married to actor Joe Larocca. She sees her nude work as just stripping layers off herself, and that nudity is just the most obvious metaphor for that.

She appeared at Chicago's The Fillet of Solo Festival in 2014 performing in The Dookie Award a solo piece written and performed by herself.
