= Christopher Chronis =

Australian fashion designer

- Born: 30 September 1961 (age 65); Melbourne, Australia
- Other name: Chris
- Occupation: Fashion designer
- Spouse: Christine Mavridis (m. 1997-2025 )
- Children: 1
- Website: www.christopherchronis.com.au

Christopher Chronis (born 29 September 1961 in Melbourne, Australia) is an Australian fashion designer. Chronis has designed men's and women's fashions under the Christopher Chronis Designs, Gas Station and Christos fashion labels. He is now the head designer of Global Designer Brands.

== Stand-alone stores ==
Chronis opened his first store in Chapel Street, South Yarra. Other stores were opened in the Melbourne, Sydney, New Zealand and the United Kingdom. His fashions have also been sold by other retailers including major department stores. He launched his signature fragrance Christos in 1998 and has also used the CCD brand on a number of café and restaurant ventures. In 2000 after Chronis was on the brink of financial ruin the stores were seized by receiver KPMG, Mr Chronis reported that his business would be rescued by a group of investors, Tony Mokbel with associate Jack Smit, borrowed $1.4 million to buy designer Christopher Chronis's business. Christopher is the head of design for Global Designer Brands, has designed for the Playboy Icon luxury evening-wear collection for men and women and has also opened Playboy concept boutiques in Australia, New Zealand and a London flagship store in Oxford Street.

There are three Christopher Chronis stores in Melbourne (Chapel Street, GPO and Chadstone), one in Oxford Street Sydney, one in Auckland and one in Oxford Street, London. Christopher is now the head of design for Global Designer Brands, has designed for the Playboy Icon luxury evening-wear collection for men and women and has also opened Playboy concept boutiques in Australia, New Zealand and a London flagship store in Oxford Street.

== Awards ==
- The Australian Fashion Industry Awards 1993 Mens PM /Gala wear.
- The Australian Fashion Industry Awards 1994 Mens PM/Gala wear.
- The Australian Fashion Industry Awards 1995 Mens weekend wear.
- The National Australian Print Award 1997 for best catalogue category.
