= Marino (name) =

Marino is an Italian surname and a given name of Latin origin meaning "of the sea".

== Geographical distribution ==
As of 2014, 44.8% of all known bearers of the surname Marino were residents of Italy (frequency 1:718), 22.1% of the United States (1:8,584), 6.4% of Argentina (1:3,490), 3.5% of Brazil (1:30,415), 3.2% of Cuba (1:1,908), 3.0% of the Philippines (1:17,883), 2.8% of Mozambique (1:5,167), 2.2% of Mexico (1:30,089), 1.5% of France (1:23,643), 1.1% of Australia (1:11,857) and 1.0% of Canada (1:18,803).

In Italy, the frequency of the surname was higher than the national average (1:718) in the following regions:

1. Calabria (1:211)
2. Sicily (1:216)
3. Campania (1:315)
4. Basilicata (1:384)
5. Molise (1:689)

In Cuba, the frequency of the surname was higher than the national average (1:1,908) in the following provinces:

1. Las Tunas Province (1:551)
2. Holguín Province (1:669)
3. Santiago de Cuba Province (1:926)
4. Isla de la Juventud (1:1,135)
5. Guantánamo Province (1:1,319)

In Argentina, the frequency of the surname was higher than the national average (1:3,490) in the following provinces:

1. Buenos Aires (1:1,777)
2. Buenos Aires Province (1:2,339)
3. Formosa Province (1:2,843)

== List of persons with surname ==
- Antigone Marino, Italian physicist
- Dan Marino (born 1961), American football player
- Eugene Antonio Marino (1934–2000), American archbishop
- Frank Marino (born 1954), Canadian rock guitarist
- Giambattista Marino (1569–1625), Italian poet
- Giuliana Marino (born 1986), German model
- Ignazio Marino (born 1955), Italian surgeon and politician and former Mayor of Rome
- John Marino (born 1997), American ice hockey player
- Joseph Marino (born 1953), archbishop and Vatican diplomat
- Juan Carlos Marino (Argentine politician) (born 1963), Argentine politician
- Ken Marino (born 1968), American actor, comedian, director and screenwriter
- Miguel A. Marino, American
- Putri Marino (born 1993), Indonesian actress, model, presenter
- Rebecca Marino (born 1990), Canadian tennis player
- Roger Marino, American engineer and businessman
- Stanislao Marino (born 1951), Italian-born Venezuelan Christian singer
- Stefano Marino (born 2004), German footballer
- Steve Marino (golfer) (born 1980), American golfer
- Ted Boy Marino (1939–2012), Italian-born Brazilian actor and wrestler
- Tom Marino (born 1952), American politician

== List of persons with given name ==
- Marino (footballer, born 1939), full name Marino da Silva, Brazilian football winger
- Marino (footballer, born 1986), full name Marino da Silva, Brazilian football midfielder
- Marino Baždarić (born 1978), Croatian basketball player
- Marino Bifulco (born 1982), Italian football player
- Marino Biliškov (born 1976), Croatian footballer
- Marino Bizzi (1570–1624), Dalmatian prelate of the Roman Catholic Church
- Marino Busdachin (1956–2023), Italian politician and human rights activist
- Marino Capicchioni (1895–1977), Italian musical instrument maker
- Marino Cardelli (born 1987), San Marinese alpine skier
- Marino Casem (1934–2020), American football coach and athletic administrator
- Marino Curnis (born 1973), Italian traveller
- Marino Drake (born 1967), Cuban high jumper
- Marino Facchin (1913–1979), Italian boxer
- Marino Faliero (1285–1355), Italian doge of Venice
- Marino Finozzi (born 1961), Italian politician
- Marino Franchitti (born 1978), Scottish race car driver
- Marino Girolami (1914–1994), Italian film director
- Marino Grimani (1489?–1546), Italian Cardinal and papal legate
- Marino Hinestroza (born 2002), Colombian soccer player
- Marino Keith (born 1974), Scottish footballer
- Marino Keulen (born 1963), Belgian politician
- Marino Kobayashi (born 1994), Japanese cyclist
- Marino Lejarreta (born 1957), Spanish cyclist
- Marino Lucas (1869?–1931), Greek–Australian businessman
- Marino Magrin (born 1959), Italian football player
- Marino Marini (sculptor) (1901–1980), Italian sculptor
- Marino Marini (musician) (1924–1997), Italian musician
- Marino Miyata (born 1991), Japanese beauty pageant
- Marino Moretti (1885–1979), Italian poet and author
- Marino Morettini (1931–1990), Italian road bicycle and track cyclist
- Marino Morikawa (born 1977), Peruvian-Japanese environmental scientist
- Marino Morosini (1181–1253), Italian doge of Venice
- Marino Nicolich (1910–?), Italian football player
- Marino Perani (1939–2017), Italian football player
- Marino Pieretti (1920–1981), Italian–American baseball player
- Marino Rahmberg (born 1974), Swedish football player
- Marino Santana (born 1972), Dominican baseball player
- Marino Sato (born 1999), Japanese racing driver
- Marino Tartaglia (1894–1984), Croatian painter and art teacher
- Marino Vagnetti (1924–?), Sammarinese politician
- Marino Vanhoenacker (born 1976), Belgian triathlete
- Marino Vigna (born 1938), Italian cyclist
- Marino Vrgoč (born 2015), Croatian singer
- Marino Zorzato (born 1956), Italian politician

== See also ==
- Marinus (disambiguation)
- Marin (name)
- Morino (surname)
- Marino (disambiguation)
