= Nicolich =

Nicolich is a surname. Notable people with the surname include:

- Janice Nicolich (1935–1996), American housewife killed in car accident by a drunk driver
- Marino Nicolich (1910–?), Italian footballer
