= Bifulco (surname) =

Bifulco is an Italian surname. Notable people with the surname include:

- Alfredo Bifulco (born 1997), Italian footballer
- Marino Bifulco (born 1982), Italian footballer who plays as a goalkeeper
