= Winblad =

Winblad or Vinblad is the Swedish and Danish word for "wine leaf" or grape leaf.

== People ==
- Frideborg Winblad (1869–1964), Swedish educator
- Ann Winblad (born 1950), American software executive
- Anton Julius Winblad (1828–1901), music director for Ytterlännäs
- Janice Ann Winblad (1935–1996), Nebraska Supreme Court case

== In fiction ==
- Ulla Winblad, fictional character
