= The Capitol, Melbourne =

Historic theatre in Melbourne, Victoria, Australia

The Capitol
- RMIT Building 113
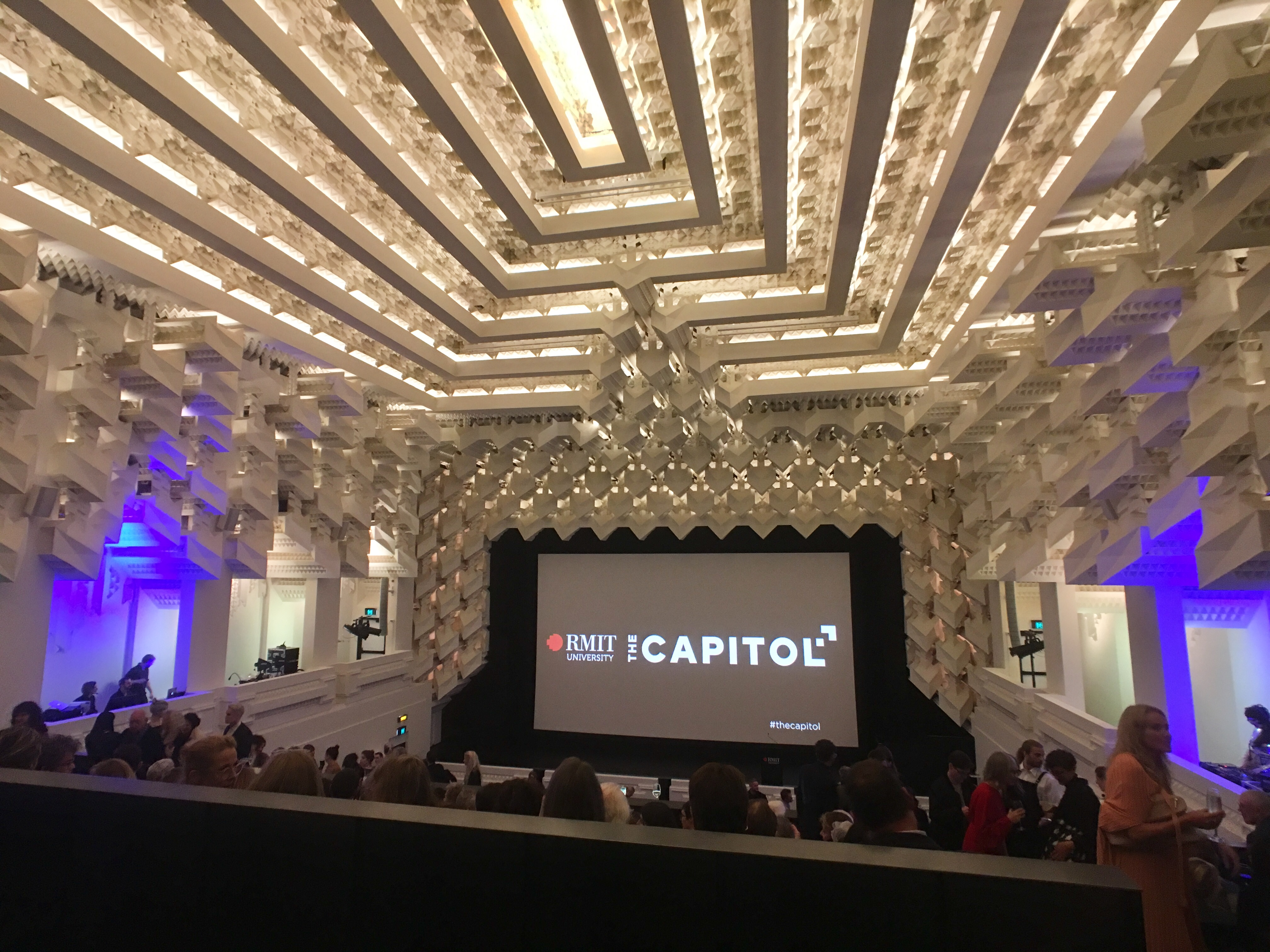
- Auditorium ceiling
- Interactive map of The Capitol
- Address: 113 Swanston Street; Melbourne, Victoria, Australia
- Coordinates: 37.81536°S 144.96636°E
- Owner: RMIT University
- Capacity: 554 and 8 accessible spaces
- Designation: Victorian Heritage Register
- Current use: Education, events

Construction
- Opened: 1924
- Architects: Walter Burley Griffin; Marion Mahony Griffin

The Capitol is a theatre on Swanston Street in the central business district (CBD) of Melbourne, Victoria, Australia. Opened in 1924 as part of the Capitol House building, the theatre was designed by American husband and wife architects Walter Burley Griffin and Marion Mahony Griffin. It is the oldest of Melbourne's large picture palaces and is known for its extravagant decor and abstract motifs, including an intricate geometric ceiling containing thousands of coloured lights designed to evoke the walls of a crystalline cave.

Proposals in the early 1960s to demolish the theatre sparked one of Australia's first major heritage conservation campaigns, co-led by architect and critic Robin Boyd, who called the Capitol "the best cinema that was ever built or is ever likely to be built". While the cinema was saved, its seating capacity was reduced and parts of the original ground level foyer were replaced by a shopping arcade. RMIT University purchased The Capitol in 1999 for use as a lecture theatre, and in 2014 it was closed to undergo an extensive five-year restoration and upgrade. The Capitol reopened in 2019 and has since hosted various film festival screenings, theatrical performances, live music and other events.

The Capitol is registered with the Australian Heritage Council, the National Trust of Australia and Heritage Victoria, which describes its avant-garde design as "extremely unusual in the realm of theatres and cinemas worldwide" and "a technical triumph".

== History ==
=== Construction ===
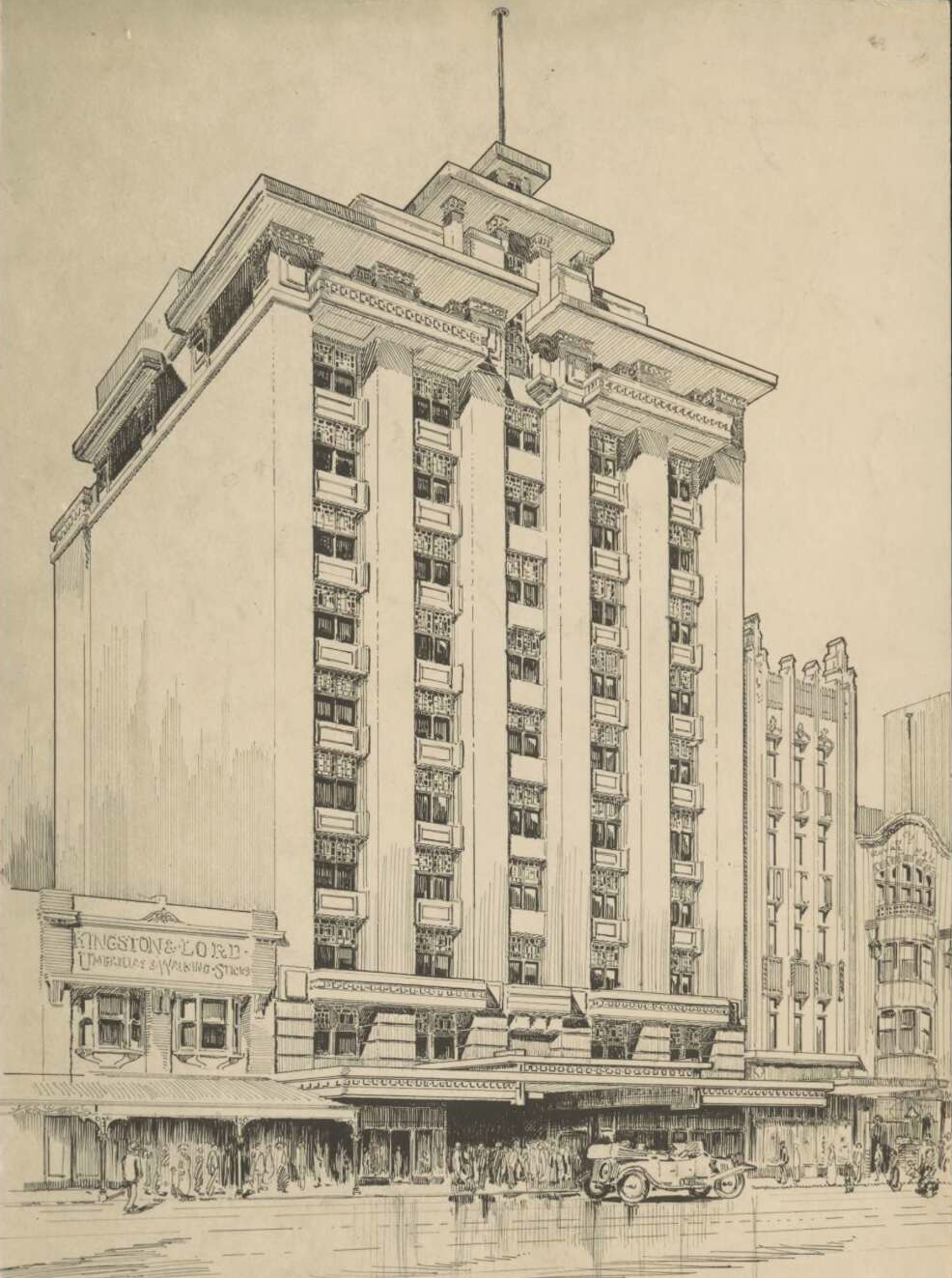
Drawing of the building

The Capitol Theatre was commissioned by a group of Melbourne businessmen, including the Greek Consul-General Antony J. Lucas and the American-born Phillips brothers, who had previously developed Luna Park and the adjacent Palais Theatre in St Kilda. The architects were WB Griffin with Peck & Kemter, but the design is attributed to American husband and wife architects Walter Burley Griffin and Marion Mahony Griffin, known for her work on interiors. Lucas had worked previously with the Griffins on the development of both the Vienna Cafe in 1916 and then his own property Yamala in Frankston, and the Phillips’ had worked with them on the interior of St Kilda's Palais de Danse.

Marino Lucas, brother of J. J. Lucas, had previously built the Majestic Theatre in Launceston, which at the heights of the Great War became the most profitable cinema in Tasmania. Centrally located within the Launceston tramway network on a main street, the Majestic's phenomenal success may have influenced Lucas' decision to construct a centrally positioned theatre in Melbourne.

The official plans for the Capitol were submitted for approval on 21 November 1921, with approval granted on 9 February 1923, and construction completed in 1924. It was officially opened on 7 November 1924. The theatre was part of a larger a mixed-use complex, known as Capitol House, incorporating shops at ground level, a basement cafe, a 10 storey office tower perched above the lobbies, with the main part of the auditorium projecting out behind. The office tower is described as Chicagoesque style, with vertical proportions and a prominent cornice. The theatre itself was immediately considered an architectural masterpiece, and quite unique.

It is no use trying to describe it. A hundred visits would be necessary to study every feature of this wonder building, and by then you would have to start all over again. On the first night people simply stared.

— Table Talk, 1924

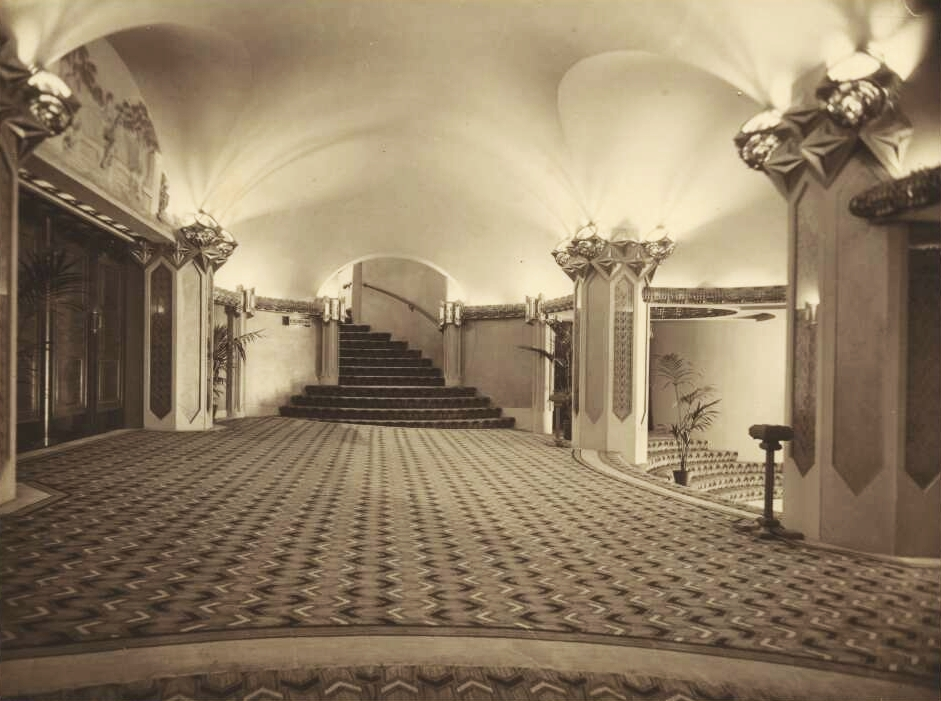
Entrance lobby

The building is noted for its unusual mixed uses, and for the structural design that allowed them to co-exist, as well as for the daring cantilever of the concrete street verandah, but it is the geometric plaster ceiling of the theatre auditorium that is the most outstanding feature. Composed of angular crystalline forms in molded plaster, it was based on organic design principles from 'the natural world' and are composed in a way which is both evocative of a glittering cave, while it is also distinctly modern. The ceiling plasterwork incorporated hidden lighting of about 4000 coloured globes in red, yellow, blue and green, which could be controlled from a central point to produce different effects, used on their own and in conjunction with the original orchestral scores in the early silent film era to add drama for the spectator.

The Capitol was also the home of the first large Wurlitzer Organ to come to Australia. The Wurlitzer was used to provide music and sound effects for the films, when the orchestra was not used. After "sound" films took over it was used for musical entertainment in between shows. It was frequently broadcast on the ABC and remained in regular use until the mid 1950s. Originally seating 2137 (stalls 1306, balcony 633, loges and boxes 198), it was altered during the 1930s, with the seating capacity reduced to 2115 people, and a wider proscenium.

=== Saved from demolition ===
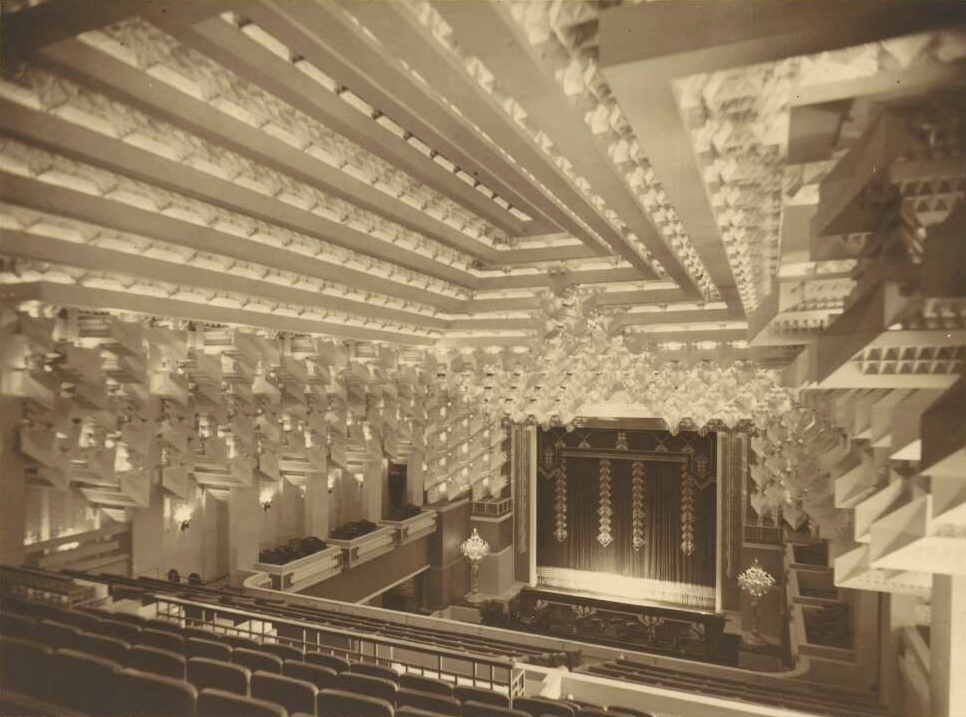
View of the theatre with its famous ceiling

After the advent of television in the late 1950s, cinema audience numbers everywhere dwindled dramatically and in the early 1960s Hoyts Theatres let their lease expire. Contemporary architecture was sweeping through Australian cities, and many older buildings, then considered passé, were demolished in an attempt to "modernise" the city centre—this move, considered a "self-conscious" attempt to impress international visitors, would attract much criticism in later decades. The result was that the theatre had to close. Almost immediately there was a campaign waged to 'save the Capitol' by the National Trust and a group of prominent architects, notably Robin Boyd, who called the Capitol "the best cinema that was ever built or is ever likely to be built".

A compromise was soon reached: after closing for extensive renovations on 17 November 1963, the street foyer and stalls area were demolished to make way for a shopping arcade, now known as the Capitol Arcade, whilst retaining the ceiling and upper half of the auditorium to create a single-level cinema seating 600. The stage was raised within the proscenium by about 6m, with the balcony seating extended down to this new level, and a new foyer created above the arcade, under a void that was part of the dress circle foyers which originally opened to the rear stalls. The dress circle foyers were retained but subdivided off and given over to new uses. The Wurlitzer organ was removed and relocated to the Dendy Cinema in Brighton in 1967. The reconfigured Capitol Theatre reopened on 16 December 1965 under the control of Village Cinemas.

The opening film after the renovation was The Great Race, which had a run of two years. Other long running engagements over the years included the films Ryan's Daughter (1970), The Towering Inferno (1974), A Star Is Born (1976) and Superman: The Movie in 1978. With the opening of the Village Cinema Centre in nearby Bourke Street in 1988, Village relinquished their lease.

Through the 1990s the cinema was in use by sporadically for films festivals, art house screenings, and Chinese and Indian language films.

=== Recent history ===
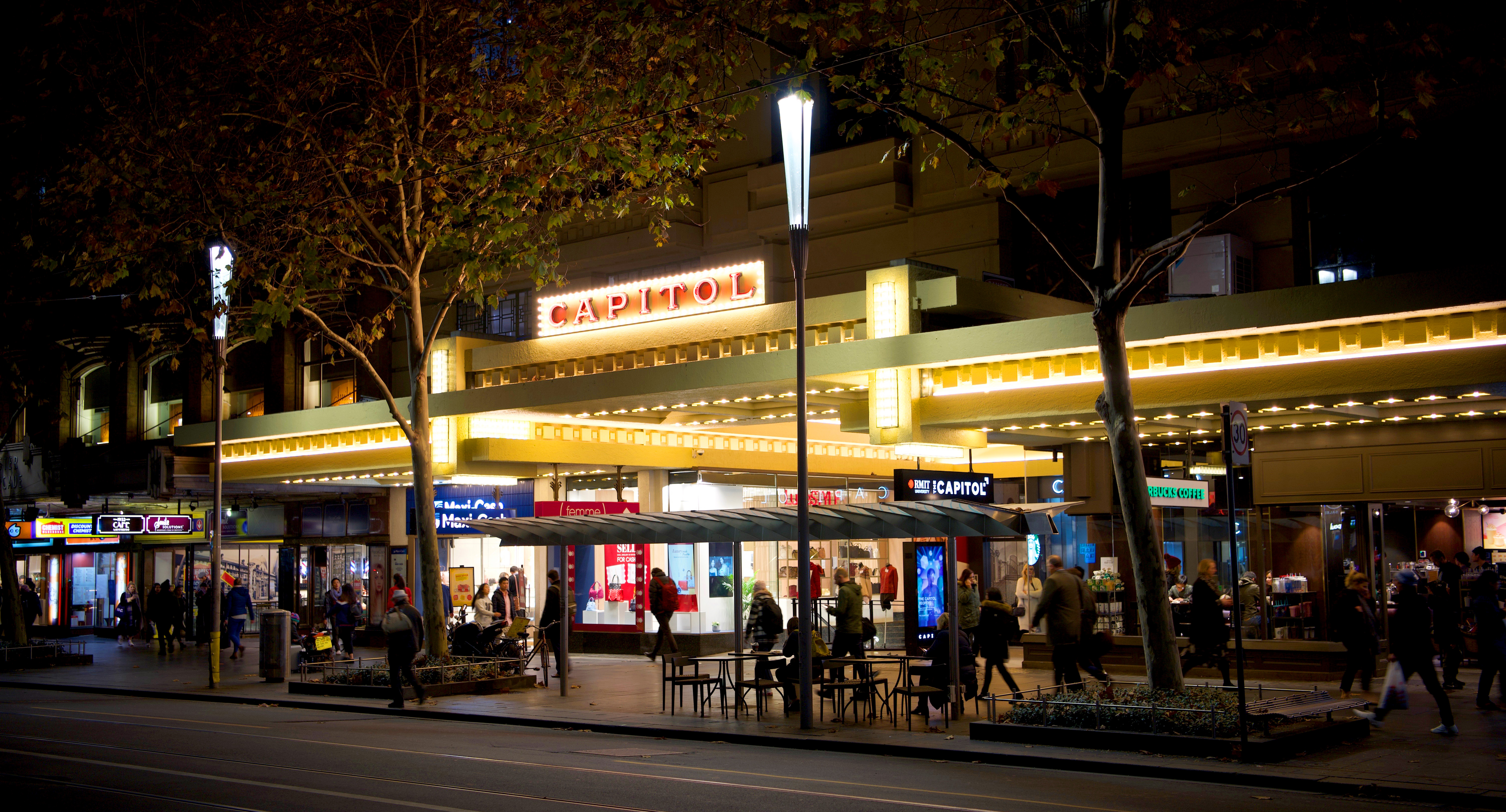
The Capitol, reopened in 2019 after its refurbishment

In 1998, the Melbourne city council hired Melbourne architecture firm Six Degrees to undertake a study that would explore the possibility for the theatre to be used as a festival and arts based centre. In 1999, RMIT University acquired the space in part to preserve the heritage of the building, but also to use it as a large CBD-based lecture theatre. They elected to keep Six Degrees as the project architects, and conservation architect Michael Taylor. Their purchase included the blocked off dress circle lobbies as well as the main auditorium and the 1960s foyer, and the renovation plans sought to re-connect all the foyer areas (including demolishing a concrete floor that subdivided the dress circle lobby in two), as well as giving the building an overall safety upgrade, and disabled access. The budget for this work was $2,200,000 and included audio-visual installations and theatre lighting systems, some restitution of the coloured lighting of the ceilin,g and new lift and disabled access.

In 2005, RMIT announced that the theatre had received a A$190,000 grant from the Victorian State Government towards further repairs to the crystalline ceiling.

Free public tours were held from 2000 to 2010, ending due to dwindling participants. In 2014, the work needed to restore The Capitol Theatre became so substantial that the building closed to the public. In 2017, an appeal was launched by RMIT to reactivate the landmark. At the same time, the owners of the arcade decided to employ Six Degrees to refurbish the arcade in a complementary fashion, completed in May 2019.

This was to be the first full restoration of the iconic venue, with new services, upgraded access including a disabled lift, new seating, and state of the art projection equipment for all media. All the decorative plaster in the auditorium and foyers was cleaned, repaired and repainted, carpets recreated based on original samples, and the decision was made to replace the hard to maintain coloured globe lighting of the main auditorium with LED lighting, able to be programmed in an infinite variety of configurations and sequences.

The restored theatre opened on 3 June 2019 to great fanfare.

After 54 years, the original Wurlitzer organ, named "Eliza", was returned to The Capitol from Dendy Cinemas Brighton in 2021. RMIT University and the organ’s owner, the Theatre Organ Society of Australia, are raising $500,000 to fund its reinstallation.

The Capitol is registered with the Australian Heritage Commission, the National Trust of Australia (Victoria) and Heritage Victoria.

== Gallery ==
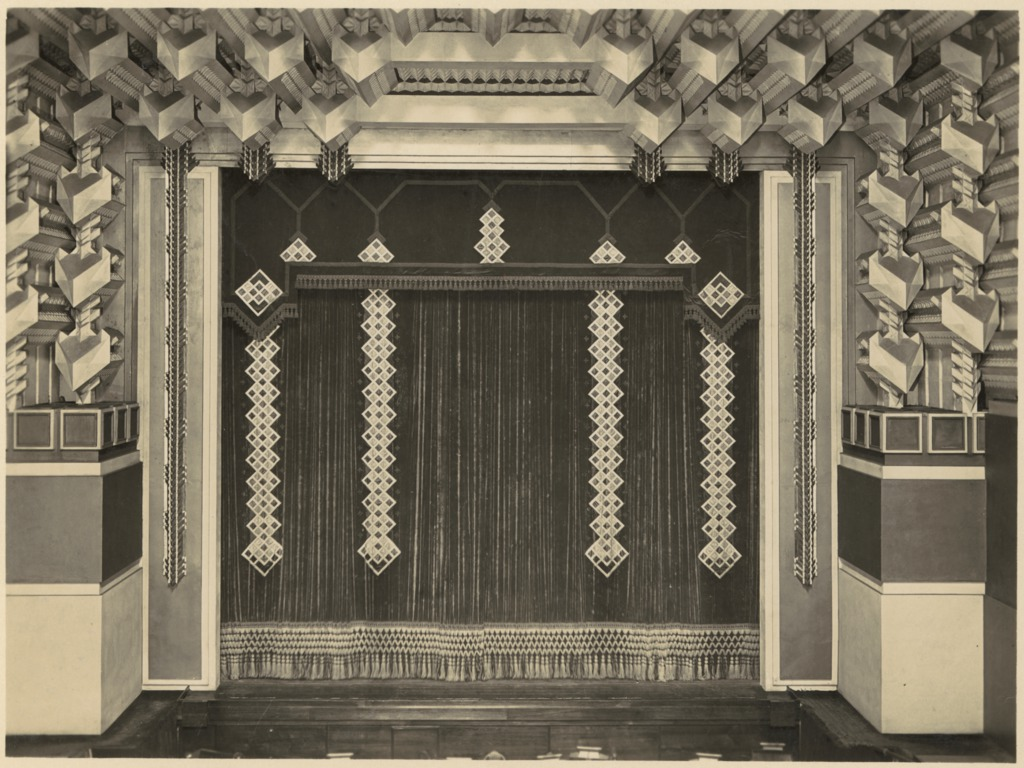
Curtain and stage area decorations

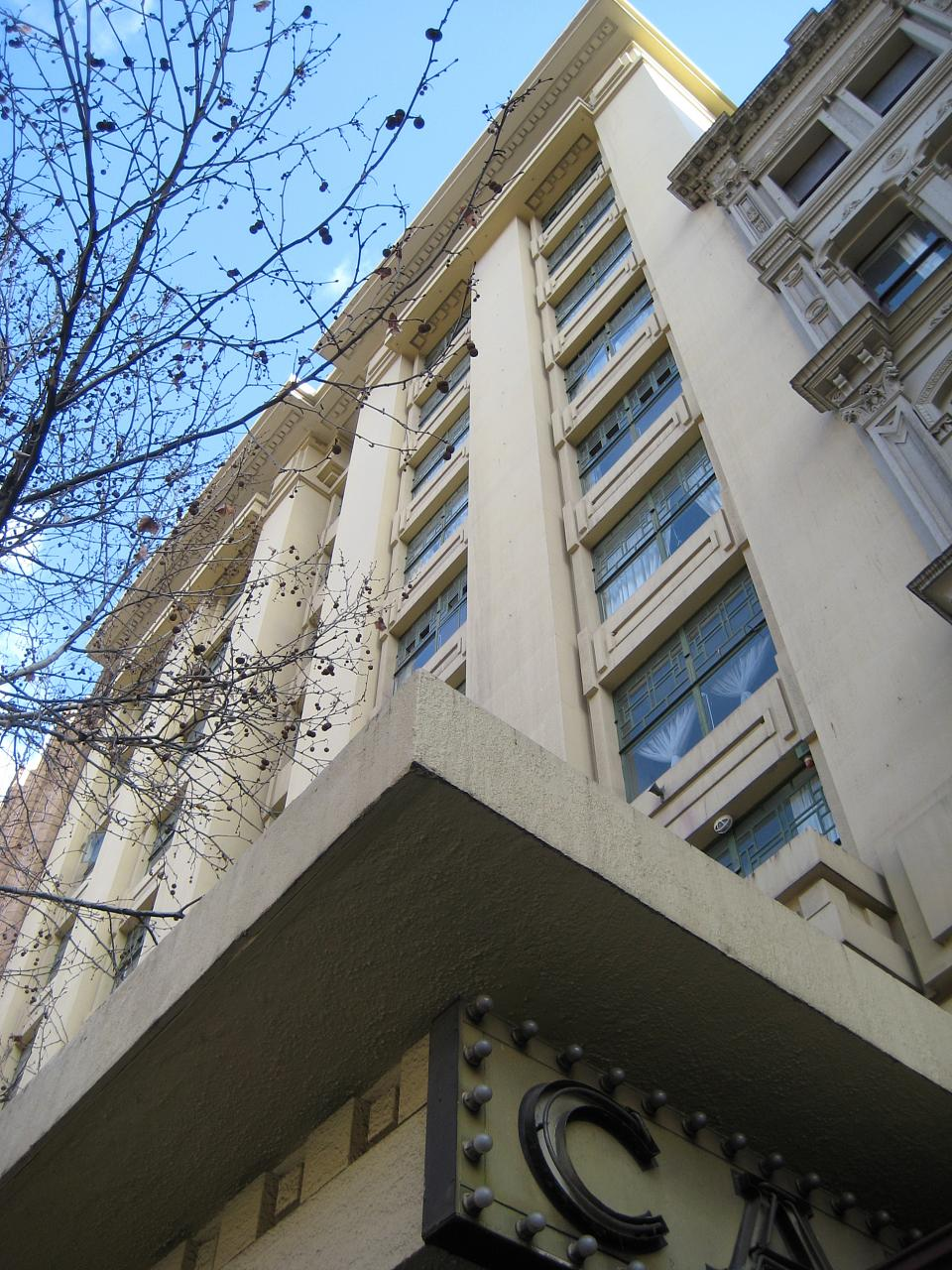
The Capitol building, 2012

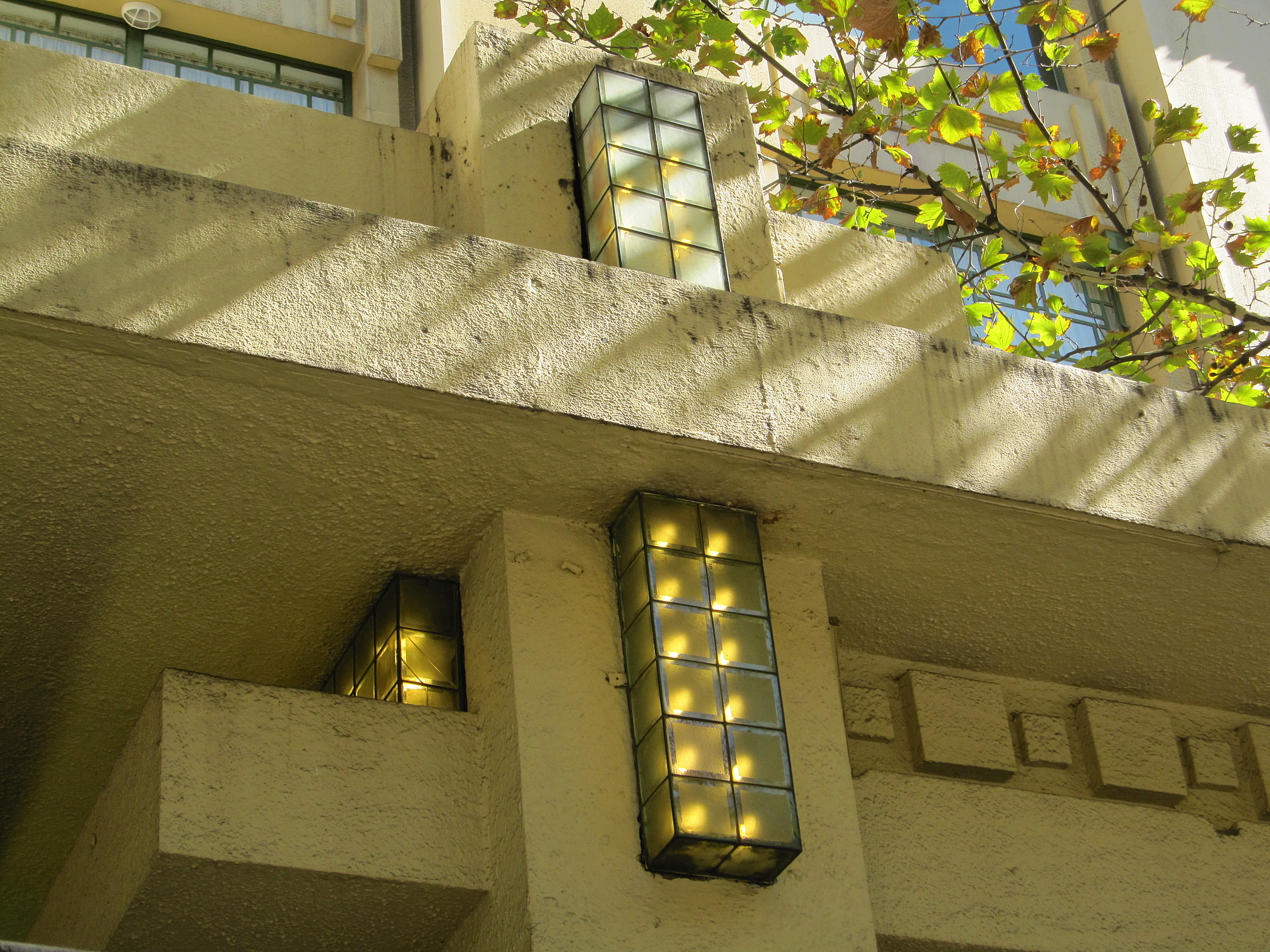
Exterior detail

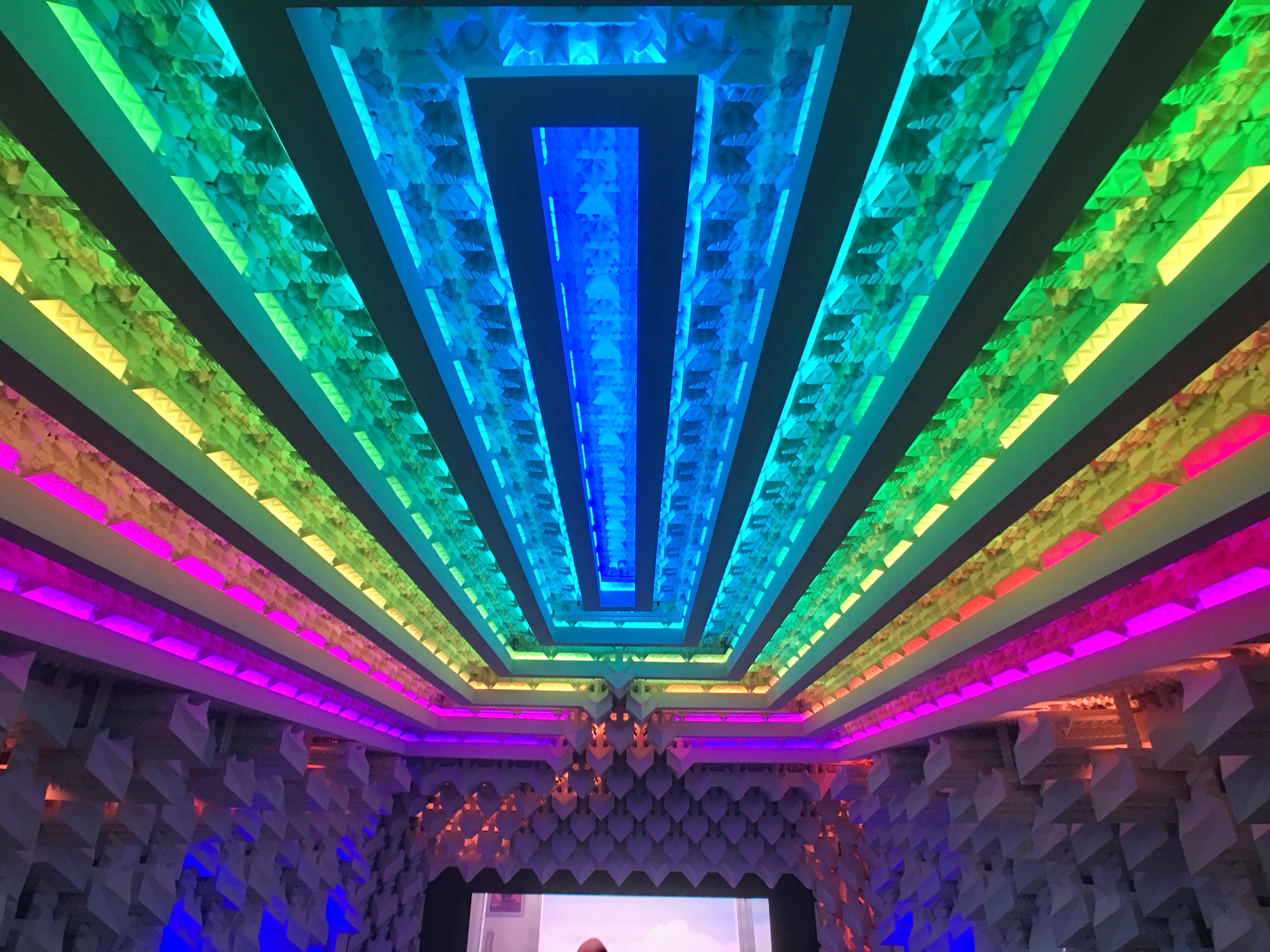
The Capitol with LED lighting in 2019

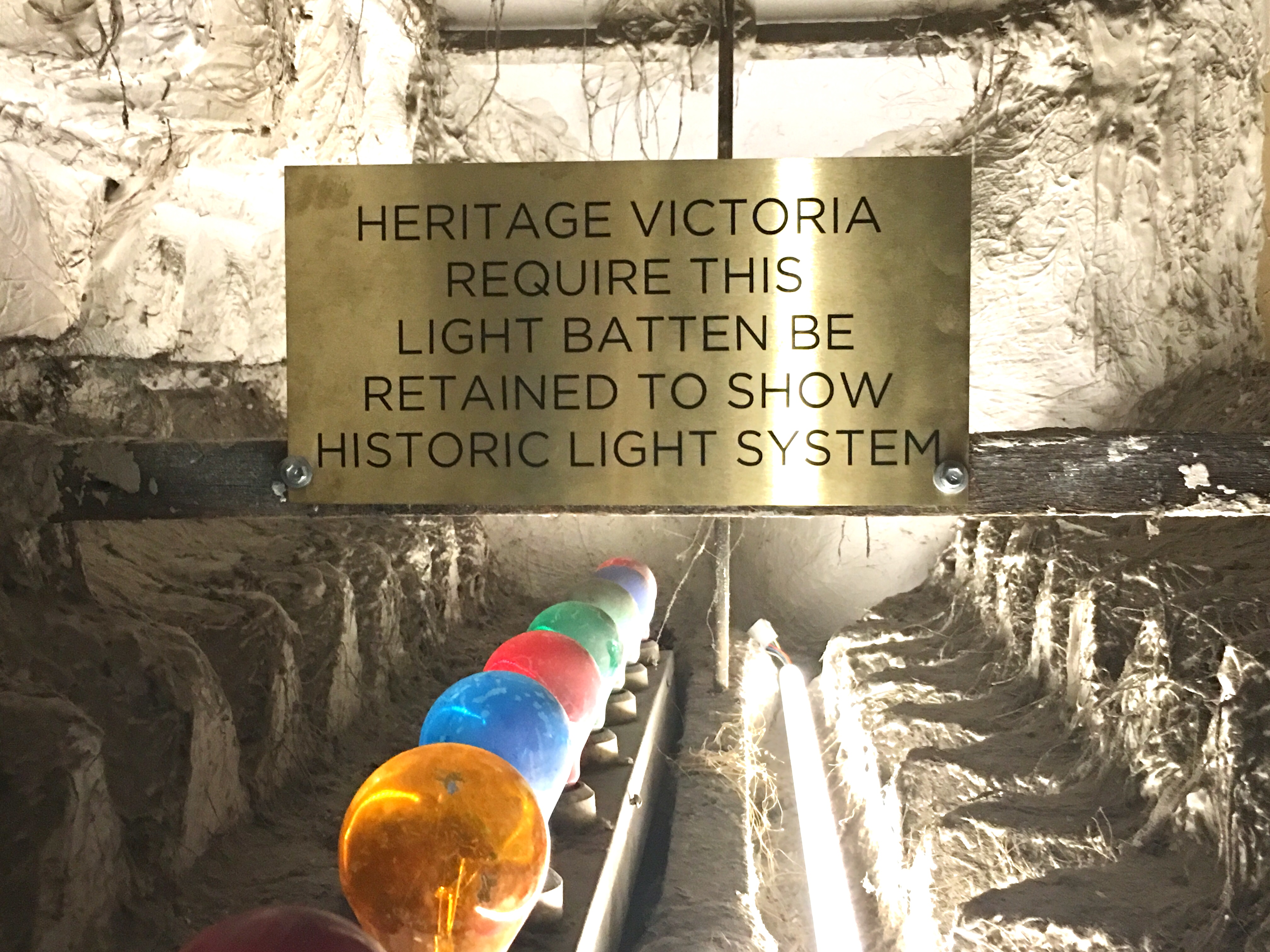
Original lights

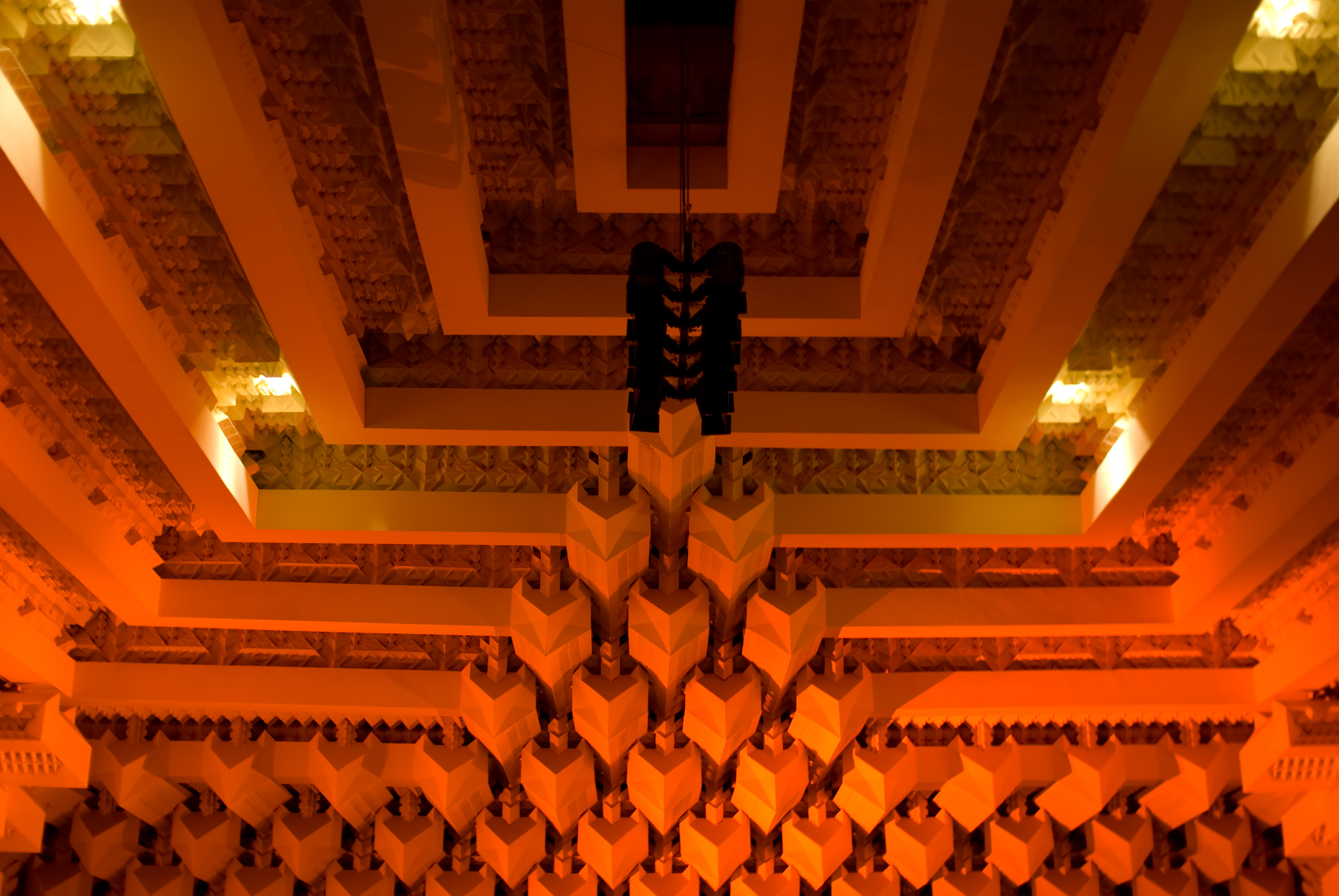
Detail of the ceiling

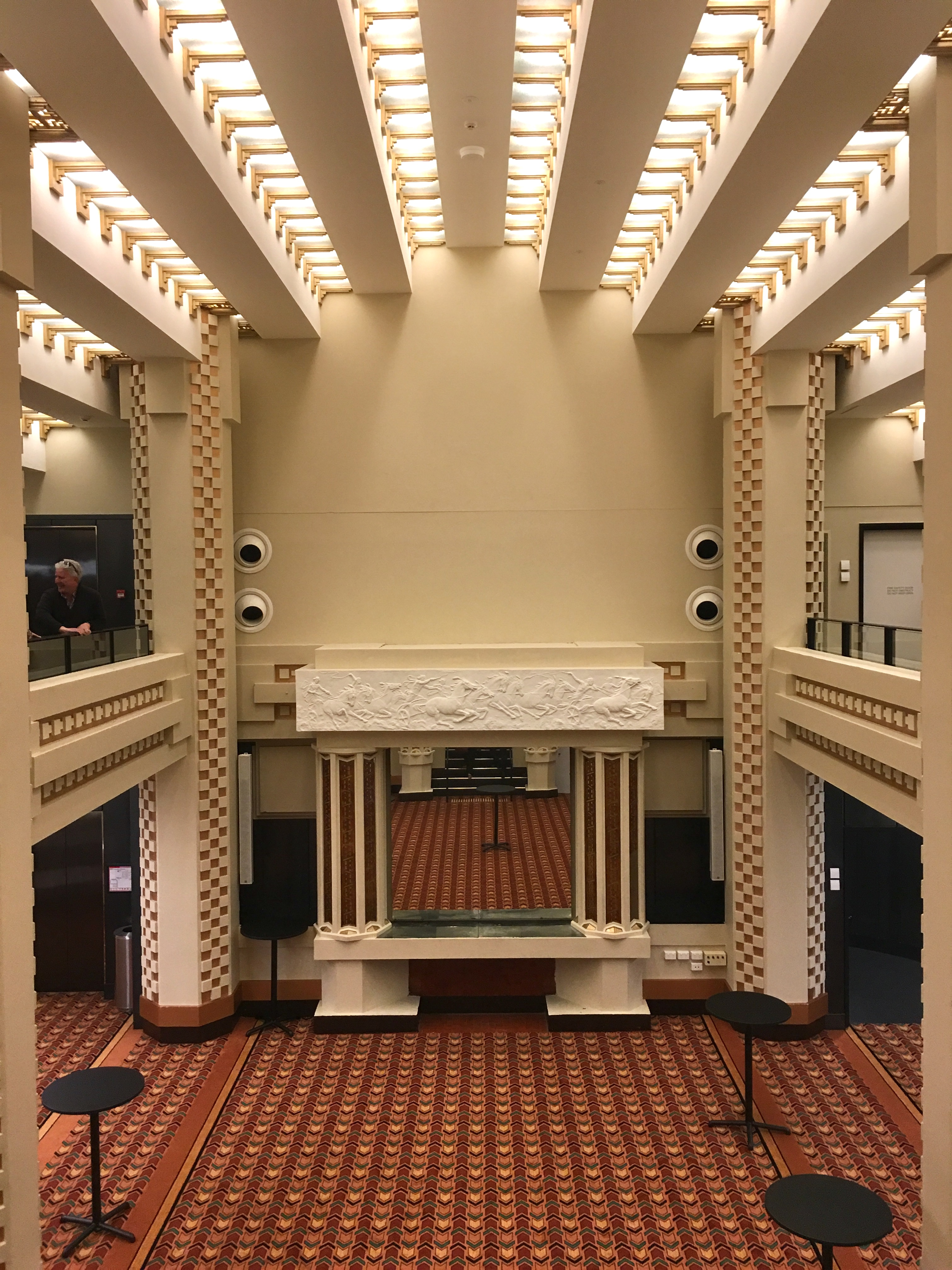
Balcony lounge

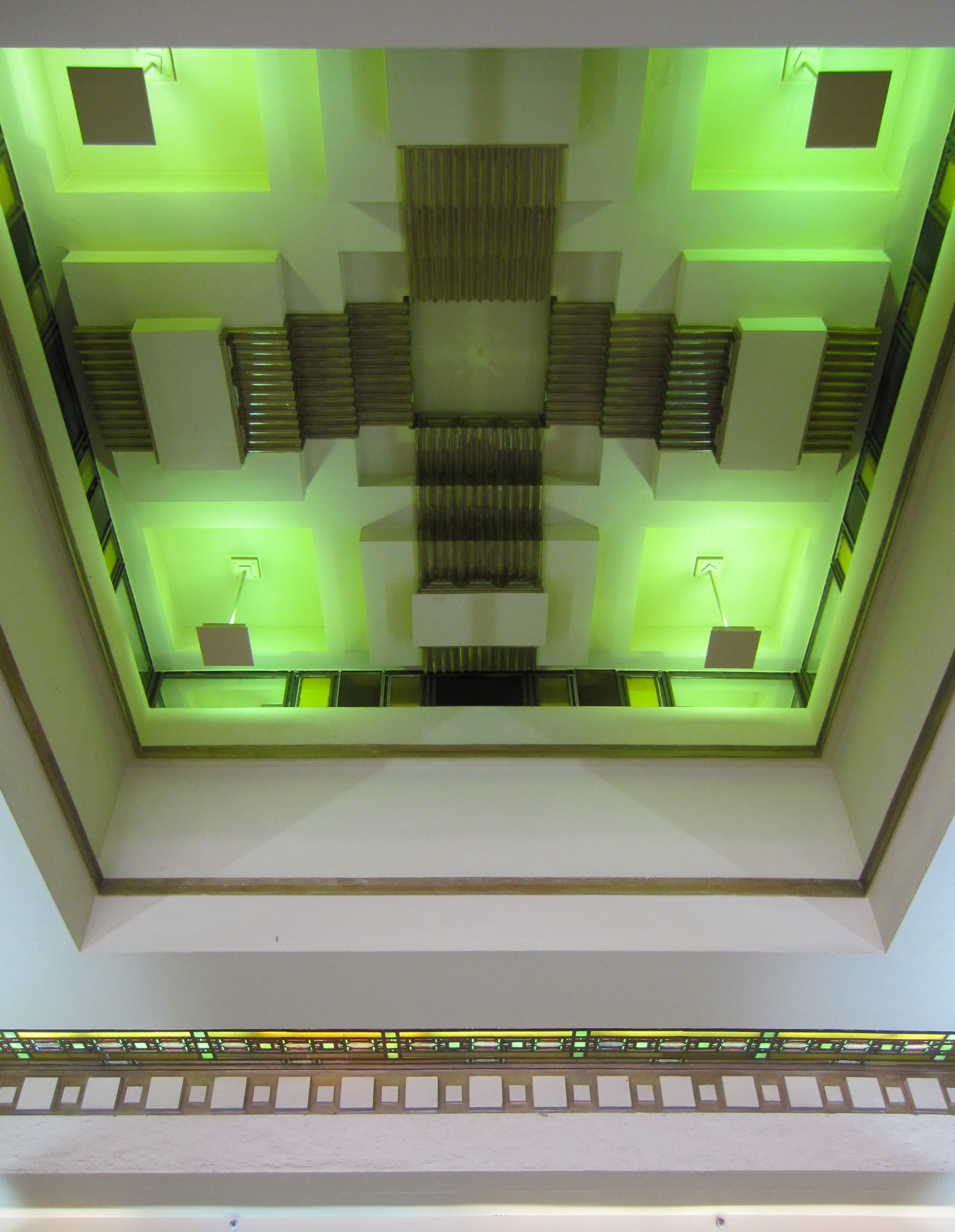
Foyer ceiling detail

== See also ==
- Movie palace
- Walter Burley Griffin
- Marion Mahony Griffin
- Robin Boyd
- Palais Theatre
- Heritage Victoria
