= Andreas Lekatsas =

Andreas Lekatsas (Greek: Αντρέας Λεκάτσας) was a Greek who was a native of the Greek island of Ithaca and was one of the first Greeks to migrate to Australia. He arrived in Melbourne before 1851 and initially moved to the goldfields of Ballarat. He soon found wealth, and a return journey to Ithaca inspired his nephews Anthony JJ Lucas and Marino Lucas to also move to Australia. Andreas may have taken part in the Eureka Stockade uprising, as the following passage from the Ithacan Philanthropic Society details.

Indeed a number of Ithacans went on to Melbourne after the gold-fields to make a living there. Andreas Lecatsas from Exoghi, Ithaca is said by his descendants to have jumped ship in 1851 to join the gold rush. Later he prospered as a Melbourne shop-keeper and returned to Ithaca some 20 years later to inspire some of his nephews to emigrate. Indeed, one nephew Antonios Lekatsas heeded his advice to see the new El Dorado and landed in Melbourne in 1877. It is said, but not authenticated that Andreas Lecatsas was present at the diggers’ stand at the Eureka Stockade near Ballarat in 1854.

The Lekatsas family (the name anglicised to Lucas) 'subsequently pioneered high-class restaurants in Melbourne'.
