= Princess Theatre, Launceston =

Theatre in Launceston, Tasmania

Princess Theatre
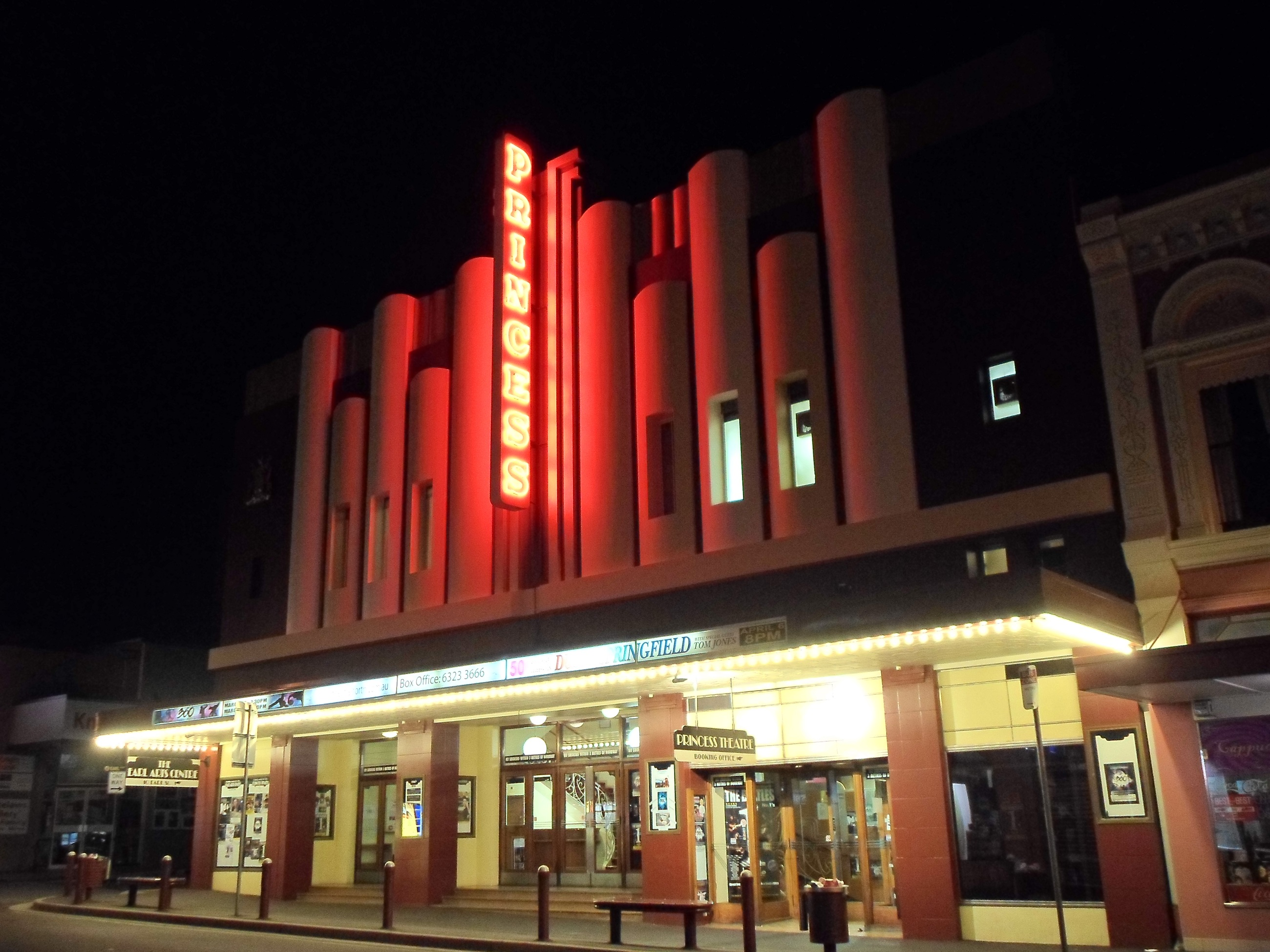
- The Princess Theatre at night in 2013
- Interactive map of Princess Theatre
- Address: 57 Brisbane Street; Launceston, Tasmania; Australia
- Coordinates: 41°26′10.06″S 147°8′28.14″E
- Owner: Theatre North
- Capacity: 1,770 (1911); 944 (2022)

Construction
- Opened: 30 July 1911; 115 years ago
- Years active: 1911–present
- Architects: Marino Lucas (1911), Charles Neville Hollinshed (1939)

Website
- Official site

Tasmanian Heritage Register
- Place ID: 3,887
- Status: Permanently Registered

The Princess Theatre is a historic theatre in Launceston, Tasmania, Australia.

== History ==
Located on the corner of Brisbane Street and Earl Street, the Princess Theatre was commissioned and designed by Greek–Australian businessman Marino Lucas at a cost of £A15,000 in 1911. The Princess was designed to be used exclusively as a "picture palace" and held capacity for 1,770 patrons (700 seats in the front stalls, 500 seats in the back stalls, 450 seats in the dress circle and 120 in the orchestra pit). The stage was designed to accommodate first-class theatre productions, running the full width of the building, 21 by 18 metres (70 ft × 60 ft). The orchestra pit held ten professional musicians, known as the "Princess Symphony Orchestra". All the work, except the stamped metal ceilings, was completed by Messrs J & T Gunn in Launceston, including a feature Tasmanian Blackwood staircase, lighting, carpets and its proscenium, described in The Examiner as "strikingly handsome, bronze, gold wine colour, as well as delicate shades of green and blue".

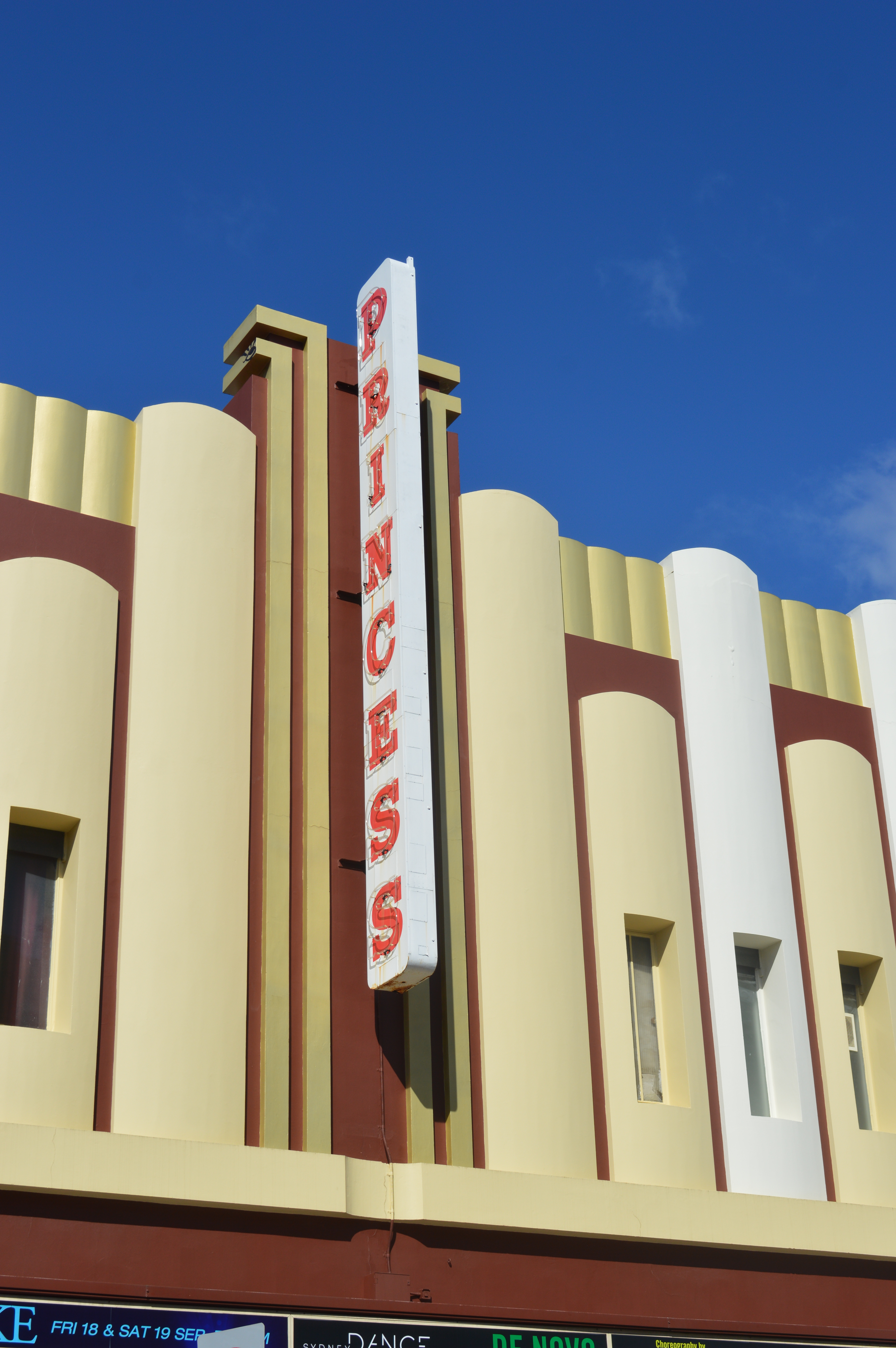
The theatre was remodelled in 1939, resulting in its tubular streamline moderne appearance

In 1939 the National Theatres Corporation hired architect Charles Neville Hollinshed to remodel the Princess Theatre, at a cost of £A11,000. Hollinshed had previously worked under Thomas W. Lamb in New York, contributing to the designs of the Capitol Theatre on Broadway and Albee Theatre in Brooklyn. The facade of the theatre was reconstructed, and the entrances altered and modernised. The Blackwood staircase was replaced, the central auditorium dome was removed and capacity was reduced by 150 patrons.

In 1953, the Princess exhibited its first 3D film, House of Wax, the first 3D feature with stereophonic sound. At a conversion cost of £A10,000, Cinemascope was installed at the Princess in 1954. The biblical epic The Robe was exhibited simultaneously at the Princess Theatre and Prince of Wales Theatre, Hobart in October 1954, marking the first dual city film premiere in Tasmania.

Due to the rise of television ownership, the next 14 years saw the Princess, neighbouring Majestic and Lyceum theatres operate with heavily reduced patronage. None of these venues would continue operations as cinemas into the 1970s. Newer cinematic experiences hindered the older venues; opening on 10 October 1957, the Village Drive-In at Mowbray Racecourse became the largest Drive-In in Tasmania with capacity for 877 cars. The Plaza Theatre on George Street was demolished in 1964.

Following the sale of the National Theatre in 1969, the Launceston City Council purchased the nearby Princess Theatre for $71,000. It re-opened on 17 November 1970 as a live theatre venue with the Royal Australian Ballet. In attendance included Tasmanian Governor General Sir Paul Hasluck and British ballet dancer Dame Peggy van Praagh. The theatre has since hosted performances by AC/DC, Roy Orbison, Slim Dusty, Kiri Te Kanawa, Harry Secombe, Little River Band, Bo Diddly and Leo Sayer.

The Launceston City Council formed the current operator, Theatre North, in 1998.

== Earl Arts Centre ==
Located on Earl Street, the Earl Arts Centre opened in 1993 directly behind the Princess Theatre. A black box theatre accommodating 184 patrons, the theatre was designed for a variety of purposes, ranging from theatre and dance in an intimate setting, to film screenings and conference sessions.

== Restoration plans ==
The Tasmanian Liberal Party announced a plan to invest $2.5 million to restore the Princess Theatre if the Federal Government was reelected in the 2022 elections. In January 2025 the Federal Government committed $12.7m towards the $30m redevelopment project for the theatre. The Princess Theatre and Earl Arts Centre closed late 2025 with construction beginning early 2026. These theatres are planned to reopen early 2028. These restorations are planned to refresh the space, add accessibility, improve backstage facilities, enhance performance and production facilities, renew the Earl Arts Centre, upgrade the safety and compliance of these theatres and secure the future of a cultural landmark.

== See also ==
- List of theatres in Hobart
