= 260 Collins =

Collins Arcade
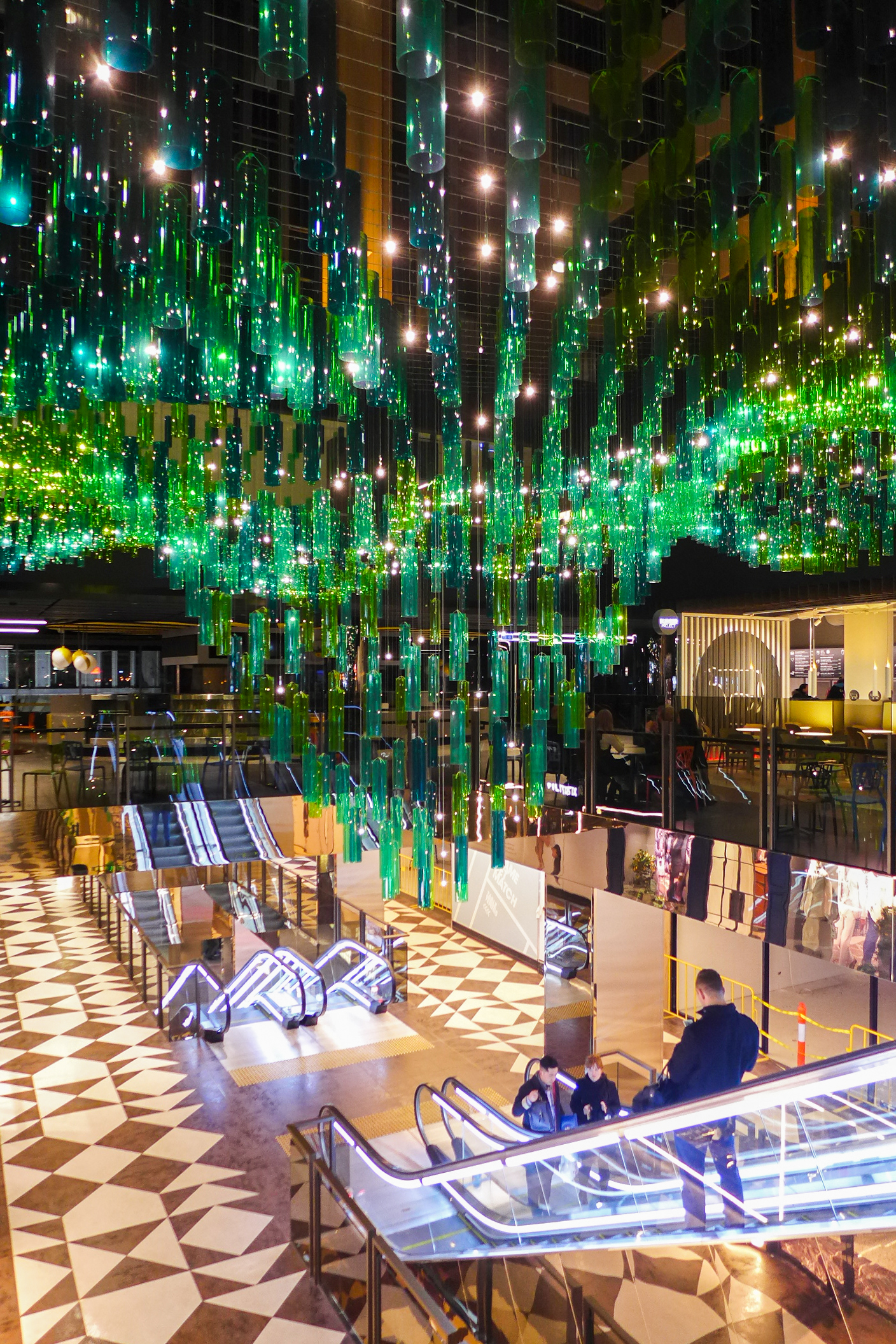
- St. Collins Lane Atrium (2017)
- Location: Melbourne, Australia
- Coordinates: 37.8159°S 144.9649°E
- Address: 260 Collins Street
- Opened: 2016
- Developer: LaSalle Investment Management
- Manager: JLL
- Owner: UBS
- Architect: ARM Architecture
- Floors: 4
- Website: stcollinslane.com.au

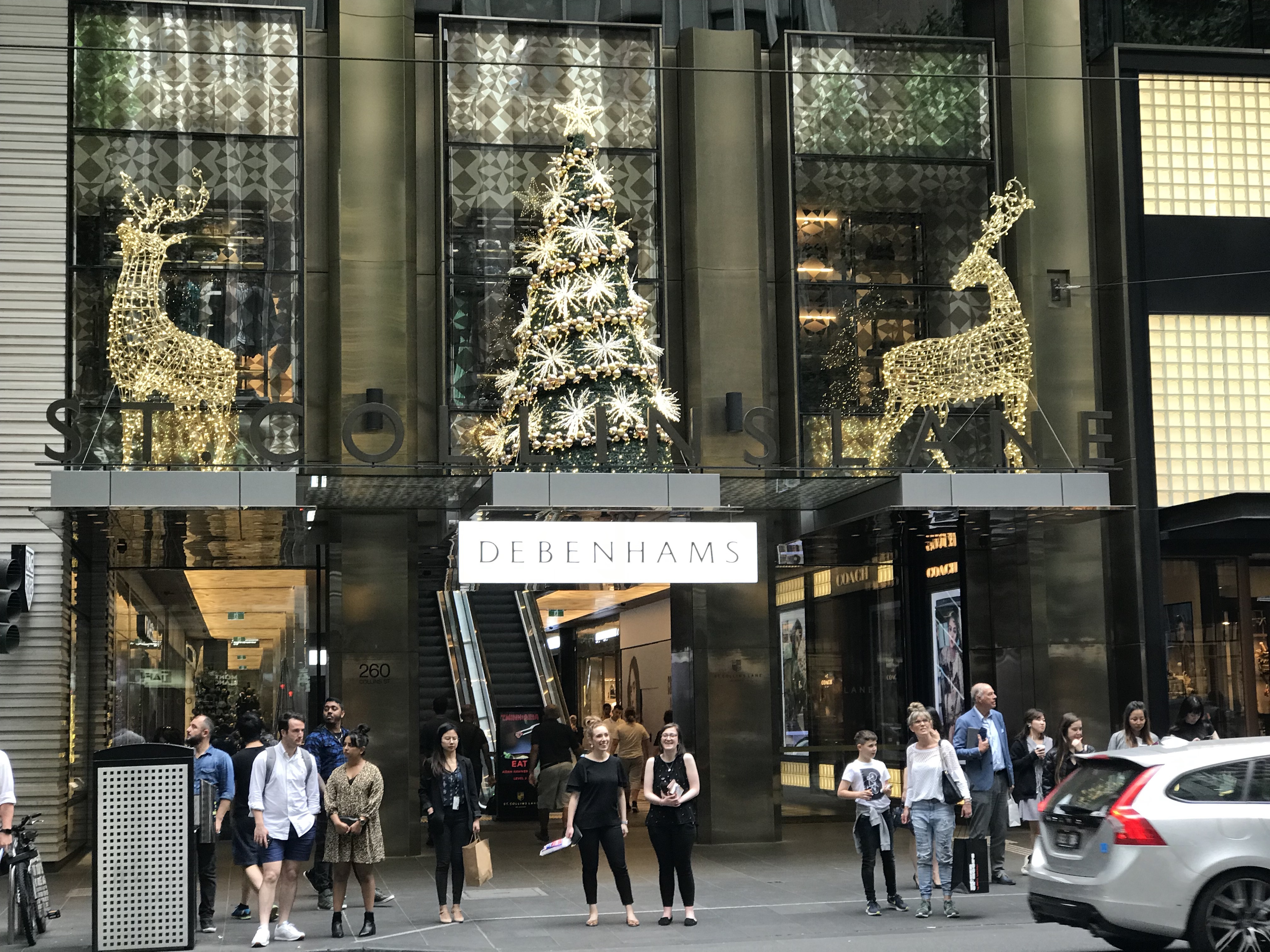
Collins Street entrance in December 2018)

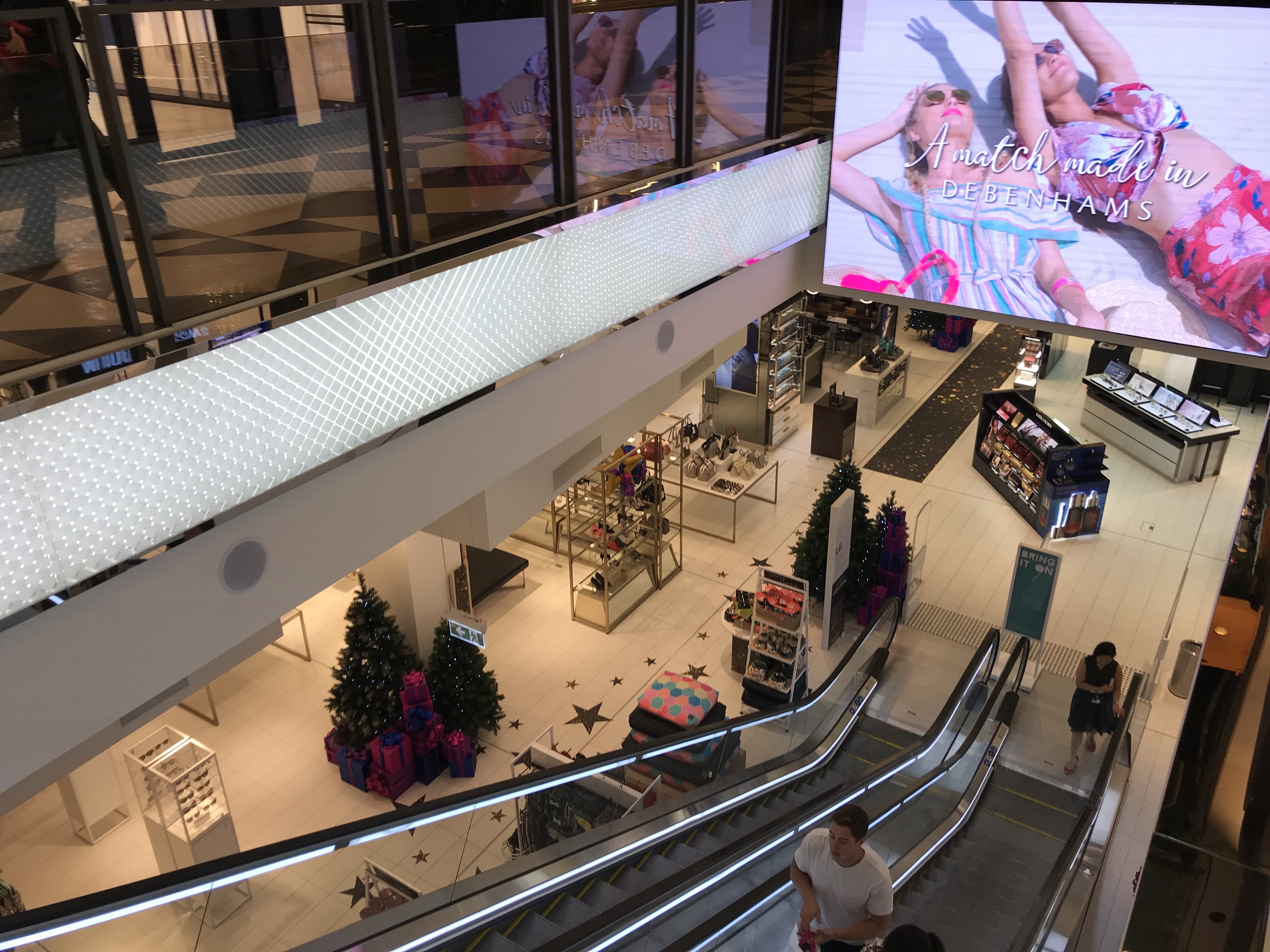
Lower Ground Shops

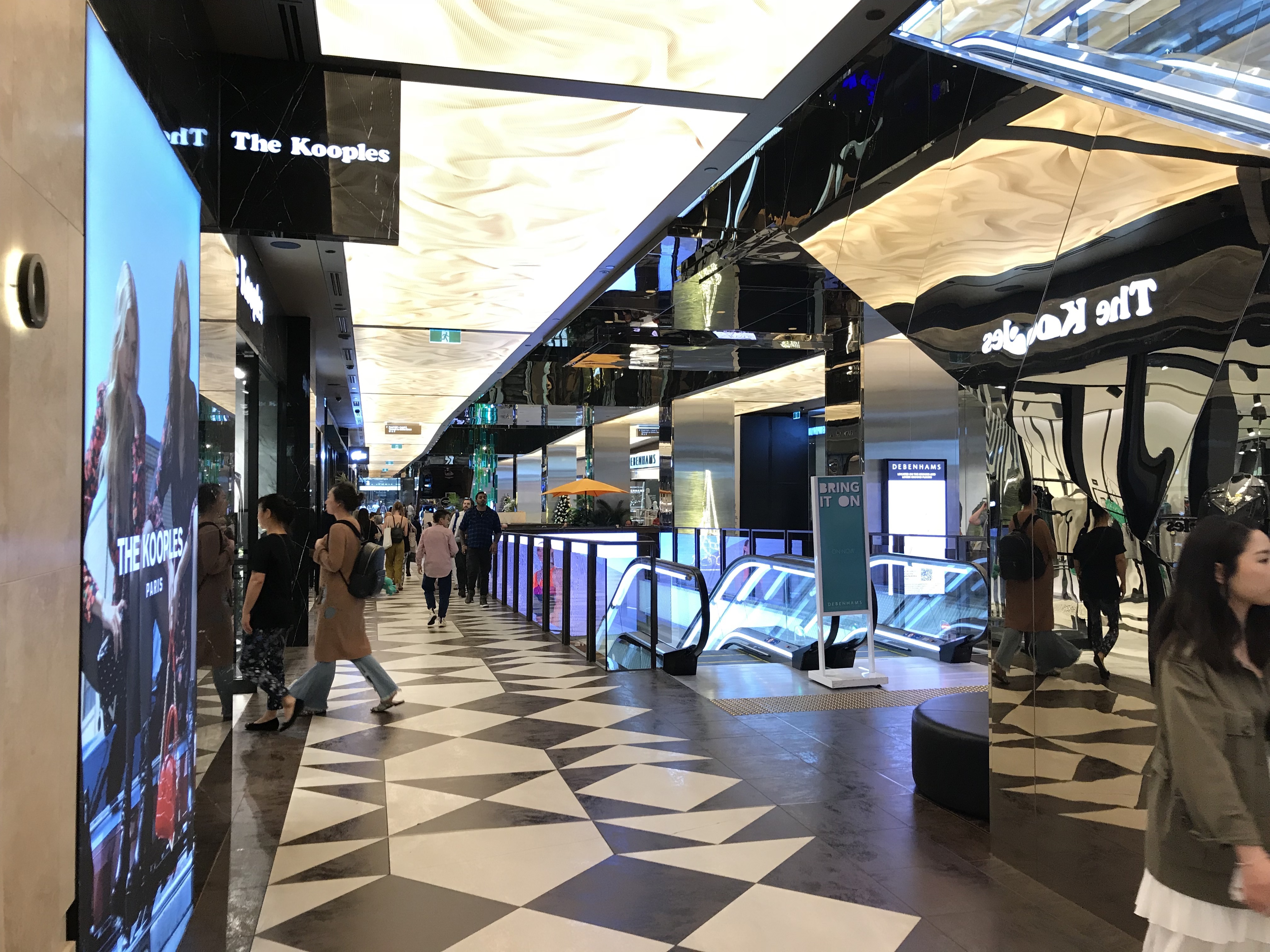
Ground Floor Shops

Collins Arcade (formerly St. Collins Lane) is a shopping centre completed in 2016, designed by ARM Architecture, located between Collins and Little Collins streets in Melbourne, Australia. The centre is located beneath the Novotel Melbourne on Collins hotel which occupies the upper nine floors.

It leads directly into the Walk Arcade at the northern end, and faces Centreway Arcade across Collins Street at the southern end, forming part of a chain of arcades and lanes which lead from Flinders Street station to Melbourne Central Shopping Centre through the mid section of all the blocks between Elizabeth and Swanston streets.

== History ==
Starting in the late 1870s, this block of Collins Street was home to the city's most fashionable stores, such as milliners, glove-importers, portrait painters, photographers and hairdressers. Businesses such as George's Emporium, Allan's and Glen's music and Mullens' Bookshop and Lending Library drew the cream of Melbourne society. The act of promenading here became a social pastime, known as ‘doing the block’, and the street became known simply as "The Block", a title taken up by the Block Arcade, built 1890–93. Gunstler's Cafe (at about 280 Collins Street) was established in 1879 and was amongst the most fashionable restaurants in the city. In 1890 it was renamed the Vienna Café, which in 1908 was purchased by Greek Australian restaurateur Antony J. Lucas. During World War I the name of the cafe became controversial, and Lucas responded by expanding and completely rebuilding the interior in 1916, and it reopened as the Cafe Australia, the finest tea-room in the city. Designed by US trained architect Walter Burley Griffin and Marion Mahony Griffin, it was their first completed major work in their adopted country, and featured fountains, sculpture, planting, indirect lighting, and their distinctive intricate geometric detailing. In the late 1930s, the Cafe was demolished and replaced by the Hotel Australia, completed in mid 1939. Designed by Leslie M. Perrott, it was a 12-storey building with 94 rooms, numerous private dining and function rooms, and was the most prestigious hotel in Melbourne in its day. It included an arched-roofed ballroom which was a simplified version of the main Cafe Australia space. The hotel included two small cinemas, a restaurant and bar in the basement, and a through-block shopping arcade on the ground floor which was touted as the largest in Australia, known as the Australia Arcade.

In 1989, the Hotel Australia was demolished to make way for a new development, completed in 1992, the Australia on Collins shopping arcade and four star hotel. The building's architecture, designed by Buchan Laid & Bawden (Now Buchan) was variously described as postmodern and imitating art deco style, and the shopping levels were ramped up and down from the street entrances in order to maximise the number of shops, and which resulted in a confusing layout. In later years, Australia on Collins was criticised as "a poor man's temple to the great god of commercialism" and included in a list of Melbourne's worst buildings by The Age newspaper. The shopping centre in this period included approximately 100 shops and a food court with space for 750 diners.

In April 2014, owner LaSalle Investment Management (LIM) announced that the "dysfunctional" centre would be closed for a redevelopment costing$30 million. Architects Ashton Raggat McDougall were engaged to improve the building's "sight lines" and to prevent customers from feeling "trapped", which resulted in the shopping levels being reduced from five levels to four, without the ramping. LIM stated that the redeveloped centre would be made up of larger stores with a focus on international brands.

The redeveloped St. Collins Lane opened on 16 May 2016 and was immediately placed on the market by its owners, along with the Melbourne Novotel hotel. The centre had an approximately 70% tenancy rate at opening and was hoped by its owners to rival the recently opened Emporium Melbourne on Lonsdale Street.

St. Collins Lane was purchased in November 2016 by JPMorgan Asset Management for a reported price of $247 million. In March 2020, JPMorgan was trying to offload the struggling mall for $150 million

In December 2020, JP Morgan sold St Collins Lane to Credit Suisse for about $122 million. Following UBS’ global bailout of Credit Suisse in March 2023, control of the fund that held the mall transferred to UBS Asset Management, with Kaipara Property Group subsequently installed as the asset and development manager.

As of February 2025, 260 Collins was under renovation, with construction finishing latea 2025

== Tenants ==
The mall has struggled to find tenants. In 2017 it had 45% vacancy.

As of 2018 the centre had 35 operating stores that included clothing, footwear and cosmetics outlets, as well as a food court. Tenants include Swatch, Coach, Furla, The Kooples, Tag Heuer, Birkenstock, Bremont and Leica.

UK department store Debenhams had an outlet in the shopping centre from October 2017 until January 2020.
