= 1928–29 Divisione Nazionale =

28th season of top-tier Italian football

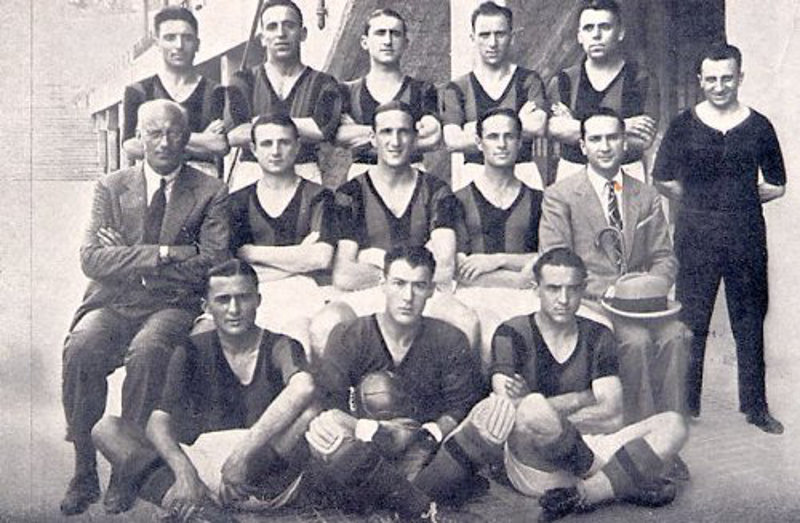
- 1928–29 Bologna team
- Season: 1928–29
- Champions: Bologna; 2nd title
- Relegated: Casale; La Dominante; Novara; Bari; Atalanta; Prato; Legnano; Biellese; Venezia; Pistoiese; Hellas Verona; Fiumana; Reggiana; Fiorentina
- Matches: 484
- Goals: 1,794 (3.71 per match)
- Top goalscorer: Gino Rossetti (36 goals)

The 1928-29 Divisione Nazionale was the twenty-ninth edition of the Italian Football Championship. It was also the sixth season from which the Italian Football Champions adorned their team jerseys in the subsequent season with a Scudetto. This was the third of three seasons of the Italian Football Championship re-branded to Divisione Nazionale (prior to the fourth re-brand that in 1929 created Serie A and Serie B). The 1928–29 Divisione Nazionale was the second Italian Football Championship won by Bologna.

== Format changes ==
Divisione Nazionale was organised into two non-geographical round robin contests. In 1928-29 it was contested by 27 clubs from what was then within Northern Italy, plus three Central and two Southern Italian clubs. The top team from each of the two round robins then decided the championship via a two-legged final.

In 1928 the fascist regime allowed for 1929 the start of the Serie A they stopped in 1926, not before to readmit SS Lazio and SC Napoli to allow a wider representation of Southern Italy, and AS Livorno and La Dominante to avoid odd groups.

More, during the summer the FIGC decided another expansion of the championship to allow a wider representation of the territories annexed after WWI, to save the remaining two clubs of the closing season, and to include AC Fiorentina and three other minor clubs, effectively making the new tournament a mixed Serie A-Serie B championship that should split into the two leagues.

== First phase ==
=== Group A ===
==== Classification ====
Pos	Team	Pld	W	D	L	GF	GA	GD	Pts	Qualification
1	Torino (A)	30	21	6	3	115	31	+84	48	Qualified and admitted to A
2	Milan	30	18	6	6	64	34	+30	42	Admitted to Serie A
3	Roma	30	17	6	7	71	34	+37	40	Admitted to Serie A
3	Alessandria	30	16	8	6	64	47	+17	40	Admitted to Serie A
5	Pro Patria	30	15	6	9	68	52	+16	36	Admitted to Serie A
6	Modena	30	14	7	9	59	51	+8	35	Admitted to Serie A
7	Livorno (G)	30	13	6	11	61	62	−1	32	Admitted to Serie A
8	Padova	30	11	8	11	53	58	−5	30	Admitted to Serie A
9	Triestina (G, T)	30	12	5	13	60	68	−8	29	Later admitted to Serie A (Note: Relegated to Serie B and later readmitted to Serie A.)
10	Casale	30	8	7	15	59	72	−13	23	Admitted to Serie B
10	La Dominante (G)	30	8	7	15	38	68	−30	23	Admitted to Serie B
10	Novara	30	8	7	15	40	77	−37	23	Admitted to Serie B
13	Bari	30	6	10	14	38	61	−23	22	Admitted to Serie B
14	Atalanta	30	6	9	15	27	53	−26	21	Admitted to Serie B
15	Prato (G, T)	30	7	5	18	36	63	−27	19	Later admitted to Serie B (Note: Relegated to Serie C and later readmitted to Serie B, .)
16	Legnano (G, T)	30	7	4	19	33	68	−35	18	Later admitted to Serie B

Source: Panini
(A) Advance to a further round; (G) Guests; (T) Qualified, but not yet for the particular phase indicated

==== Results table ====
Home \ Away	ALE	ATA	BAR	CSL	LDO	LEG	LIV	MIL	MOD	NOV	PAD	PRA	PPA	ROM	TOR	TRI
Alessandria		2–2	6–3	1–1	4–0	2–0	5–1	1–0	3–1	3–0	2–1	2–1	4–1	0–2	3–3	2–0
Atalanta	0–2		0–0	2–0	2–0	2–0	0–3	0–1	0–0	2–0	2–2	2–0	0–0	1–3	0–1	4–1
Bari	4–1	1–1		1–4	3–2	2–0	1–1	2–2	2–3	3–3	4–1	0–3	0–0	2–1	0–2	4–2
Casale	1–4	1–0	0–0		1–1	6–0	7–2	3–3	5–2	6–2	3–0	4–2	3–3	1–5	0–1	1–4
La Dominante	0–1	2–2	1–0	2–2		3–2	2–0	0–2	0–0	4–2	0–3	3–2	3–5	1–2	1–1	2–0
Legnano	1–1	1–1	2–1	5–2	0–1		1–0	1–5	0–3	0–0	1–0	2–0	1–0	1–2	1–2	2–3
Livorno	2–2	3–2	1–1	5–0	8–1	4–1		1–0	2–0	5–3	2–0	2–1	2–2	1–0	1–3	1–1
Milan	2–2	5–1	5–1	3–1	5–2	6–1	2–1		1–1	7–0	1–2	4–0	3–2	0–1	3–1	2–1
Modena	1–1	4–0	2–1	4–0	1–0	3–2	5–1	3–0		1–1	5–1	0–0	1–1	3–1	1–5	4–2
Novara	0–1	5–1	2–0	2–0	0–0	1–1	0–2	1–4	4–2		1–1	2–1	3–2	1–3	1–7	2–1
Padova	3–3	1–0	5–0	3–3	0–0	3–1	4–3	1–2	2–3	2–2		2–1	4–3	4–3	0–0	2–2
Prato	3–1	0–0	2–0	3–0	2–1	1–0	2–3	0–2	2–3	1–2	1–3		2–2	0–0	0–2	2–1
Pro Patria	4–0	2–0	2–1	2–1	2–3	2–1	2–1	0–4	3–1	7–0	3–0	5–1		4–3	1–3	2–1
Roma	2–2	3–0	0–0	2–1	3–1	4–1	0–0	1–1	5–0	4–0	1–2	4–0	3–0		6–1	4–0
Torino	6–1	7–0	0–0	4–0	8–1	7–0	10–1	2–2	3–1	5–0	3–1	9–1	2–3	3–0		12–0
Triestina	2–1	2–0	7–1	4–2	5–1	1–4	4–2	1–0	3–1	1–0	3–0	2–2	1–3	3–3	2–2	

Updated to match(es) played on unknown. Source: Almanacco Illustrato del Calcio - La Storia 1898-2004, Panini Edizioni, Modena, September 2005 (in Italian)
Legend: Blue = home team win; Yellow = draw; Red = away team win.

=== Group B ===
==== Classification ====
Pos	Team	Pld	W	D	L	GF	GA	GD	Pts	Qualification
1	Bologna (A)	30	22	5	3	84	32	+52	49	Qualified and admitted to A
2	Juventus	30	16	9	5	76	25	+51	41	Admitted to Serie A
2	Brescia	30	18	5	7	67	35	+32	41	Admitted to Serie A
4	Genova 1893	30	17	5	8	71	35	+36	39	Admitted to Serie A
5	Pro Vercelli	30	16	6	8	71	40	+31	38	Admitted to Serie A
6	Ambrosiana	30	16	3	11	95	38	+57	35	Admitted to Serie A
7	Cremonese	30	14	5	11	46	43	+3	33	Admitted to Serie A
8	Lazio (G)	30	13	3	14	47	39	+8	29	Both admitted to Serie A (Note: Lazio and Napoli were set to play a qualification match, but both teams were admitted to Serie A after the match went void.)
8	Napoli (G, T)	30	11	7	12	61	64	−3	29	Both admitted to Serie A
10	Biellese	30	11	6	13	34	56	−22	28	Admitted to Serie B
11	Venezia (G)	30	10	5	15	53	65	−12	25	Admitted to Serie B
12	Pistoiese	30	9	7	14	36	65	−29	25	Admitted to Serie B
12	Hellas Verona (G)	30	10	5	15	32	73	−41	25	Admitted to Serie B
14	Fiumana (G)	30	4	8	18	32	73	−41	15 (Note: 1 point deducted.)	Admitted to Serie B
15	Reggiana (G, T)	30	3	7	20	51	103	−52	13	Later admitted to Serie B (Note: Relegated to Serie C and later readmitted to Serie B, .)
16	Fiorentina (G, T)	30	5	2	23	26	96	−70	12	Later admitted to Serie B

Source: Panini
(A) Advance to a further round; (G) Guests; (T) Qualified, but not yet for the particular phase indicated

==== Results table ====
Home \ Away	AMB	BIE	BOL	BRE	CRE	FIO	FIU	GEN	JUV	LAZ	NAP	PST	PVE	REA	VEN	HEL
Ambrosiana		7–0	1–1	5–1	0–1	3–0	8–1	0–1	4–2	3–1	0–1	9–1	3–0	5–1	10–2	9–0
Biellese	2–1		1–1	0–2	2–1	3–1	1–0	2–1	1–3	2–0	3–2	1–0	1–2	3–0	2–1	3–0
Bologna	3–1	3–0		1–0	6–0	3–0	2–0	3–1	0–0	6–2	5–1	5–0	3–0	5–1	3–0	4–1
Brescia	0–0	2–2	10–0		0–0	5–0	3–2	5–0	1–1	4–2	2–0	3–0	0–0	5–1	3–1	2–1
Cremonese	0–2 (Note: Forfeit)	3–1	0–2	2–1		6–0	4–1	3–2	0–0	4–2	5–1	1–0	0–2	3–0	2–1	1–0
Fiorentina	0–3	2–0	2–3	2–3	2–1		3–0	1–2	0–4	0–4	1–1	0–1	0–1	2–0	0–2	1–1
Fiumana	1–2	2–1	0–2 (Note: Decided by the FIGC)	0–2	1–1	4–2		0–0	1–3	0–2	1–1	2–2	2–2	4–0	1–1	2–1
Genova 1893	6–1	5–0	3–0	1–1	2–0	7–0	4–2		3–3	1–0	2–1	2–1	2–0	2–2	1–0	11–0
Juventus	0–0	0–0	1–1	0–1	3–0	11–0	11–0	2–0		0–1	3–1	4–0	1–3	2–0	4–0	4–0
Lazio	1–0	2–0	0–1	0–1	3–0	5–1	2–0	0–2	1–2		0–0	4–0	1–1	4–0	1–0	3–0
Napoli	4–1	5–0	0–4	4–0	1–1	7–2	2–1	1–2	1–0	1–2		4–1	3–3	6–2	4–1	3–0
Pistoiese	1–0	1–1	0–0	2–3	2–0	2–0	1–1	1–0	0–4	2–1	0–1		2–1	8–2	3–1	1–1
Pro Vercelli	4–1	5–1	2–0	3–0	2–1	5–0	4–1	1–1	3–4	3–1	4–1	9–0		4–0	3–0	1–1
Reggiana	1–4	2–2	3–9	1–4	3–4	2–3	1–1	2–1	2–2	1–1	8–2	2–2	3–1		4–5	3–4
Venezia	1–4	3–1	1–2	3–2	1–1	3–1	3–1	3–1	1–1	2–0	2–2	1–1	5–2	2–3		5–0
Hellas Verona	1–0	0–0	1–6	3–2	0–1	4–0	2–0	0–5	0–1	2–1	0–0	2–1	2–1	3–1	2–1	

Updated to match(es) played on unknown. Source: Almanacco Illustrato del Calcio - La Storia 1898-2004, Panini Edizioni, Modena, September 2005 (in Italian)
Legend: Blue = home team win; Yellow = draw; Red = away team win.

== Serie A qualifications ==
Team 1	Score	Team 2
Lazio	2–2	Napoli

Both clubs were admitted to the Serie A to allow a wider representation of Southern Italy.

== Mitropa qualifications ==
Italy was invited to join the 1929 Mitropa Cup when the championship was not yet finished, so the FIGC decided a playoff between the apparent runners-up Juventus and Milan, and two out of the three remaining football giants Inter and Genoa.

== National Finals ==
Team 1	Agg.	Team 2	1st leg	2nd leg
Bologna	● 2 points each ●	Torino	3-1	0-1

Because of the sole points were considered by the championship regulations, with no relevance to the aggregation of goals, a tie-break was needed.

Tie-break in Rome

Team 1	Score	Team 2
Bologna	1-0	Torino

== Top goalscorers ==
Rank	Player	Club	Goals
1	(Italy) Gino Rossetti	Torino	36
2	(Italy) Giuseppe Meazza	Ambrosiana	33
3	(Italy) Angelo Schiavio	Bologna	30

== References and sources ==
- Almanacco Illustrato del Calcio - La Storia 1898-2004, Panini Edizioni, Modena, September 2005
