= Majestic Theatre, Launceston =

Historic theatre in Launceston, Tasmania

Majestic Theatre
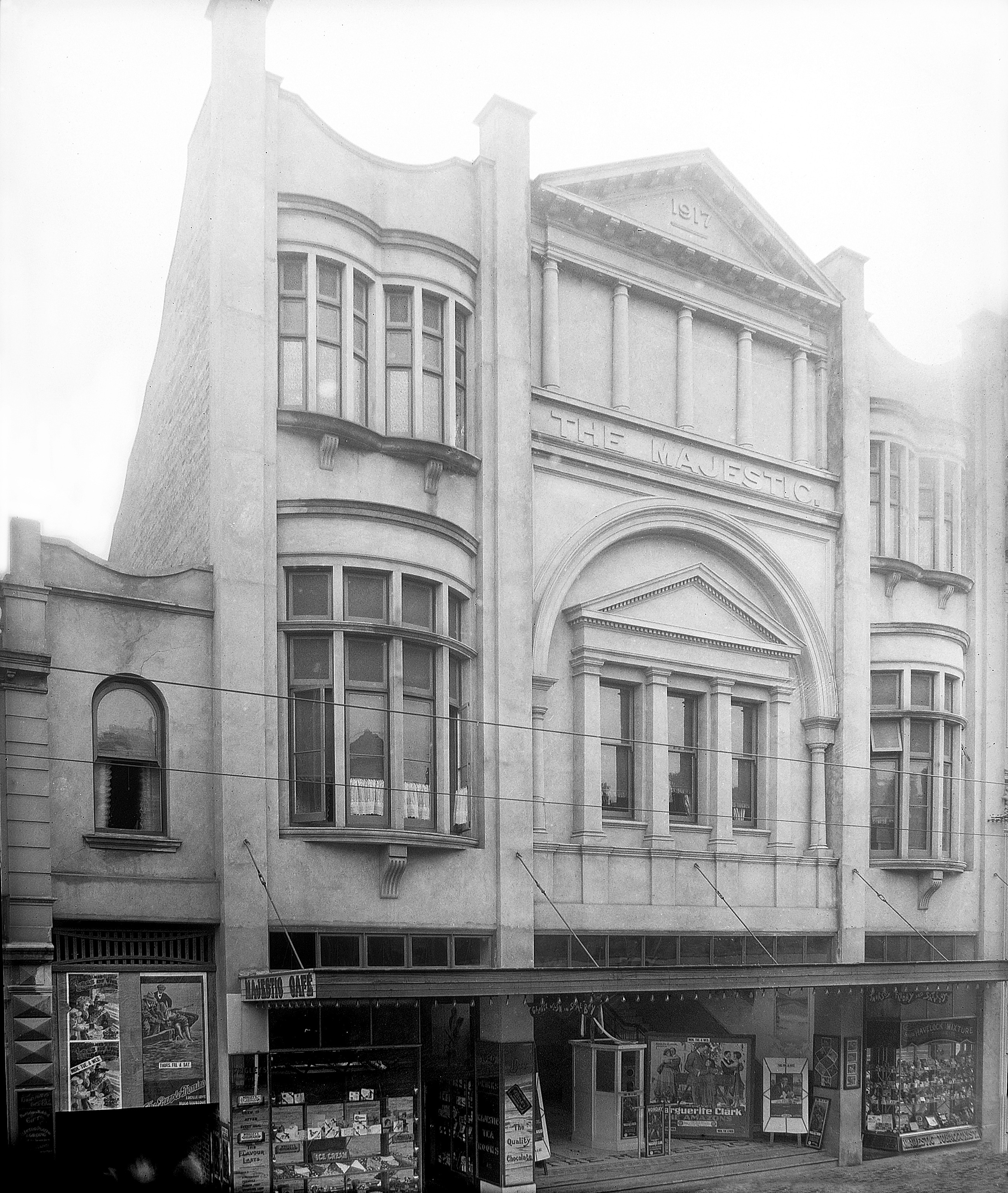
- The Majestic Theatre in 1917
- Interactive map of Majestic Theatre
- Address: 76 Brisbane Street; Launceston, Tasmania; Australia
- Coordinates: 41°26′11.5″S 147°8′22.85″E
- Owner: Neil Pitts Mensware
- Capacity: 1,510

Construction
- Opened: 2 June 1917; 109 years ago
- Closed: 28 February 1970; 56 years ago
- Years active: 1917–1970
- Architect: Marino Lucas (design)

Website
- Official site

Tasmanian Heritage Register
- Place ID: 3,891
- Status: Permanently Registered

The Majestic Theatre is a historic former theatre and cinema in Launceston, Tasmania, Australia.

== History ==
The Majestic Theatre was constructed for approximately £A18,000 by Greek–Australian businessman Marino Lucas, opening to a full-house on 2 June 1917. Hundreds of attendees remained outside the building, unable to secure a seat. The theatre could seat 1,510 patrons (450 in the dress circle, 700 in the stalls, and 360 in the back stalls) with a proscenium measuring 9.1 by 7.6 metres (30 ft × 25 ft)

It was Marino Lucas' second theatre in Launceston, following the success of the Princess Theatre. Designed under the supervision of Lucas, the Majestic was architecturally influenced by Lucas' Ithacecian roots. "The architecture is Grecian," commented the Launceston Daily Telegraph, "and at the top one can see glimpses of the ancient Pantheon style."

Centrally located within the Launceston tramway network on a main street, during World War I the Majestic became the busiest and most profitable cinema in Tasmania. Anthony Lucas, the brother of Lucas, may have been influenced by the Majestic's phenomenal success when he planned to construct a centrally positioned theatre in Melbourne. The iconic Capitol Theatre on Swanston Street was designed by Walter Burley and Marion Mahony Griffin under the direction of Lucas in 1924.

The Majestic hosted the world premiere of Ken Hall's Gone to the Dogs in 1939.

Actor Michael Pate visited the Majestic in 1950 to promote the film Sons of Matthew.

Due to the rise in television ownership, the Majestic closed on 26 February 1970. The final film projected was Sweet Charity. It was purchased by brothers Neil and Don Pitt, who converted the building into a menswear store, transforming the mezzanine into a café and utilising the dress circle foyer as a workroom and auditorium as a storeroom.

== Contemporary use ==
The Majestic Theatre has operated as Neil Pitt's Menswear since 1970. The theatre's 1929 projection equipment is on display in the store.

== In popular culture ==
Zane Pinner's horror novel Encore, surrounding fictitious hauntings at the Majestic in Launceston was published in 2022.

== See also ==
- List of theatres in Hobart
