= Yeshivah Gedolah Zal =

Chabad school

Yeshivah Gedolah "Zal" (Hebrew: ישיבה גדולה זאל), Yeshivah Gedolah, The Rabbinical College of Australia and New Zealand, or colloquially, Y.G., is a government accredited yeshiva, an academy for young Orthodox Jews to devote themselves to full-time rabbinical studies. It is located in St Kilda East, Victoria, Melbourne, Australia, and is the only yeshiva of its kind on the continent. It is under the auspices of the Chabad-Lubavitch Hasidic movement. It offers the government recognised Diploma of Talmudic Studies.

== Founding and naming ==
Yeshivah Gedolah was founded on 1 February 1966, under the auspices of the Lubavitcher Rebbe, Rabbi Menachem Mendel Schneerson. Both the addition of the word "Zal" (yid. - study hall) and the name "The Rabbinical College of Australia and New Zealand" were at the suggestion of Rabbi Schneerson. Rabbi Schneersohn would (ritually) sell the yeshiva with his private chametz (leavened bread) before Pesach (passover) each year.

== History and leadership ==
Rabbi Zalman Serebryanski and Rabbi Yaakov Eliezer Herzog were the founding administrators. Rabbi Herzog was the Rosh Yeshiva and Rabbi Serebryanski was the Mashpia. Rabbi Chaim Gutnick served as honorary Rosh Yeshiva and would deliver weekly lectures and examine the students from time to time.

In 1974, Rabbi Binyomin Gavriel Cohen became the new Rosh Yeshiva and in 1989 Rabbi Yaakov Winner was appointed Mashpia. Rabbi SholomBer Engel is the Mashgiach (supervisor).

== Location ==
The yeshiva began on Goathlands Avenue, St Kilda East. On 17 December 1970, a campus on Alexandra Street was purchased under Rabbi Schneerson's name by Chabad-Lubavitch in Melbourne. The yeshiva is currently located on Alexandra Street. The building, known as The New Alexandra, is an officially recognized historical site.

== Property history ==
In the early 1920s, Marino Lucas purchased the mansion Fairholme in Alexandra Street, St Kilda East, Victoria. He subsequently subdivided a portion of the north-eastern section of the grounds and built five residential houses in the then popular California Bungalow style. After his death on 28 September 1931 at the height of the Great Depression, the mansion was sold, becoming a reception hall and is today modified for use as The Rabbinical College of Australia & NZ.

== Student shluchim ==
Before Passover of 1967 student Shluchim (emissaries of Rabbi Schneerson) arrived from the U.S. These were unmarried students of advanced caliber sent to bolster the Yeshiva by studying and teaching the local students. After the resignation of Rabbi Herzog, the student Shluchim took over as teachers of Talmud in the Yeshiva. They also studied with Jewish university students, many of whom eventually enrolled in the Yeshiva. They opened up an English lending library of Jewish literature.

According to the current system at any given time there are altogether twelve student Shluchim on a two-year stay, but six student Shluchim leave each year after completing their two-year period, and six new student Shluchim arrive, usually in the month of Cheshvan. This was done in order to prevent a gap in which no student Shluchim are present. Thus, at any given time there are six student Shluchim in their first year and six in their second. It is customary for the entire Yeshiva to travel to the airport to greet the newly arrived student Shluchim.

== See also ==
- Oholei Torah
- Rabbinical College of America
- Yeshiva Gedolah in Sydney
