= Marino Nicolich =

Italian footballer

Personal information
- Date of birth: 30 July 1910
- Place of birth: Monfalcone, Italy
- Height: 1.75 m (5 ft 9 in)
- Position: Full back

Senior career*
| Years | Team | Apps | (Gls) |
| 1928–1930 | Monfalcone (Note: The figure only includes appearances in the 1929–30 Serie B season; it omits any prior appearances, e.g. those in the 1928–29 Prima Divisione.) | 33 | (0) |
| 1930–1931 | Spezia | 9 | (0) |
| 1931–1932 | Roma | 3 | (0) |
| 1932–1933 | Monfalcone | 5 | (0) |
| 1933–1937 | Triestina | 46 | (0) |
| 1937–1938 | Venezia | 4 | (0) |
| 1938–1940 | Monfalcone | | |
- * Club domestic league appearances and goals

Marino Nicolich (30 July 1910 – after 1939), also known as Marino Nicoli, (Note: Nicolich's surname was changed to Nicoli under the fascist regime's policy of Italianisation of personal names of Germanic or Slavic origin.) was an Italian professional footballer who played as a full back. He made 100 appearances in the top two tiers of Italian football in the late 1920s and 1930s.

== Career ==
Nicolich was born in Monfalcone, and began his football career with his hometown club. He was a member of the team that won their group of the 1928–29 Prima Divisione, thus gaining promotion to the inaugural season of Serie B. In April 1929, the 18-year-old Nicolich was selected for the representative team of his region, Venezia Giulia, to face their Tuscan counterparts. Il Littoriale reported that the Venezia Giulia team did not live up to expectations, and its strength lay in its defence, which partnered "the cunning and Olympian calm of Lorenzo Gazzari with the exuberant impetuosity of the youthful Nicolich"; the match ended 2–2. He played in all but one of Monfalcone's matches in the 1929–30 Serie B season, before playing nine games for Spezia at the end of the following campaign while stationed in the area on military service.

Having failed to persuade Bologna and Italy defender Eraldo Monzeglio to join the club, 1930–31 Serie A runners-up Roma chose to pursue Nicolich instead, albeit as one for the future, not yet ready for a team with high aspirations. He signed in August 1931, but because of formalities connected with his military service, he was unable to join up with the squad for several weeks. When he did, he produced a performance in a training match that, according to Il Littoriale, showed he could provide stiff competition for the established full backs, Mario De Micheli and Renato Bodini. While physically similar to Gazzari, and now possessed of a similar calmness, Nicolich was less speedy in clearing the ball but compensated by placing it more precisely, to be more useful to the recipient, and he had the better of individual duels with Serie A top scorer Rodolfo Volk. Nicolich made his first-team and Serie A debut on 28 October 1931, replacing De Micheli for the visit to Pro Patria. He made several errors, which unsettled the midfield, and Roma twice had to come from behind to draw 2–2. He appeared twice more for the first team, but did not do himself justice, and was transfer-listed at the end of the season.

Nicolich returned to Monfalcone, and played in five of the first six matches, after which financial issues with the club's ownership forced its withdrawal from the 1932–33 Serie B. He was one of several Monfalcone players to join Serie A club Triestina for the following season. He played little first-team football in his first season at Triestina, but was a regular in 1934–35. He was his side's man of the match against Livorno in October, and when Roma played Triestina in December, Eugenio Danese wrote that Nicolich, "who appeared clearly better than the Nicolich we saw playing in a Roma shirt, fulfilled his task commendably". He was with Triestina for a further two seasons, but not as a regular, and then spent a season with Venezia of Serie B, where again he played little, before returning to Monfalcone in 1938.
