= Antony J. Lucas =

Greek–Australian businessman (1869?–1931)

- Born: 18 October 1862; Ithaca, United States of the Ionian Islands
- Died: 10 August 1946 (aged 83); Melbourne, Victoria, Australia
- Known for: Businessman
- Relatives: Marinos Lekatsas (brother)

Antony John Jereos Lekatsas (1862–1946), best remembered as Anthony J. J. Lucas, was an influential Australian businessman noted for his philanthropic activities and as proprietor and developer of a number of noted entertainment and restaurant ventures in Melbourne, Australia in the early 20th century. Lucas became the Greek Consul General to Australia in 1921, then Consul in Melbourne in 1931–46.

== Early years ==
Born Antonios Ioannis Gerasimos Lekatsas on 18 October 1862, he was the second child of Ioannis Lekatsas (a priest) and his wife Magdalene Palmos. Migrating just before his younger brother Marino Lucas (Marinos Lekatsas) from their hometown of Exoghi (Exogi) on the Greek island of Ithaca in 1886, the young man quickly began to build his fortune.

In 1894 Lucas opened the Town Hall Café in Swanston Street, the main thoroughfare of Melbourne, opposite the Town Hall. Often employing Greek staff and spanning two floors, the café serviced over five hundred diners at any one time.

== Prosperity ==
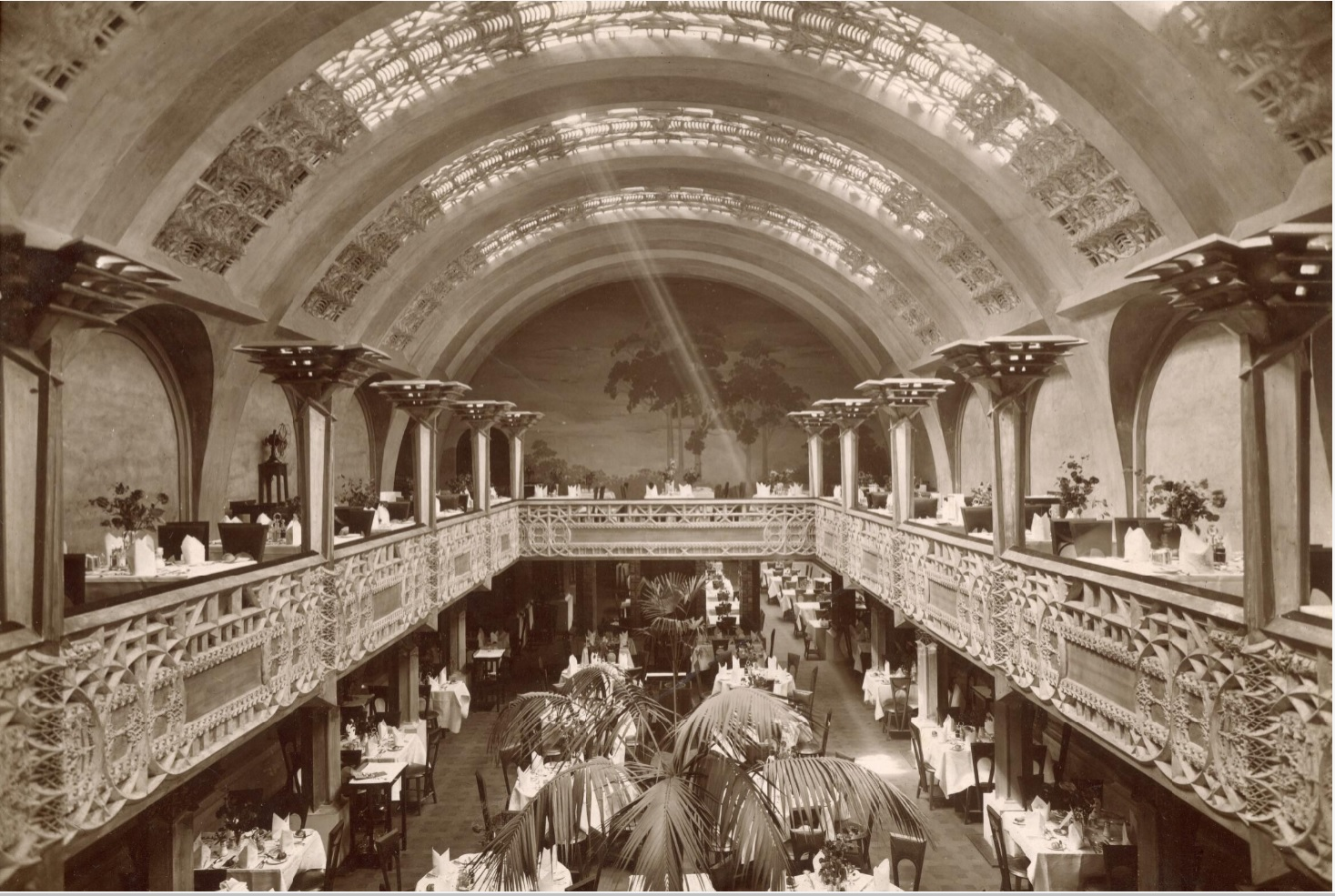
Cafe Australia Banqueting Hall in 1916

Lucas then created a new French-themed venture in Collins Street, the Paris Café, opening in 1904. This was located in the middle of 'The Block', the most fashionable part of the city, the north side of Collins Street between Swanston and Elizabeth Streets. Then in 1908 he purchased a controlling interest in the long established Vienna Café (a few doors down at 260 Collins Street). These ventures prospered under Lucas' keen entrepreneurial skills.

During World War 1, when anti-German sentiment was at a fever pitch, with German street names changed and German social clubs closed, the name of the cafe drew protests, especially when the Austrian eagle appeared on the wine list in June 1916. According to 2016 Age article even worse had occurred:

"In 1915, a group of drunken soldiers, incensed that the Vienna Cafe bore the name of the enemy, stoned the premises and threatened its patrons. Lekatsas closed the cafe and hired Chicago architect, Walter Burley Griffin and his wife, Marion Mahony Griffin, to remodel it. Griffin was in Australia to oversee the building of Canberra. The contract also allowed him to set up private practices in Melbourne and Sydney."

Having purchased the adjoining building in 1915, Lekatsas quickly implemented his plans to rebuild and expand his cafe, and responded to the prevailing mood by naming the venture the Cafe Australia. The cafe was re-opened in only five months in November 1916 at a gala event attended by prominent Melburnians, including opera singer, Nellie Melba. The guests were stunned by the arched quartz entrance, the piers with reliefs of Greek goddesses by Margaret Baskerville, the marble stairway to the grand banquet hall, the murals of Australian pastoral scenes by Bertha Merfield, and the avant-garde design of the furniture, among many other striking features. The renovations arguably marked the beginnings of modernist architecture in Australia. The cafe was replaced by the Hotel Australia in 1939, itself demolished in 1989.

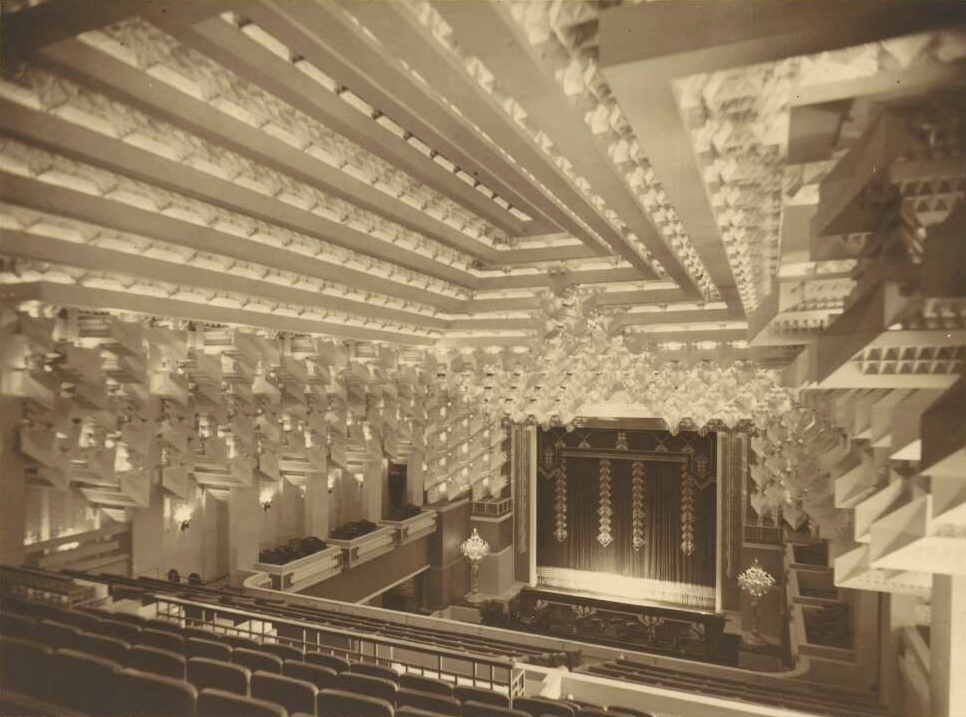
The Capitol Theatre auditorium in 1924

In 1919, brother Marino Lucas' Majestic Theatre became the busiest and most profitable cinema in Tasmania. This and the rising global interest in silent films may have influenced Lekatsas, now known as Anthony Lucas, to join forces with the American Phillips brothers (who had been behind the development of Luna Park in seaside St Kilda), to demolish the Town Hall Cafe and build Melbourne's first large scale elaborate picture palace, known as the Capitol Theater. He again employed the Griffins to design both the theatre and the ten storey office building placed above, and when the theatre opened on 7 November 1924, the unique crystalline interior and coloured lighting was considered a marvel. The Capitol has subsequently achieved heritage status as one of the most avant-garde theatres in the world, and is now registered with the Australian Heritage Commission, the National Trust and Heritage Victoria.

With reference to the journal The 200 years History of Australian Cooking, Tess Malos claims that Lucas also ran an open-air restaurant in the public gardens of the inner Melbourne suburb of Kew.

The 1916 'Life in Australia' publication by John Comino had a significant section devoted to AJ Lucas, some of which follows:

"24 years have flowed (since his arrival in Australia) and, properly used by a great, capable and audacious man, such as Mr. Antonios Lekatsas is, have resulted in the acquisition of substantial wealth. Three splendid, smart and exquisite buildings, of a commercial nature and part of the property owned by him, together with another building of twelve storeys, the tallest in Australia, standing by Sydney Central Railway Station and bearing the name "Australian Buildings", sing the praises of the splendid abilities of Mr. Antonios Lekatsas, who is the richest of the Greeks settled in the State of Victoria."

Initially residing on the top floor of the Town Hall Café, Lucas was wealthy enough by 1918 to purchase the 1870s Toorak mansion Whernside. This property was subsequently owned by Jewish immigrant and business tycoon Solomon Lew, and still exists. In 1928 Lucas moved to the large property Yamala on the Mornington Peninsula, where he again employed the Griffins to redesign the house and gardens.

== Religious and Ithacan Interests ==
Lucas helped found and was frequently the head of the Greek Orthodox Church in Melbourne and was also the President of the Ulysses Philanthropic Society of Melbourne ('Antonis Lekatsas' was the first president of the Ithacan Philanthropic Society) from 1916 until 1923.

He was also opposed to the thinking of Archbishop Knitis and Consul-General Chrysanthopoulos in the Greek Church dispute of the 1920s. During the 1920s, genocidal massacres following the dissolution of the Ottoman Empire saw millions of people displaced from what is now Turkey. Thousands of Orthodox fled to Australia during this period. In July 1924, the Greek Orthodox Metropolitan Christoforos Archbishop Knitis of Australia and New Zealand arrived but by 1929 he had been deposed and was exiled to Samos.

Lucas' opposition to Knitis created a degree of conflict with Andreas Papadopoulos, author of the International Directory: O Diethnis Emporikos Odigos, a huge publication of over 600 pages published in 1927 by International Publishers of Adelaide. The compilation of this journal was primarily instigated and financed by Georgios Nikolaidis, who was also the founder of a short-lived Greek newspaper Okeanis in Adelaide and by G. Hetrelezis. Papadopolous had married Angeliki Papadopoulou, also from Ithaca and a niece and god-daughter of Antony Lucas.

== War Effort ==
At the height of World War II, Lucas organised a programme whereby Melbourne's Greeks donated a day's pay to the Greek war effort. On 1 May 1941 an Italian annexation of Ithaca had begun and by late September 1943, the subsequent German occupation commenced, although this lasted just over one year.

Lucas was also an avid supporter of the Lord Mayor's Hospital Appeal.

He personally donated £10,000 to a fund which he organised for Greek and British child war-victims and in 1939 was awarded the Golden Cross of Taxiarchon, an order initiated by Greece's King George I. In October 1944 a special service to commemorate his birthday and the coincident liberation of Athens was conducted in the Greek Orthodox Church in Victoria Parade.

== Later life ==
In later life he was director of several companies and was said to be the richest Greek-Australian in the country. He died in Sydney on 10 August 1946, leaving an estate valued for probate at nearly £134,000. He was buried with Greek Orthodox rites in Melbourne general cemetery; his six daughters survived him.
