= Miguel A. Marino =

American engineer

Miguel A. Marino is an American engineer, currently the Distinguished Professor Emeritus of Hydrologic Sciences, Civil and Environmental Engineering and Biological & Agricultural Engineering at University of California, Davis, and also a published author. He was honored as a Distinguished Member of the American Society of Civil Engineers (ASCE) in 1999, and a Life Member in 2005, as well as being the ASCE's Editor of its journal Journal of Water Resources Planning and Management in 1984–88.

== Education ==
- A.A., Liberal Arts (1959), Andrew College, Cuthbert, GA
- B.S., Petroleum Engineering (1962), New Mexico Institute of Mining & Technology, Socorro
- M.S. Groundwater Hydrology (1965), New Mexico Institute of Mining & Technology, Socorro
- Ph.D., Engineering (1972) University of California, Los Angeles
