= 1929–30 Serie B =

Italian football league season

Serie B
- Season: 1929–30
- Champions: Casale; 1st title

Serie B 1929-30 team distribution

The 1929–30 Serie B was the first tournament of this round robin competition played in Italy after its creation.

== Teams ==
The 18 clubs were the last 7 of each group of 1928–29 Divisione Nazionale, the first 3 teams of the 1928–29 Prima Divisione, and the winner of the special 1928–29 Southern Championship.

== League table ==
Pos	Team	Pld	W	D	L	GF	GA	GD	Pts	Promotion or relegation
1	Casale (P, C)	34	22	5	7	84	39	+45	49	Promotion to Serie A
2	Legnano (P)	34	19	8	7	56	31	+25	46	Promotion to Serie A
3	La Dominante (Note: La Dominante renamed A.C. Liguria at the end of the season.)	34	18	6	10	53	53	0	42	
4	Fiorentina	34	16	8	10	64	39	+25	40	
5	Pistoiese	34	17	6	11	46	36	+10	40	
6	Hellas Verona	34	17	5	12	48	47	+1	39	
7	Venezia	34	17	4	13	60	58	+2	38	
8	Atalanta	34	11	15	8	37	26	+11	37	
9	Bari	34	16	4	14	72	40	+32	36	
10	Novara	34	15	6	13	63	41	+22	36	
11	Monfalconese	34	16	3	15	57	44	+13	35	
12	Parma	34	12	8	14	38	57	−19	32	
13	Lecce	34	11	8	15	39	44	−5	30	
14	Spezia	34	12	6	16	36	54	−18	30	
15	Biellese (R)	34	11	3	20	34	58	−24	25	Relegation to Prima Divisione
16	Reggiana (R)	34	8	7	19	45	75	−30	23	Relegation to Prima Divisione
17	Prato (R)	34	5	7	22	27	71	−44	17	Relegation to Prima Divisione
18	Fiumana (Note: Fiumana had one point deducted.) (R)	34	6	5	23	26	72	−46	16	Relegation to Prima Divisione

Source: lega-calcio.it (in Italian)
Rules for classification: 1) points; 2) goal average.
(C) Champions; (P) Promoted; (R) Relegated

== Results ==
Home \ Away	ATA	BAR	BIE	CSL	FIO	FIU	LDO (Note: La Dominante renamed A.C. Liguria at the end of the season.)	LCE	LEG	MFA	NOV	PAR	PST	PRA	REA	SPE	VEN	HEL
Atalanta		2–0	3–0	1–1	0–1	5–0	2–1	3–1	0–1	1–0	0–0	4–0	2–1	1–1	1–0	1–1	0–1	0–0
Bari	0–0		4–0	1–0	2–1	4–2	6–0	3–0	4–1	2–0	1–1	6–0	7–1	7–0	3–0	3–0	5–1	3–0
Biellese	0–1	1–0		0–3	1–1	2–0	0–2	3–1	3–1	1–0	0–0	3–0	0–1	6–0	2–0	3–2	2–1	3–2
Casale	0–0	2–1	6–0		3–0	2–0	4–0	2–1	4–1	2–1	5–3	2–2	2–1	6–1	8–2	3–0	6–2	6–0
Fiorentina	3–0	3–0	3–0	0–0		4–1	6–1	1–1	1–1	2–1	3–0	1–2	2–1	0–0	1–1	4–1	6–1	4–0
Fiumana	0–2	0–0	2–0	1–1	0–3		0–2	0–0	0–1	0–1	3–0	2–0	0–1	3–0	0–2	1–0	2–0 (Note: Forfeit)	1–2
La Dominante (Note: La Dominante renamed A.C. Liguria at the end of the season.)	1–0	2–1	2–1	4–0	3–1	2–1		2–1	1–0	1–0	1–0	2–2	0–0	3–1	2–1	5–0	1–1	1–0
Lecce	1–1	1–0	2–1	2–0	2–0	4–1	0–0		0–0	2–0	3–0	1–2	3–0	2–1	0–0	0–2	1–2	0–1
Legnano	1–1	1–1	2–0	0–1	2–1	5–1	4–1	3–1		4–1	2–0	3–0	1–0	1–0	2–0	3–0	3–1	2–1
Monfalcone	2–0	2–1	2–0	3–1	1–4	3–0	1–2	3–1	2–2		4–0	0–4	2–0	3–0	3–0	2–0	1–0	4–0
Novara	0–0	5–0	1–0	1–0	3–2	6–0	3–1	1–2	4–0	2–2		4–1	1–0	2–1	9–1	4–0	4–0	4–0
Parma	2–1	1–0	1–0	1–2	1–1	1–1	3–2	1–0	0–3	0–5	1–0		0–0	3–0	1–0	2–0	0–1	2–2
Pistoiese	3–1	1–0	1–0	0–1	1–0	6–1	2–1	1–0	0–0	3–3	1–0	3–0		2–1	4–0	3–0	3–1	1–0
Prato	0–0	1–3	0–0	2–3	1–2	1–1	1–2	2–2	0–2	1–0	1–0	2–1	0–1		2–1	2–0	1–2	2–2
Reggiana	1–1	3–1	1–0	2–5	1–2	7–2	1–1	2–2	0–3	1–3	2–2	2–2	4–2	2–0		1–2	4–1	2–1
Spezia	0–0	2–1	5–1	2–0	0–0	1–0	3–3	3–0	0–0	3–1	1–2	2–0	1–1	1–0	3–0		1–0	0–1
Venezia	1–1	4–1	3–1	1–3	6–1	1–0	3–1	3–1	0–0	2–1	2–1	1–1	1–0	5–1	2–1	5–0		4–1
Hellas Verona	2–2	2–1	4–0	3–0	1–0	3–0	4–0	0–1	2–1	2–0	1–0	1–0	1–1	2–1	2–0	2–0	3–1	

Source: Almanacco Illustrato del Calcio - La Storia 1898-2004, Panini Edizioni, Modena, September 2005 (in Italian)
Legend: Blue = home team win; Yellow = draw; Red = away team win.
