= Janice Nicolich =

Victim of drunk driver

Janice Winblad Nicolich
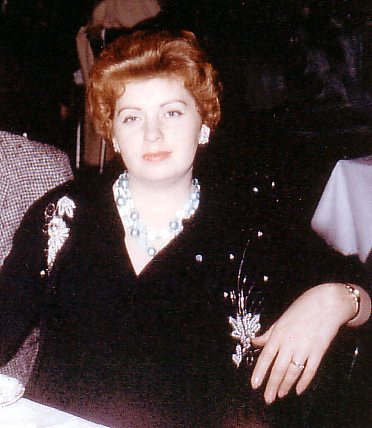
- Nicolich on May 27, 1961
- Born: Janice Ann Winblad; August 9, 1935; Astoria, New York, U.S.
- Died: June 28, 1996 (aged 60); Sidney, Nebraska, U.S.
- Occupation: Housewife
- Spouse: Joseph Anthony Nicolich
- Parent(s): Anthony LeRoy Winblad (1912–1970); Maria W. Zorovich (1912–1993)

Janice Winblad Nicolich (August 9, 1935 – June 28, 1996) was an American woman who was killed in a car accident by a drunk driver. During the trial Nicolich's daughter wrote that she had forgiven the drunk driver and urged that the court do likewise. The subsequent court case led to a Nebraska Supreme Court decision on the issue of leniency in drunk driving deaths. The story was part of an The Oprah Winfrey Show and the book The Road To Forgiveness: Hearts Shattered by Tragedy, Transformed by Love.

== Birth and marriage ==
Janice Ann Winblad was born on August 9, 1935, in Astoria, New York, to Anthony LeRoy Winblad (1912–1970) and Maria W. Zorovich (1912–1993). Janice Winblad married Joseph Anthony Nicolich on May 15, 1954, in Astoria. She was Roman Catholic for most of her adult life and raised her children Catholic. Sometime in the late 1980s or early 1990s she became a member of the Bethlehem Assemblies of God Church in Valley Stream, New York.

== Drive to Salt Lake City ==
Joseph and Janice Nicolich were on their way to their son's wedding in Salt Lake City, Utah, on June 28, 1996. They were on Interstate 80, near Sidney, Nebraska, in their Chrysler Town & Country van. Joe was driving, his wife was in the passenger seat, and their granddaughter, Robyn Griffiths (1985–1996), was in the rear seat. It was raining and Joe saw a car stationary at the side of the road with its flashers on. He was pulling onto the shoulder and slowed down to approximately 25 miles per hour (40 km/h) when he was hit from behind. Robyn Griffiths and Janice Winblad Nicolich were killed.

== Sentence ==
The trial court sentenced Verma Harrison, the drunk driver, to five years' probation on each count. The sentences were to be served consecutively. The conditions of probation subjected Harrison to random drug and alcohol testing, home visitations, and a treatment referral. The light sentence was appealed by Joe Nicolich and was heard by the Nebraska State Court of Appeals, which found the sentence to be excessively lenient. On January 22, 1999, the Nebraska Supreme Court upheld the original sentencing.

== Legacy ==
Nicolich's story was featured on The Oprah Winfrey Show in 1998 and in The Road To Forgiveness: Hearts Shattered by Tragedy, Transformed by Love, published in 2001.
