= Marino Lucas =

Greek–Australian businessman (1869?–1931)

Marinos Lekatsas
- Born: 1869 (?); Ithaca, Greece
- Died: 28 September 1931 (aged 61–62); Melbourne, Victoria, Australia
- Known for: Businessman
- Relatives: Anthony JJ Lucas (brother)

Marinos Lekatsas (1869?–1931), known as Marino Lucas, was a Greek-Australian businessman in the construction industry and the operation of theatres. Originally from Greece, Lucas subsequently lived in Melbourne, Hobart and Launceston, Tasmania, Australia. Lucas and his brother Anthony JJ Lucas were key figures in the early Greek community in Melbourne.

== Early life ==
Marinos Lekatsas was born in the small village of Exoghi, on the Greek island of Ithaca in the Ionian Sea. His father was Ioannis Lekatsas, a clergyman, and his mother was Magdalene (née Palmos).

== Migration ==
Marinos left Ithaca in 1886, shortly after his brother Anthony J. J. Lucas, both of them for Melbourne, Australia. They were inspired by their uncle Andreas Lekatsas, who had visited Ithaca after achieving success in Australia. Anglicising their surname to 'Lucas', the brothers prospered after their arrival in Melbourne, becoming interested in both the building industry and the theatre.

== Career in Australia ==
Melbourne in 1886 was experiencing the influence of the discovery of gold in nearby fields. This had a significant impact on the wealth of the city and resulted in a boom period of residential and industrial construction. Combining their interests in entertainment and building, the Lucas brothers were prominent figures in the construction of theatres in the southern states of Australia. One of Marino's projects in the immediate period after World War I was the Victory Theatre in Wattletree Road, Malvern. The 1,498-seat Victory operated as a dedicated theatre from 1920 to 1956 and was subsequently used as a supermarket and now a fabric store. Its false ceilings conceal the original from 1919.

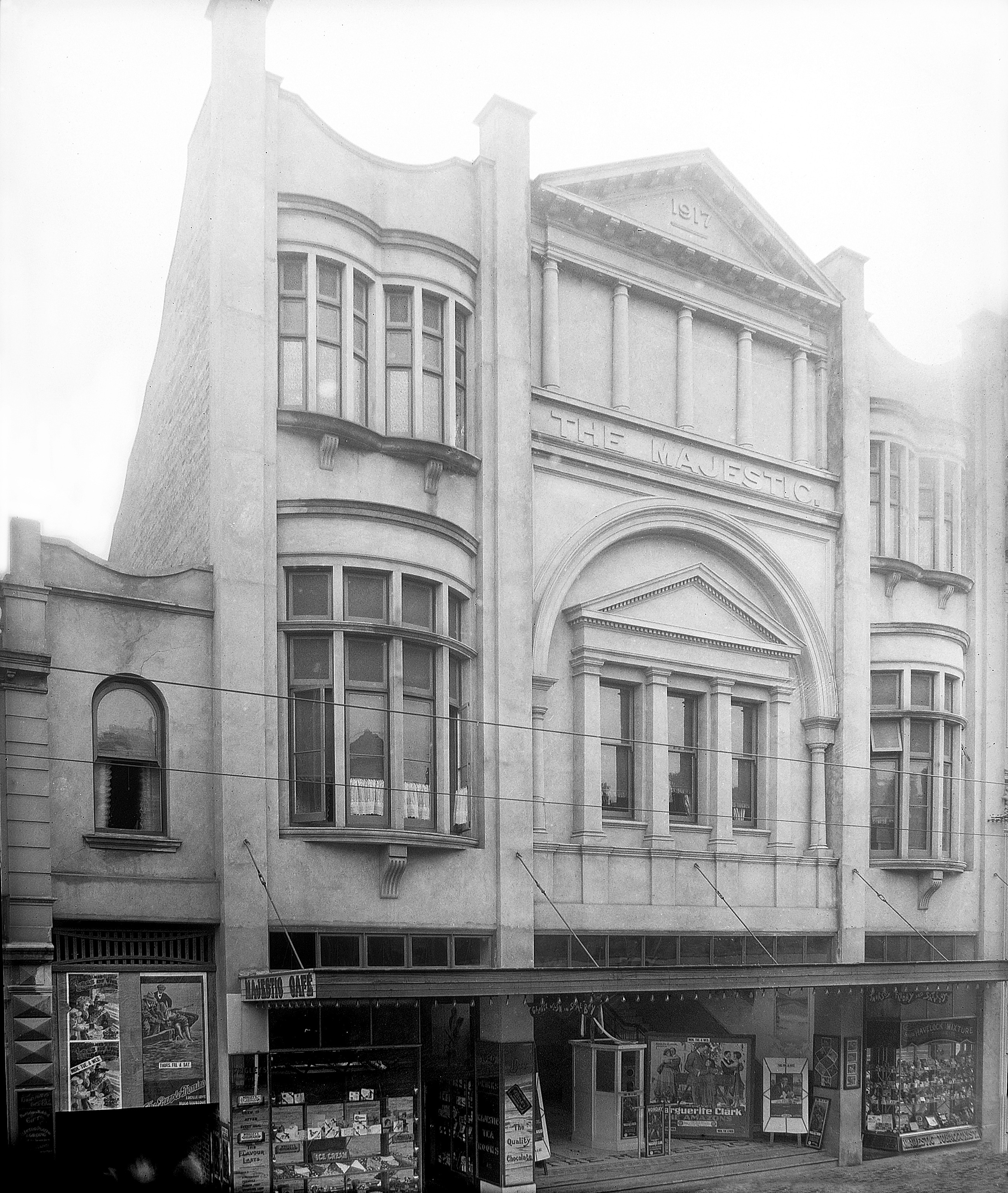
The Majestic Theatre in 1917

=== Tasmanian Theatres ===
In 1907 Marino Lucas arrived in Hobart, Tasmania. His involvement with the entertainment industry continued, and he not only built but also operated theatres, at one stage acting as the manager of the Grand Tivoli Vaudeville Company. He also became involved in cinema and participated in the making of a film.

In 1911, Marino Lucas succeeded in building the Princess Theatre of his own design in Brisbane Street, Launceston, at a cost of between £14,000 and £15,000. All the work except for the stamped metal ceilings was carried out in Launceston, with Messrs J & T Gunn as the contractors for the building, decoration and electric lighting. With a capacity audience of almost 1,770 patrons, the Princess Theatre was described in The Examiner newspaper at the time as "the only theatre in Tasmania with such up-to-date appliances, and which are equal to any in other states."

Lucas returned to Melbourne in 1913, remaining there until 1916. Again moving to Launceston, he built another theatre, the Majestic Theatre, which opened in 1917 and was influenced by Lucas' Ithacecian roots. "The architecture is Grecian," commented the Launceston Daily Telegraph, "and at the top one can see glimpses of the ancient Pantheon style." The paper concluded that the Majestic Theatre was one of the most modern in Australia. Lucas nominated himself as a picture theatre proprietor aged 47.

Finally returning to Melbourne in the early 1920s, Lucas purchased the Fairholme mansion in Alexandra Street, St Kilda East. He subsequently subdivided a portion of the north-eastern section of the grounds and built five residential houses in the California Bungalow style. After his death on 28 September 1931 at the height of the Great Depression, the mansion was sold, becoming a reception hall. Today, it is modified for use as the Rabbinical College of Australia & NZ.

== Personal life ==
=== Family ===
In 1895, Lucas married Elizabeth Eutrope (1864–1955), one of eight children of a chef father from Rochefort, France, and a mother from County Mayo, Ireland. Lucas and Eutrope had six children: Sylvia Maria (born 1896), Thelma, Anthony (born 1896), Homer Mareeno (5 February 1897 – 15 May 1954), Alfred Ulysses (1900–1919) and Anthony William (1905–1927). Lucas travelled with his family to New Zealand, with one of the children born during their stay in Bluff on the South Island.

=== Residences ===
A 1914 census entry listed Marino Lucas' address as 42 The Avenue, St. Kilda, whilst the 1916 Secret Census recorded seven Tasmanians of Greek birth, two of them living in Launceston.

By 1918, he was listed at 97 Westbury Street, St. Kilda and in 1922 at 62 Gourlay Street. In the 1927 census, he was shown to be residing at his final address, 67 Alexandra St., St. Kilda.

== Sources ==
- Princess Theater chandelier
