= Marino Bifulco =

Italian goalkeeper

Personal information
- Full name: Marino Bifulco
- Date of birth: August 9, 1982 (age 44)
- Place of birth: Pescara, Italy
- Height: 1.87 m (6 ft 1 1/2 in)
- Position: Goalkeeper

Team information
- Current team: Real Giulianova

Senior career*
Years	Team	Apps	(Gls)
2002–2007	RC Angolana	67	(0)
2007–2010	Valle del Giovenco	66	(0)
2010–2011	Chieti	30	(0)
2011–2012	Aprilia	34	(0)
2012–2017	Matera	85	(0)
2017–2018	Monopoli	11	(0)
2018	→ Teramo (loan)	7	(0)
2019–	Real Giulianova	6	(0)
- * Club domestic league appearances and goals as of 18:35, 18 January 2020 (UTC)

Marino Bifulco (born 9 August 1982) is an Italian goalkeeper who currently plays for Real Giulianova in the Italian Serie D.
