= List of Pultenaea species =

This is a list of Pultenaea species accepted by the Australian Plant Census and Plants of the World Online as at June 2021:

- Pultenaea acerosa R.Br. ex Benth. – bristly bush-pea (S.A., Vic.)
- Pultenaea adunca Turcz. (W.A.)
- Pultenaea alea de Kok (N.S.W.)
- Pultenaea altissima F.Muell. ex Benth. – tall bush pea (N.S.W., Qld., Vic.)
- Pultenaea arida E.Pritz. (W.A.)
- Pultenaea aristata Sieber ex DC. – bearded bush-pea, prickly bush-pea (N.S.W.)
- Pultenaea aspalathoides Meisn. (W.A.)
- Pultenaea baeuerlenii F.Muell. – Budawangs bush-pea (N.S.W.)
- Pultenaea barbata C.R.P.Andrews (W.A.)
- Pultenaea benthamii F.Muell. – Bentham's bush-pea (N.S.W., Vic.)
- Pultenaea blakelyi Joy Thomps. – Blakely's bush-pea (N.S.W., Vic.)
- Pultenaea boormanii H.B.Will. (N.S.W.)
- Pultenaea borea de Kok (Qld.)
- Pultenaea brachyphylla Turcz. (W.A.)
- Pultenaea brachytropis Benth. (W.A.)
- Pultenaea bracteamajor de Kok (Qld.)
- Pultenaea bracteaminor de Kok (Qld.)
- Pultenaea calycina (Turcz.) Benth. (W.A.)
  - Pultenaea calycina (Turcz.) Benth. subsp. calycina
  - Pultenaea calycina subsp. proxena Orthia & Chappill
- Pultenaea campbellii Maiden & Betche (N.S.W.)
- Pultenaea canaliculata F.Muell. – coast bush-pea (S.A., Vic.)
- Pultenaea canescens A.Cunn. – plumed bush-pea (N.S.W.)
- Pultenaea capitellata Sieber ex DC. – hard-head bush-pea (N.S.W., A.C.T., Vic.)
- Pultenaea cinerascens Maiden & Betche (N.S.W.)
- Pultenaea costata H.B.Will. – ribbed bush-pea (Vic.)
- Pultenaea craigiana C.F.Wilkins, Orthia & Crisp (W.A.)
- Pultenaea cuneata Benth. (Qld., N.S.W.)
- Pultenaea daena Orthia & Chappill (W.A.)
- Pultenaea daltonii H.B.Will. - hoary bush-pea (Vic.)
- Pultenaea daphnoides J.C.Wendl. — large-leaf bush-pea, large-leaf bitter-pea (Qld., N.S.W., Vic., S.A., Tas.)
- Pultenaea dargilensis Corrick & N.G.Walsh (Vic.)
- Pultenaea densifolia F.Muell. – dense-leaved bush-pea (S.A., Vic.)
- Pultenaea dentata Labill. – clustered bush-pea (S.A., VIC., N.S.W., QLD., Tas.)
- Pultenaea divaricata H.B.Will. (N.S.W.)
- Pultenaea echinula Sieber ex DC. – curved bush-pea (N.S.W.)
- Pultenaea elachista (F.Muell.) Crisp (W.A., S.A.)
- Pultenaea elusa (J.D.Briggs & Crisp) de Kok – elusive bush-pea (N.S.W.)
- Pultenaea empetrifolia Meisn. (W.A.)
- Pultenaea ericifolia Benth. ex Lindl. (W.A.)
- Pultenaea euchila DC. (Qld., N.S.W.)
- Pultenaea fasciculata Benth. – alpine bush-pea, bundled bush-pea (N.S.W., Vic., Tas.)
- Pultenaea ferruginea Rudge – large bronze bush-pea (N.S.W.)
- Pultenaea flexilis Sm. – graceful bush-pea (N.S.W., Qld.)
- Pultenaea foliolosa A.Cunn. ex Benth. – small-leaf bush-pea (Qld., N.S.W., Vic.)
- Pultenaea glabra Benth. – smooth bush-pea (N.S.W.)
- Pultenaea graveolens Tate – scented bush-pea (Vic.)
- Pultenaea gunnii Benth. – golden bush-pea (Tas., Vic., N.S.W.)
  - Pultenaea gunnii Benth. subsp. gunnii
  - Pultenaea gunnii subsp. tuberculata Corrick
- Pultenaea hartmannii F.Muell. (N.S.W., Qld.)
- Pultenaea heterochila F.Muell. (W.A.)
- Pultenaea hispidula R.Br. ex Benth. – rusty bush-pea (N.S.W., Vic., S.A.)
- Pultenaea humilis Benth. ex Hook.f. – dwarf bush-pea (N.S.W., Vic., Tas.)
- Pultenaea indira Orthia & Crisp (W.A.)
  - Pultenaea indira Orthia & Crisp subsp. indira
  - Pultenaea indira subsp. monstrosita Orthia
  - Pultenaea indira subsp. pudoides Orthia
- Pultenaea insularis J.Z.Weber (S.A.)
- Pultenaea involucrata Benth. (S.A.)
- Pultenaea juniperina Labill. – prickly bush-pea (N.S.W., A.C.T., Vic., Tas.)
- Pultenaea kraehenbuehlii P.J.Lang (S.A.)
- Pultenaea lapidosa Corrick – stony bush-pea (N.S.W., Vic.)
- Pultenaea largiflorens F.Muell. ex Benth. – twiggy bush-pea (N.S.W., Vic., S.A.)
- Pultenaea laxiflora Benth. – loose-flower bush-pea (S.A., N.S.W. A.C.T., Vic.)
- Pultenaea linophylla Schrad. & Wendl. – halo bush-pea (Qld., N.S.W., Vic.)
- Pultenaea luehmannii Maiden – thready bush-pea (Vic.)
- Pultenaea maidenii Reader – Maiden's bush-pea (Vic.)
- Pultenaea maritima de Kok – coastal bush-pea, coastal headland pea (N.S.W., Qld.)
- Pultenaea microphylla Sieber ex DC. (Qld., N.S.W., A.C.T., Vic.)
- Pultenaea millarii F.M.Bailey (Qld.)
  - Pultanaea millarii var. angustifolia H.B.Will.
  - Pultanaea millarii var. millarii F.M.Bailey
- Pultenaea mollis Lindl. – soft bush-pea, guinea flower bush pea (N.S.W., Vic., Tas.)
- Pultenaea muelleri Benth. – Mueller's bush-pea (Vic.)
- Pultenaea myrtoides A.Cunn. ex Benth. (N.S.W., Qld.)
- Pultenaea ochreata Meisn. (W.A.)
- Pultenaea paleacea Willd. – chaffy bush-pea (N.S.W., Qld.)
- Pultenaea parrisiae J.D.Briggs & Crisp – bantam bush-pea, Parris's bush-pea (N.S.W, Vic.)
- Pultenaea parviflora Sieber ex DC. – Sydney bush-pea (N.S.W.)
- Pultenaea patellifolia H.B.Will. – Mt Byron bush-pea (Vic.)
- Pultenaea pauciflora M.B.Scott – Narrogin pea (W.A.)
- Pultenaea pedunculata Hook. – matted bush-pea (S.A., N.S.W., Vic., Tas.)
- Pultenaea penna de Kok – feather bush-pea (Vic., S.A.)
- Pultenaea petiolaris A.Cunn. ex Benth. – woolly bush-pea (Qld., N.S.W.)
- Pultenaea pinifolia Meisn. (W.A.)
- Pultenaea platyphylla N.A.Wakef. – flat-leaf bush-pea (N.S.W., Vic.)
- Pultenaea polifolia A.Cunn. – dusky bush-pea (N.S.W., A.C.T., Vic.)
- Pultenaea procumbens A.Cunn. - heathy bush-pea (N.S.W., A.C.T., Vic.)
- Pultenaea prolifera H.B.Will. – Otway bush-pea (Vic.)
- Pultenaea prostrata Benth. ex Hook.f. (Vic., S.A., Tas.)
- Pultenaea purpurea (Turcz.) Crisp & Orthia (W.A.)
- Pultenaea pycnocephala F.Muell. ex Benth. (N.S.W., Qld.)
- Pultenaea radiata H.B.Will. (W.A.)
- Pultenaea rariflora de Kok (Qld.)
- Pultenaea reflexifolia (J.H.Willis) de Kok – wombat bush-pea (Vic.)
- Pultenaea reticulata (Sm.) Benth. (W.A.)
- Pultenaea retusa Sm. – notched bush-pea (Qld., N.S.W., Vic.)
- Pultenaea rigida Benth. (S.A.)
- Pultenaea robusta (H.B.Will) de Kok (N.S.W., Qld.)
- Pultenaea rodwayi Tindale ex de Kok (N.S.W.)
- Pultenaea rosmarinifolia Lindl. – rosemary bush-pea (N.S.W)
- Pultenaea rostrata de Kok (N.S.W., Qld.)
- Pultenaea rotundifolia (Turcz.) Benth. (W.A.)
- Pultenaea scabra R.Br. – rough bush-pea (S.A., Qld., N.S.W., Vic.)
- Pultenaea sericea (Benth.) Corrick – chaffy bush-pea (N.S.W., Vic., Tas.)
- Pultenaea setulosa Benth. (Qld.)
- Pultenaea skinneri F.Muell. – Skinner's pea (W.A.)
- Pultenaea spinosa (DC.) H.B.Will. (Qld., N.S.W., A.C.T., Vic.)
- Pultenaea spinulosa (Turcz.) Benth. (W.A.)
- Pultenaea stipularis Sm. – handsome bush-pea (N.S.W.)
- Pultenaea stricta Sims – rigid bush-pea (Vic., S.A., Tas.)
- Pultenaea strobilifera Meisn. (W.A.)
- Pultenaea subalpina (F.Muell.) Druce – rosy bush-pea (Vic.)
- Pultenaea subspicata Benth. – low bush-pea (N.S.W., A.C.T., Vic.)
- Pultenaea subternata H.B.Will. (N.S.W.)
- Pultenaea tarik de Kok (N.S.W.)
- Pultenaea tenella Benth. – delicate bush-pea (N.S.W., Vic.)
- Pultenaea tenuifolia R.Br. & Sims – slender bush-pea (W.A., S.A., Vic. Tas.)
- Pultenaea trichophylla H.B.Will. ex J.M.Black – tufted bush-pea (S.A.)
- Pultenaea trifida J.M.Black – Kangaroo Island bush-pea (S.A.)
- Pultenaea trinervis J.M.Black – three-nerved bush-pea (S.A.)
- Pultenaea tuberculata Pers. – wreath bush-pea (N.S.W.)
- Pultenaea verruculosa Turcz. (W.A.)
- Pultenaea vestita R.Br. (W.A., S.A.)
- Pultenaea victoriensis Corrick (Vic.)
- Pultenaea villifera Sieber ex DC. (N.S.W., S.A.)
  - Pultenaea villifera var. glabrescens J.M.Black (S.A.) – yellow bush-pea
  - Pultenaea villifera Sieber ex DC. var. villifera (N.S.W.)
- Pultenaea villosa Willd. (Qld., N.S.W.)
- Pultenaea viscidula Tate (S.A.)
- Pultenaea viscosa R.Br. ex Benth. (N.S.W.)
- Pultenaea vrolandii Maiden (N.S.W., Vic.)
- Pultenaea weindorferi Reader (Vic.) – swamp bush-pea
- Pultenaea whiteana S.T.Blake (Qld.)
- Pultenaea williamsoniana J.H.Willis (Vic.)
- Pultenaea wudjariensis Orthia (W.A.)
