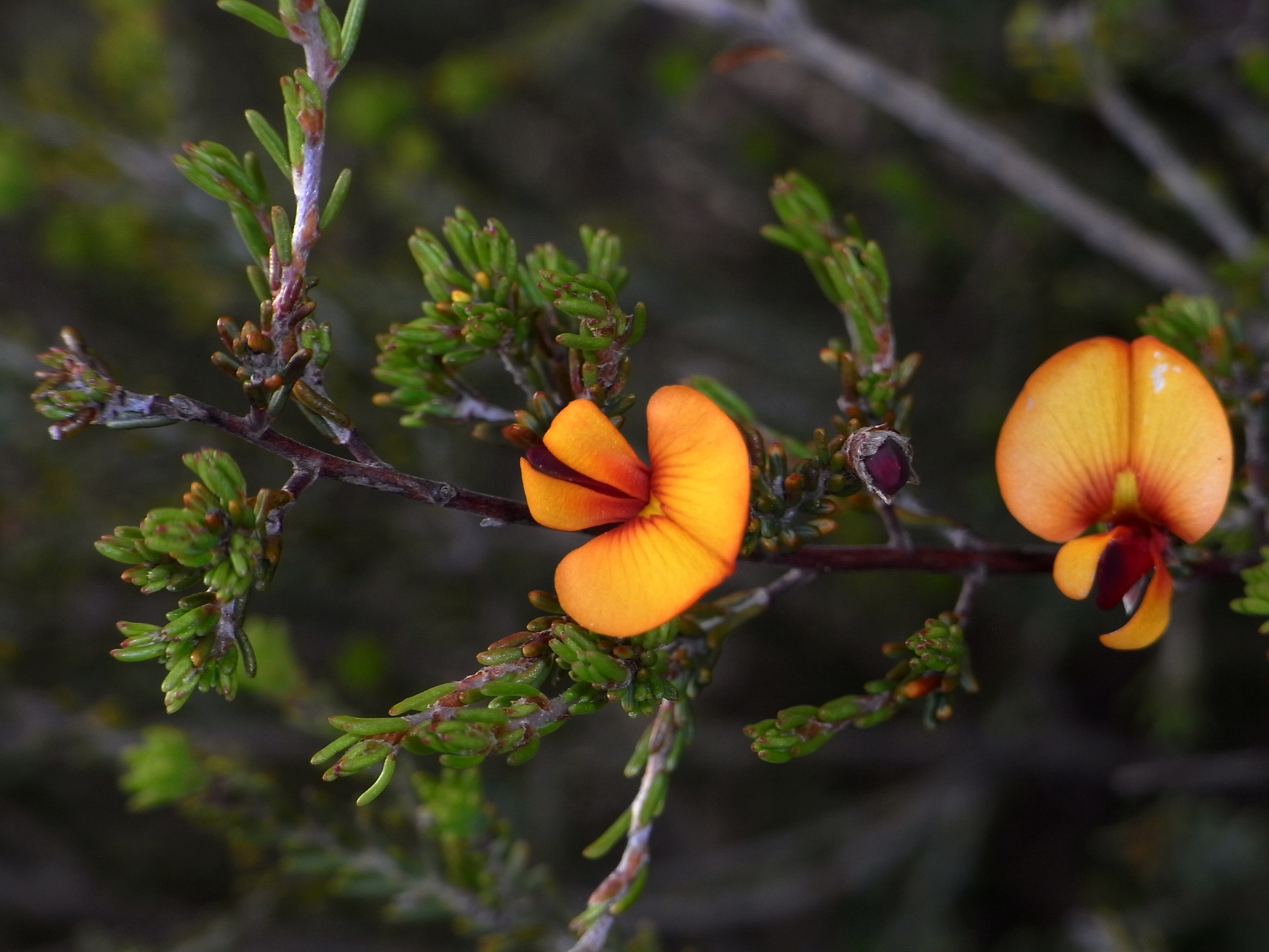

Scientific classification
- Kingdom: Plantae
- Clade: Tracheophytes
- Clade: Angiosperms
- Clade: Eudicots
- Clade: Rosids
- Order: Fabales
- Family: Fabaceae
- Subfamily: Faboideae
- Genus: Pultenaea
- Species: P. prostrata

Binomial name
- Pultenaea prostrata Benth. ex Hook.f.

Synonyms
- Pultenaea polyota Hook.f. nom. inval., pro syn.

= Pultenaea prostrata =

Silky bush-pea

Species of plant

Pultenaea prostrata, commonly known as silky bush-pea, is a species of flowering plant in the family Fabaceae and is endemic to south-eastern Australia. It is a small, rigid, wiry, low-lying or prostrate shrub with cylindrical leaves, and yellow, red and purple-brown flowers.

== Description ==
Pultenaea prostrata is a rigid, wiry, low-lying or prostrate shrub that typically grows to a height of 50 cm (20 in) and has silky-hairy young foliage. The leaves are arranged alternately, cylindrical with a groove along the upper surface, 4–8 mm (0.16–0.31 in) long with triangular stipules 1–2 mm (0.039–0.079 in) long at the base. The flowers are borne singly in leaf axils on the ends of short side shoots and are about 10 mm (0.39 in) long and sessile with six to eight broadly egg-shaped bracts 2–3.5 mm (0.079–0.138 in) long at the base. The sepals are 5–7 mm (0.20–0.28 in) long and silky-hairy with broadly egg-shaped bracteoles 4–5 mm (0.16–0.20 in) long attached to the base of the sepal tube. The standard petal is orange-yellow with red streaks, 8–10 mm (0.31–0.39 in) long, the wings are often purple-brown and the keel is deep purple-brown. Flowering occurs from September to November and the fruit is an egg-shaped pod.

== Taxonomy ==
Pultenaea prostrata was formally described in 1856 by Joseph Dalton Hooker in The Botany of the Antarctic voyage of H.M. Discovery ships Erebus and Terror. III. Flora Tasmaniae, based on an unpublished description by George Bentham.

== Distribution and habitat ==
Silky bush-pea grows in dry forest and in scattered locations in western and central areas of Victoria, in south-eastern South Australia and in the northern and southern midlands of Tasmania.

== Conservation status ==
This species of pea is relatively common in Victoria and South Australia but is listed as "vulnerable" in Tasmania under the Tasmanian Government Threatened Species Protection Act.
