= Pultenaea robusta =

Scientific classification
- Kingdom: Plantae
- Clade: Tracheophytes
- Clade: Angiosperms
- Clade: Eudicots
- Clade: Rosids
- Order: Fabales
- Family: Fabaceae
- Subfamily: Faboideae
- Genus: Pultenaea
- Species: P. robusta

Binomial name
- Pultenaea robusta (H.B.Will.) de Kok

Species of flowering plant

Pultenaea robusta is a species of flowering plant in the family Fabaceae and is endemic to eastern Australia. It is an erect shrub with hairy branches, linear leaves, and yellow to orange and red to purple, pea-like flowers.

== Description ==
Pultenaea robusta is an erect shrub that typically grows to a height of 0.5–1.0 m (1 ft 8 in – 3 ft 3 in) and has branchlets covered with hairs pressed against the surface. The leaves are linear, 20–42 mm (0.79–1.65 in) long and 2.8–3.5 mm (0.11–0.14 in) wide with stipules 7–12.5 mm (0.28–0.49 in) long at the base and pressed against the stem. The flowers are arranged in dense clusters on the ends of branches with papery, scale-like, pale brown to yellow bracts at the base. The sepals are 6.5–8.0 mm (0.26–0.31 in) long with boat-shaped to linear bracteoles 4.5–6.2 mm (0.18–0.24 in) long at the base of the sepal tube. The standard petal is yellow to orange and 8.5–16.5 mm (0.33–0.65 in) long, the standard yellow to orange and 8–10 mm (0.31–0.39 in) long the keel red to purple and 8–11 mm (0.31–0.43 in) long. Flowering mainly occurs from April to July and the fruit is a pod about 5 mm (0.20 in) long.

== Taxonomy and naming ==
This pea was first formally described in 1920 by Herbert Bennett Williamson who gave it the name Pultenaea paleacea var. robusta in the Proceedings of the Royal Society of Victoria from specimens collected near Gympie. In 2004, Rogier Petrus Johannes de Kok raised the variety to species status as Pultenaea robusta in Australian Systematic Botany.

== Distribution and habitat ==
This pultenaea grows in forest, heath or swampland from Wide Bay in Queensland to near Tweed Heads in far north-eastern New South Wales.
