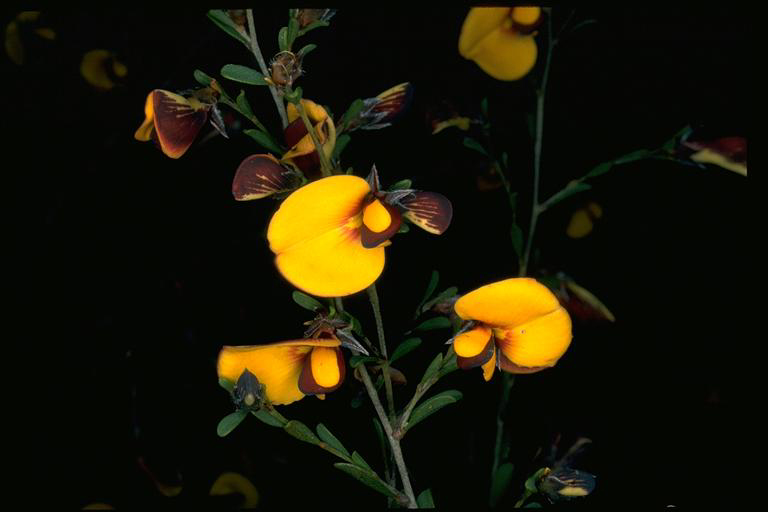
- Near Manjimup

Scientific classification
- Kingdom: Plantae
- Clade: Tracheophytes
- Clade: Angiosperms
- Clade: Eudicots
- Clade: Rosids
- Order: Fabales
- Family: Fabaceae
- Subfamily: Faboideae
- Genus: Pultenaea
- Species: P. ochreata

Binomial name
- Pultenaea ochreata Meisn.

= Pultenaea ochreata =

Species of flowering plant

Pultenaea ochreata is a species of flowering plant in the family Fabaceae and is endemic to the south-west of Western Australia. It is an erect shrub with egg-shaped leaves with the narrower end towards the base and yellow-orange flowers with red or brown marks.

== Description ==
Pultenaea ochreata is an erect shrub that typically grows to a height of up to 0.3–2 m (1 ft 0 in – 6 ft 7 in). The leaves are egg-shaped with the narrower end towards the base, 5–35 mm (0.20–1.38 in) long and 1–9 mm (0.039–0.354 in) wide with stipules at the base. The flowers are yellow-orange with red or brown marks, and sessile. The sepals are hairy and 5.5–8 mm (0.22–0.31 in) long with hairy bracteoles 2–3.5 mm (0.079–0.138 in) long at the base. The standard petal is 11–13.4 mm (0.43–0.53 in) long, the wings 9–10.5 mm (0.35–0.41 in) long and the keel 10.4–12.5 mm (0.41–0.49 in) long. Flowering occurs from July to October and the fruit is a flattened pod.

== Taxonomy and naming ==
Pultenaea ochreata was first formally described in 1844 by Carl Meissner in Lehmann's Plantae Preissianae. The specific epithet (ochreata) means "having a sheath" of stipules.

== Distribution and habitat ==
This pultenaea grows in sandy soil in winter-west places in the Jarrah Forest, Swan Coastal Plain and Warren biogeographic regions of south-western Western Australia.

== Conservation status ==
Pultenaea ochreata is classified as "not threatened" by the Government of Western Australia Department of Parks and Wildlife.
