= Pultenaea adunca =

Conservation status
- Priority Three — Poorly Known Taxa (DEC)

Scientific classification
- Kingdom: Plantae
- Clade: Tracheophytes
- Clade: Angiosperms
- Clade: Eudicots
- Clade: Rosids
- Order: Fabales
- Family: Fabaceae
- Subfamily: Faboideae
- Genus: Pultenaea
- Species: P. adunca

Binomial name
- Pultenaea adunca Turcz.

Synonyms
- Pultenaea linearifolia Strid

Species of flowering plant

Pultenaea adunca is a species of flowering plant in the family Fabaceae and is endemic to the south of Western Australia. It is an erect, spindly shrub with hairy, needle-shaped leaves and yellow and red flowers.

== Description ==
Pultenaea adunca is an erect, spindly shrub that typically grows to a height of 0.3–1.0 m (1 ft 0 in – 3 ft 3 in). The leaves are needle-shaped, 7–12 mm (0.28–0.47 in) long and 0.8–1.4 mm (0.031–0.055 in) wide and hairy with stipules at the base. The flowers are yellow and red with red and yellow markings. Each flower is borne on a pedicel 0.6–2.5 mm (0.024–0.098 in) long with hairy bracteoles 1.5–2.5 mm (0.059–0.098 in) long at the base. The sepals are 5–6 mm (0.20–0.24 in) long and hairy. The standard petal is 6.5–10.4 mm (0.26–0.41 in) long and glabrous, the wings are 6–8.5 mm (0.24–0.33 in) long and the keel 6.8–8.2 mm (0.27–0.32 in) long. Flowering occurs in March and October and the fruit is an oval pod.

== Taxonomy and naming ==
Pultenaea adunca was first formally described in 1853 by Nikolai Turczaninow in the Bulletin de la Société Impériale des Naturalistes de Moscou from specimens collected by James Drummond. The specific epithet (adunca) means "bent forward or hooked", referring to the leaves.

== Distribution ==
This pultenaea grows in the south of Western Australia between Jerramungup, Lake Grace and Esperance.

== Conservation status ==
Pultenaea adunca is classified as "Priority Three" by the Government of Western Australia Department of Parks and Wildlife meaning that it is poorly known and known from only a few locations but is not under imminent threat.
