= Pultenaea canescens =

Plumed bush-pea

Scientific classification
- Kingdom: Plantae
- Clade: Embryophytes
- Clade: Tracheophytes
- Clade: Spermatophytes
- Clade: Angiosperms
- Clade: Eudicots
- Clade: Rosids
- Order: Fabales
- Family: Fabaceae
- Subfamily: Faboideae
- Genus: Pultenaea
- Species: P. canescens

Binomial name
- Pultenaea canescens A.Cunn.

Synonyms
- Pultenaea plumosa Sieber ex DC.; Pultenaea plumosa var. canescens (A.Cunn.) Domin; Pultenaea plumosa Sieber ex DC. var. plumosa

Species of flowering plant

Pultenaea canescens, commonly known as plumed bush-pea, is a species of flowering plant in the family Fabaceae and is endemic to a small area in eastern New South Wales. It is an erect shrub with narrow elliptic to narrow egg-shaped leaves, and yellow to orange flowers with reddish-brown markings.

== Description ==
Pultenaea canaliculata is an erect or sprawling shrub that typically grows to a height of up to 1.5 m (4 ft 11 in). The leaves are narrow elliptic to narrow egg-shaped with the narrower end towards the base, 8–12 mm (0.31–0.47 in) long and 1.5–2.5 mm (0.059–0.098 in) wide with stipules 4–5 mm (0.16–0.20 in) long at the base. The flowers are borne in dense clusters near the ends of branchlets on pedicels 0.5–1 mm (0.020–0.039 in) long with hairy, linear bracteoles about 7 mm (0.28 in) long at the base of the sepals. The sepals are 7–10 mm (0.28–0.39 in) long and hairy. The standard petal is yellow to orange with reddish-brown stripes, and the wings and keel are yellow to orange. Flowering occurs from September to April and the fruit is an oval pod about 6 mm (0.24 in) long.

== Taxonomy and naming ==
Pultenaea canescens was first formally described in 1825 by Allan Cunningham in Barron Field's Geographical Memoirs on New South Wales. The specific epithet (canescens) means "somewhat white or hoary".

== Distribution and habitat ==
Plumed bush-pea grows in swampy heath in the higher Blue Mountains of New South Wales.
