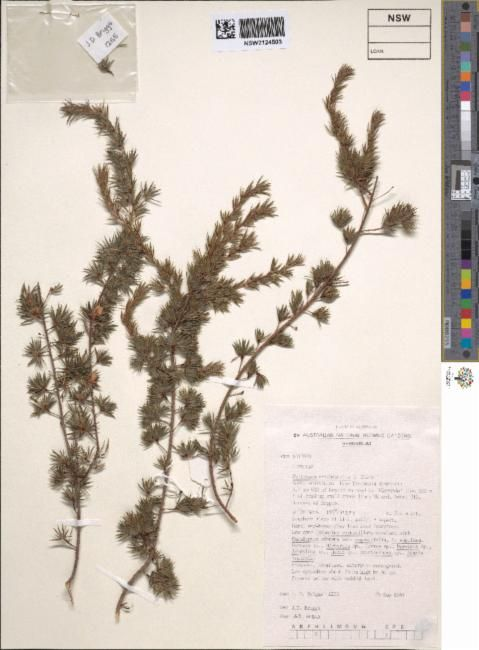

Scientific classification
- Kingdom: Plantae
- Clade: Tracheophytes
- Clade: Angiosperms
- Clade: Eudicots
- Clade: Rosids
- Order: Fabales
- Family: Fabaceae
- Subfamily: Faboideae
- Genus: Pultenaea
- Species: P. trichophylla

Binomial name
- Pultenaea trichophylla H.B.Will. ex J.M.Black

Synonyms
- Pultenaea trichophylla H.B.Will. nom. illeg., nom. superfl.

= Pultenaea trichophylla =

Tufted bush-pea

Species of plant

Pultenaea trichophylla, commonly known as tufted bush-pea, is a species of flowering plant in the family Fabaceae and is endemic to South Australia. It is a slender, prostrate to erect shrub with hairy branchlets, lance-shaped leaves, and yellow to orange and red, pea-like flowers.

== Description ==
Pultenaea trichophylla is a slender, prostrate to erect shrub that typically grows to a height of up to 20–30 cm (7.9–11.8 in) and has reddish stems that are initially softly-hairy. The leaves appear to be arranged in whorls near the ends of branchlets, and are lance-shaped, 8–10 mm (0.31–0.39 in) long, 1.0–1.5 mm (0.039–0.059 in) wide on a petiole 2–3 mm (0.079–0.118 in) long with lance-shaped stipules 1.2 mm (0.047 in) long at the base. The flowers are arranged near the ends of branchlets and are about 7 mm (0.28 in) long and are more or less sessile with two or three egg-shaped bracts at the base. The sepals are 2–3 mm (0.079–0.118 in) long with linear bracteoles about 1.5 mm (0.059 in) long at the base of the sepal tube. The standard petal is yellow-orange with a red base and 6–14 mm (0.24–0.55 in) long, the wings yellow to orange and 5.5–6.2 mm (0.22–0.24 in) long, and the keel red and 5.0–6.8 mm (0.20–0.27 in) long. Flowering mainly occurs from September to December and the fruit is an egg-shaped pod about 4 mm (0.16 in) long.

== Taxonomy ==
Pultenaea trichophylla was first formally described in 1924 by John McConnell Black in the Flora of South Australia from an unpublished description by Herbert Bennett Williamson, the type specimens collected near Port Lincoln. In 1925, H.B. Williamson published a description of Pultenaea trichophylla from the same collection, in Proceedings of the Royal Society of Victoria, but Williamson's name is illegitimate because it had already been published by Black. The specific epithet (trichophylla) means "hair-like-leaved".

== Distribution and habitat ==
This species of pultenaea grows in open woodland or mallee on the southern Eyre Peninsula.
