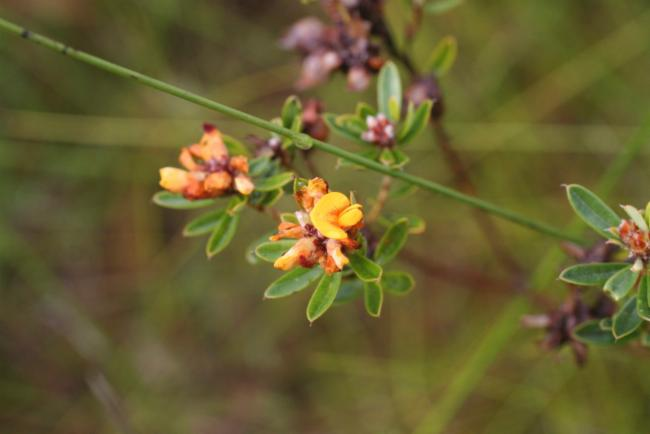
- Near Beerwah

Scientific classification
- Kingdom: Plantae
- Clade: Tracheophytes
- Clade: Angiosperms
- Clade: Eudicots
- Clade: Rosids
- Order: Fabales
- Family: Fabaceae
- Subfamily: Faboideae
- Genus: Pultenaea
- Species: P. myrtoides

Binomial name
- Pultenaea myrtoides A.Cunn. ex Benth.

= Pultenaea myrtoides =

Species of legume

Pultenaea myrtoides is a species of flowering plant in the family Fabaceae and is endemic to eastern Australia. It is an erect shrub with egg-shaped leaves with the narrower end towards the base, pea-like flowers and flattened fruit.

== Description ==
Pultenaea myrtoides is an erect shrub with stems that have soft hairs pressed against the surface. The leaves are egg-shaped with the narrower end towards the base, 5–20 mm (0.20–0.79 in) long and 2–7 mm (0.079–0.276 in) wide, with stipules 3–5 mm (0.12–0.20 in) long at the base. The lower surface of the leaves is paler than the upper surface. The flowers are arranged in dense clusters on the ends of branches and are 7–10 mm (0.28–0.39 in) long, each flower on a pedicel about 1 mm (0.039 in) long. There are two- or three-lobed, egg-shaped to spatula-shaped bracts 4–5 mm (0.16–0.20 in) long at the base. The sepals are 5–8 mm (0.20–0.31 in) long and densely hairy with keeled bracteoles 3–4 mm (0.12–0.16 in) long attached near the base of the sepal tube. The fruit is a flattened pod about 6 mm (0.24 in) long.

== Taxonomy ==
Pultenaea myrtoides was first formally described in 1837 by George Bentham from an unpublished description by Allan Cunningham. Bentham's description was published in his book Commentationes de Leguminosarum Generibus. The specific epithet (myrtoides) means "myrtle-like".

== Distribution and habitat ==
This pultenaea grows in heath and forest on the coast and tablelands of south-east Queensland and north-eastern New South Wales as far south as Port Stephens.
