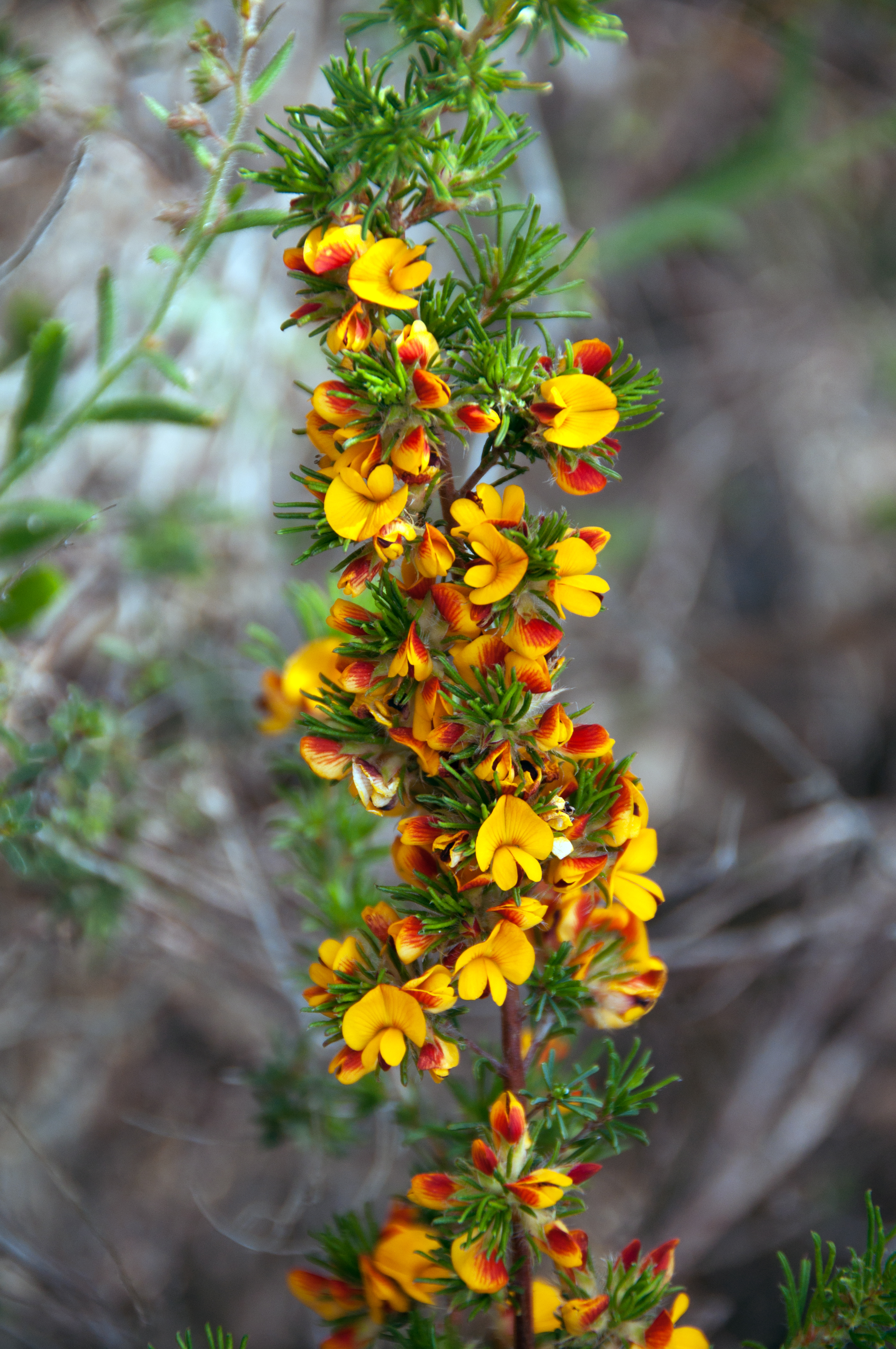
- Pultenaea acerosa in Para Wirra Conservation Park

Scientific classification
- Kingdom: Plantae
- Clade: Tracheophytes
- Clade: Angiosperms
- Clade: Eudicots
- Clade: Rosids
- Order: Fabales
- Family: Fabaceae
- Subfamily: Faboideae
- Genus: Pultenaea
- Species: P. acerosa

Binomial name
- Pultenaea acerosa R.Br. ex Benth.

= Pultenaea acerosa =

Bristly bush-pea

Species of flowering plant

Pultenaea acerosa, commonly known as bristly bush-pea, is a species of flowering plant in the family Fabaceae and is endemic to south-eastern continental Australia. It is a rigid, much-branched shrub with glabrous, grooved, needle-shaped leaves and yellow flowers with red veins.

== Description ==
Pultenaea acerosa is a rigid, much-branched shrub that typically grows to a height of 30–60 cm (12–24 in) with hairy stems that are woolly-hairy when young. The leaves are linear to needle-shaped, 5–10 mm (0.20–0.39 in) long, grooved on the upper surface and tapering to a stiff, sharply pointed tip. The flowers are borne singly in up to ten leaf axils at the ends of the branchlets, and are more or less sessile with bracteoles attached to the base of the sepals. The sepals are pink, 5–7 mm (0.20–0.28 in) long and taper to a rigid, sharply-pointed tip. The standard petal is yellow with red veins, egg-shaped, about 7–8 mm (0.28–0.31 in) long and wide. The wings are oblong and the keel is semicircular with a dark red tip. Flowering occurs from August to December and the fruit is an oval pod 3–4 mm (0.12–0.16 in) long.

== Taxonomy and naming ==
Pultenaea acerosa was first formally described in 1864 by George Bentham in Flora Australiensis from an unpublished description by Robert Brown. The specific epithet (acerosa) means "needle-shaped", referring to the leaves.

== Distribution ==
This pultenaea grows in the far south-east of South Australia and in the extreme west of Victoria.
