= Pultenaea rotundifolia =

Scientific classification
- Kingdom: Plantae
- Clade: Tracheophytes
- Clade: Angiosperms
- Clade: Eudicots
- Clade: Rosids
- Order: Fabales
- Family: Fabaceae
- Subfamily: Faboideae
- Genus: Pultenaea
- Species: P. rotundifolia

Binomial name
- Pultenaea rotundifolia (Turcz.) Benth.

Synonyms
- Bossiaea strigillosa Benth.; Euchilus crinipodus F.Muell.; Euchilus rotundifolius Turcz.

Species of flowering plant

Pultenaea rotundifolia is a species of flowering plant in the family Fabaceae and is endemic to the south of Western Australia. It is a straggling, spreading shrub with flat, glabrous leaves, and yellow flowers with red markings.

== Description ==
Pultenaea rotundifolia is a straggling, spreading shrub that typically grows to a height of 15–40 cm (5.9–15.7 in) and has glabrous stems. The leaves are flat, 1–6 mm (0.039–0.236 in) long and 1–3 mm (0.039–0.118 in) wide with stipules 1.2–3 mm (0.047–0.118 in) long at the base. The flowers are yellow with red marking, each flower on a hairy pedicel 5.2–9 mm (0.20–0.35 in) long with bracteoles 1.0–1.4 mm (0.039–0.055 in) long attached to the pedicel. The sepals are hairy, 2.5–5.6 mm (0.098–0.220 in) long, the standard petal 3–6 mm (0.12–0.24 in) long, the wings 4.0–4.5 mm (0.16–0.18 in) long and the keel 4.0–5.2 mm (0.16–0.20 in) long. Flowering occurs from September to December and the fruit is a flattened pod.

== Taxonomy and naming ==
This species was first formally described in 1853 by Nikolai Turczaninow who gave it the name Euchilus rotundifolius in the Bulletin de la Société impériale des naturalistes de Moscou from specimens collected by James Drummond. In 1864, George Bentham changed the name to Pultenaea rotundifolia in Flora Australiensis. The specific epithet (rotundifolia) means "round-leaved".

== Distribution ==
This pultenaea grows on undulating plains in the Avon Wheatbelt, Esperance Plains and Mallee biogeographic regions in the south of Western Australia.

== Conservation status ==
Pultenaea rotundifolia is classified as "not threatened" by the Government of Western Australia Department of Biodiversity, Conservation and Attractions.
