= Pultenaea kraehenbuehlii =

Scientific classification
- Kingdom: Plantae
- Clade: Tracheophytes
- Clade: Angiosperms
- Clade: Eudicots
- Clade: Rosids
- Order: Fabales
- Family: Fabaceae
- Subfamily: Faboideae
- Genus: Pultenaea
- Species: P. kraehenbuehlii

Binomial name
- Pultenaea kraehenbuehlii P.J.Lang

Species of flowering plant

Pultenaea kraehenbuehlii is a species of flowering plant in the family Fabaceae and is endemic to a restricted area of South Australia. It is a dense, erect, many-branched shrub with hairy branches, narrowly egg-shaped to lance-shaped leaves with the narrower end towards the base, and yellow-orange and red flowers.

== Description ==
Pultenaea kraehenbuehlii is a dense, erect, many-branched shrub that typically grows to a height of up to 1.5 m (4 ft 11 in) and has glabrous branchlets. The leaves are arranged alternately, narrowly egg-shaped to lance-shaped with the narrower end towards the base, mostly 4–9 mm (0.16–0.35 in) long and 2–3 mm (0.079–0.118 in) wide on a petiole 0.4–0.9 mm (0.016–0.035 in) long with stipules 0.5–1.0 mm (0.020–0.039 in) long at the base. The flowers are arranged in small groups near the ends of branches, each flower 7.5–9 mm (0.30–0.35 in) long on a pedicel 1.8–3 mm (0.071–0.118 in) long with overlapping bracts 5–6 mm (0.20–0.24 in) long at the base. The sepals are 4–5 mm (0.16–0.20 in) long with egg-shaped bracteoles 2.5–3 mm (0.098–0.118 in) long attached to the side of the sepal tube. The standard petal is yellow-orange with a red base, 11.5–14 mm (0.45–0.55 in) wide and 8–10 mm (0.31–0.39 in) high, the wings 8.5–9.5 mm (0.33–0.37 in) long, and the keel is red and 6.5–8 mm (0.26–0.31 in) long. The fruit is an oval pod 7.4–8.8 mm (0.29–0.35 in) long.

== Taxonomy and naming ==
Pultenaea kraehenbuehlii was first formally described in 1998 by Peter J. Lang in the Journal of the Adelaide Botanic Gardens from specimens he collected in the Northern Mount Lofty Ranges. The specific epithet (kraehenbuehlii) the South Australian botanist Darrell N. Kraehenbuehl.

== Distribution ==
This pultenaea is restricted to the Tothill Range and nearby Spring Hill in the Mount Lofty Ranges of South Australia.
