= Pultenaea purpurea =

Scientific classification
- Kingdom: Plantae
- Clade: Tracheophytes
- Clade: Angiosperms
- Clade: Eudicots
- Clade: Rosids
- Order: Fabales
- Family: Fabaceae
- Subfamily: Faboideae
- Genus: Pultenaea
- Species: P. purpurea

Binomial name
- Pultenaea purpurea (Turcz.) Crisp & Orthia

Species of flowering plant

Pultenaea purpurea is a species of flowering plant in the family Fabaceae and is endemic to the south of Western Australia. It is a small prostrate shrub with cylindrical leaves and yellow-orange and red flowers.

== Description ==
Pultenaea purpurea is a prostrate shrub that typically grows to a height of 5–20 cm (2.0–7.9 in). The leaves are cylindrical, 10–55 mm (0.39–2.17 in) long, 1.0–1.2 mm (0.039–0.047 in) wide and hairy with stipules 4–5 mm (0.16–0.20 in) long at the base. The flowers are yellow-orange with red or purplish marks, each flower on a hairy pedicel about 1 mm (0.039 in) long. The sepals are hairy and 7–8 mm (0.28–0.31 in) long with hairy bracteoles 5.0–5.5 mm (0.20–0.22 in) long at the base. The standard petal is 7.5–9 mm (0.30–0.35 in) long, the wings 7.5–8.0 mm (0.30–0.31 in) long and the keel 7.5–8.5 mm (0.30–0.33 in) long. Flowering mainly occurs from September to December and the fruit is a flattened pod.

== Taxonomy and naming ==
This species was first formally described in 1853 by Nikolai Turczaninow who gave it the name Euchilus purpureus in the Bulletin de la Société impériale des naturalistes de Moscou. In 2005 Michael Douglas Crisp and L.A. Orthia changed the name to Pultenaea purpurea in Australian Systematic Botany.

== Distribution and habitat ==
This pultenaea grows on flats, depressions and slopes in the Coolgardie, Esperance Plains and Mallee biogeographic regions of southern Western Australia.

== Conservation status ==
Pultenaea purpurea is classified as "not threatened" by the Government of Western Australia Department of Parks and Wildlife.
