= Pultenaea pinifolia =

Conservation status
- Priority Three — Poorly Known Taxa (DEC)

Scientific classification
- Kingdom: Plantae
- Clade: Tracheophytes
- Clade: Angiosperms
- Clade: Eudicots
- Clade: Rosids
- Order: Fabales
- Family: Fabaceae
- Subfamily: Faboideae
- Genus: Pultenaea
- Species: P. pinifolia

Binomial name
- Pultenaea pinifolia Meisn.

Species of flowering plant

Pultenaea pinifolia is a species of flowering plant in the family Fabaceae and is endemic to the south-west of Western Australia. It is an erect, slender shrub with pine-like leaves and yellow-orange flowers with orange marks.

== Description ==
Pultenaea pinifolia is an erect shrub that typically grows to a height of 1–3 m (3 ft 3 in – 9 ft 10 in). The leaves are pine-like, 20–35 mm (0.79–1.38 in) long and 0.7–1 mm (0.028–0.039 in) wide with stipules 1.5–2 mm (0.059–0.079 in) long at the base. The flowers are yellow-orange with orange marks, each flower on a pedicel 3.5–4.5 mm (0.14–0.18 in) long. The sepals are hairy and 6.5–7 mm (0.26–0.28 in) long with hairy bracteoles 5–6.5 mm (0.20–0.26 in) long at the base. The standard petal is 10–11 mm (0.39–0.43 in) long, the wings 9.0–9.5 mm (0.35–0.37 in) long and the keel 9–10 mm (0.35–0.39 in) long. Flowering occurs from October to November and the fruit is a pod 10–11 mm (0.39–0.43 in) long.

== Taxonomy and naming ==
Pultenaea pinifolia was first formally described in 1848 by Carl Meissner in Lehmann's Plantae Preissianae. The specific epithet (pinifolia) means "pine-leaved".

== Distribution and habitat ==
This pultenaea grows on floodplains and in swampy areas in the Esperance Plains, Jarrah Forest, Swan Coastal Plain and Warren biogeographic regions of south-western Western Australia.

== Conservation status ==
Pultenaea pinifolia is classified as "Priority Three" by the Government of Western Australia Department of Parks and Wildlife meaning that it is poorly known and known from only a few locations but is not under imminent threat.
