= Pultenaea insularis =

Scientific classification
- Kingdom: Plantae
- Clade: Tracheophytes
- Clade: Angiosperms
- Clade: Eudicots
- Clade: Rosids
- Order: Fabales
- Family: Fabaceae
- Subfamily: Faboideae
- Genus: Pultenaea
- Species: P. insularis

Binomial name
- Pultenaea insularis J.Z.Weber

Species of flowering plant

Pultenaea insularis is a species of flowering plant in the family Fabaceae and is endemic to Kangaroo Island in South Australia. It is a spreading to prostrate shrub with wiry branches, elliptic leaves, and yellow and red flowers.

== Description ==
Pultenaea insularis is a spreading to prostrate shrub that typically grows to a height of up to 60 cm (24 in) and has wiry, reddish-green, softly-hairy branches. The leaves are elliptic, 2.5–6 mm (0.098–0.236 in) long and 1.5–3 mm (0.059–0.118 in) wide on a petiole about 0.5 mm (0.020 in) long with triangular stipules 1.5–2 mm (0.059–0.079 in) long at the base. The flowers are arranged singly near the ends of branches on a peduncle 10–16 mm (0.39–0.63 in) long with two narrow lance-shaped bracteoles 1.5–2 mm (0.059–0.079 in) long at the base of the sepal tube. The sepal tube is about 0.3 mm (0.012 in) long, the lower three lobes shorter than the upper two but longer than the tube. The standard petal is yellow with a red base, about 5 mm (0.20 in) long and 6 mm (0.24 in) wide, the wings are bright yellow, about 5 mm (0.20 in) long and 2 mm (0.079 in) wide, and the keel is slightly shorter than the wings. Flowering occurs from November to December and the fruit is an oval pod about 4 mm (0.16 in) long.

== Taxonomy and naming ==
Pultenaea insularis was first formally described in 1995 by Joseph Zvonko Weber in Journal of the Adelaide Botanic Gardens from specimens collected in Beyeria Conservation Park in 1992. The specific epithet (insularis) refers to the type location on Kangaroo Island.

== Distribution and habitat ==
This pultenaea grows in open forest often matted around tree trunks or in high grass and is only known from the eastern end of Kangaroo Island in South Australia.
