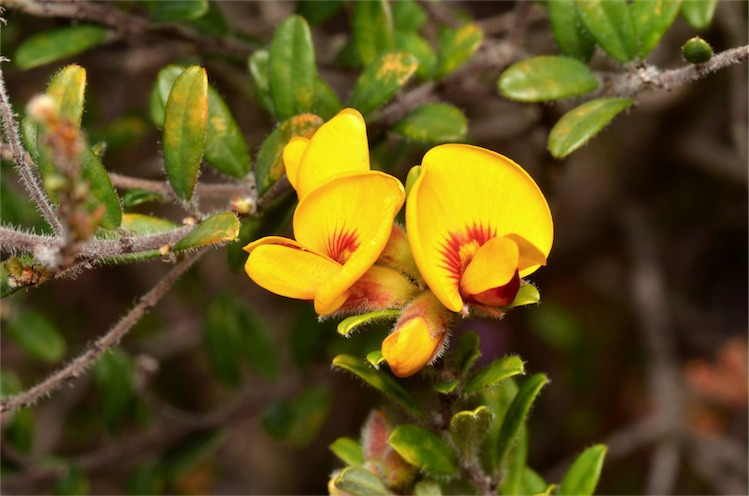
- In the Australian National Botanic Gardens

Scientific classification
- Kingdom: Plantae
- Clade: Tracheophytes
- Clade: Angiosperms
- Clade: Eudicots
- Clade: Rosids
- Order: Fabales
- Family: Fabaceae
- Subfamily: Faboideae
- Genus: Pultenaea
- Species: P. tarik

Binomial name
- Pultenaea tarik de Kok

= Pultenaea tarik =

Species of flowering plant

Pultenaea tarik is a species of flowering plant in the family Fabaceae and is endemic to the Gibraltar Range National Park in New South Wales. It is an erect shrub with hairy, arching branchlets, elliptic to egg-shaped leaves with the narrower end towards the base, and yellow to orange and red to purple, pea-like flowers.

== Description ==
Pultenaea tarik is an erect shrub that typically grows to a height of 0.15–1.5 m (5.9 in – 4 ft 11.1 in) and has hairy, arching branchlets. The leaves are linear to egg-shaped with the narrower end towards the base, mostly 4–22 mm (0.16–0.87 in) long and 2.0–6.5 mm (0.079–0.256 in) wide with stipules 1–2 mm (0.039–0.079 in) long at the base. The upper surface of the leaves is glabrous but the lower surface is hairy. The flowers are borne in dense, leafy groups near the ends of the branchlets, and are 8–12 mm (0.31–0.47 in) long, each flower on a pedicel 1–2 mm (0.039–0.079 in) long with linear, tapering bracteoles 1.5–4 mm (0.059–0.157 in) long at the side of the sepal tube. The sepals are 5.0–6.5 mm (0.20–0.26 in) long, the standard yellow to orange and 8–12 mm (0.31–0.47 in) long, the wings yellow to orange and 8.2–12 mm (0.32–0.47 in) long and the keel red to purple and 10–11 mm (0.39–0.43 in) long. Flowering occurs from September to October and the fruit is a flattened pod 5.5–7.0 mm (0.22–0.28 in) long.

== Taxonomy and naming ==
Pultenaea tarik was first formally described in 2004 by Rogier Petrus Johannes de Kok in Australian Systematic Botany from specimens collected by Bob Coveny near Dandahra Falls in the Gibraltar Range National Park in 1993. The specific epithet (tarik) refers to the Gibraltar Range National Park.

== Distribution and habitat ==
This pultenaea grows in forest on granite in the Gibraltar Range National Park in northern New South Wales.
