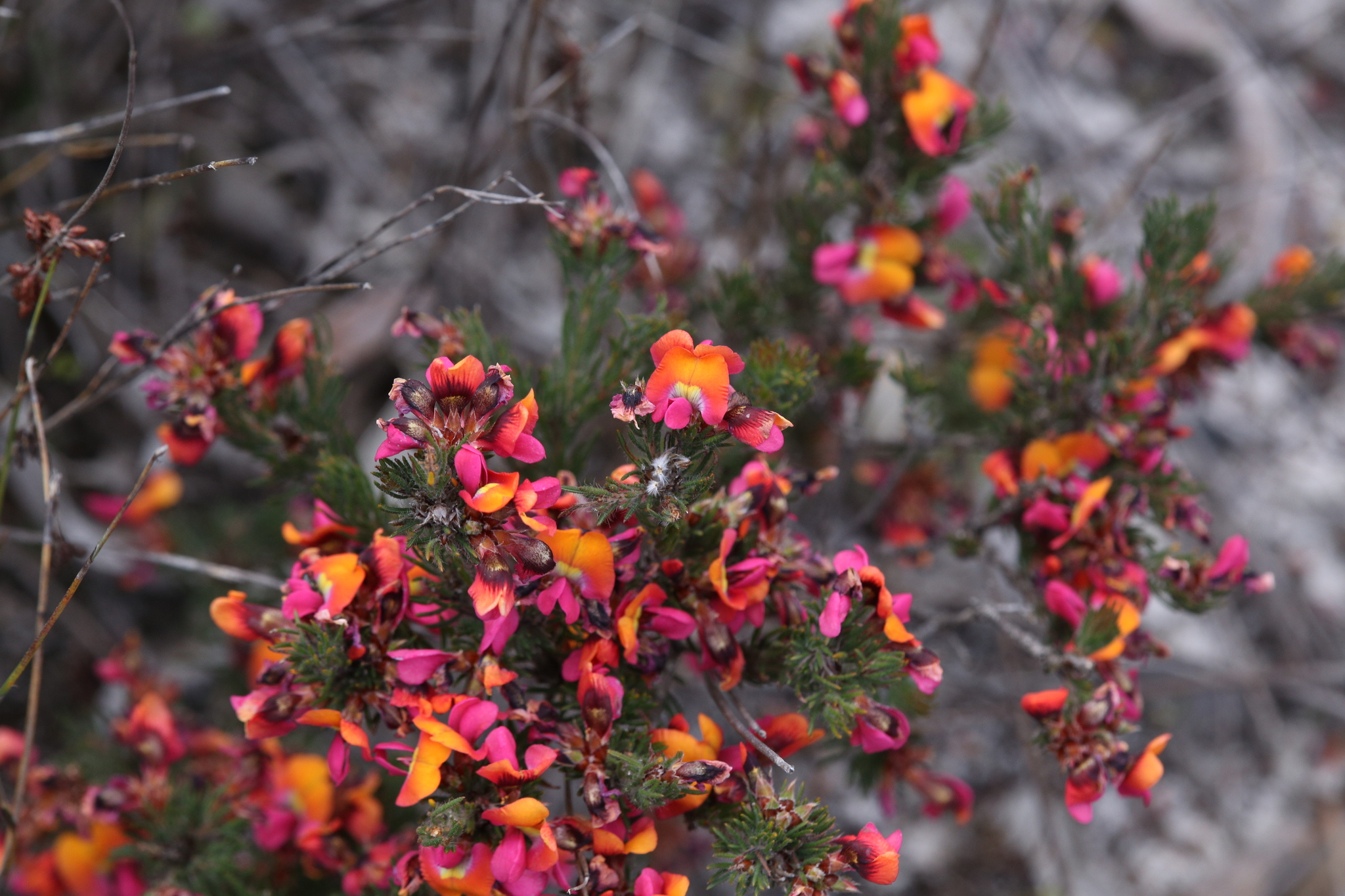

Scientific classification
- Kingdom: Plantae
- Clade: Tracheophytes
- Clade: Angiosperms
- Clade: Eudicots
- Clade: Rosids
- Order: Fabales
- Family: Fabaceae
- Subfamily: Faboideae
- Genus: Pultenaea
- Species: P. radiata

Binomial name
- Pultenaea radiata H.B.Will.

= Pultenaea radiata =

Species of flowering plant

Pultenaea radiata is a species of flowering plant in the family Fabaceae and is endemic to the south-west of Western Australia. It is an erect, open shrub with linear, needle-shaped, grooved leaves, and clusters of red and pinkish-purple flowers.

== Description ==
Pultenaea radiata is an erect, open shrub that typically grows to a height of 15–50 cm (5.9–19.7 in) and has hairy stems. The leaves are arranged in opposite pairs, linear to needle-shaped, 4.5–11 mm (0.18–0.43 in) long and 0.5–1 mm (0.020–0.039 in) wide with one or two grooves along the lower surface and stipules 1.5–2.6 mm (0.059–0.102 in) long at the base. The flowers are red and pinkish-purple, arranged in clusters with bracteoles 4.5–5.0 mm (0.18–0.20 in) long attached to the pedicel. The sepals are 7–9 mm (0.28–0.35 in) long, the standard petal 14–18 mm (0.55–0.71 in) long, the wings 9.5–11 mm (0.37–0.43 in) long and the keel 7.5–6.0 mm (0.30–0.24 in) long. Flowering occurs from September to October and the fruit is a flattened pod.

== Taxonomy and naming ==
Pultenaea radiata was first formally described in 1921 by Herbert Bennett Williamson in the Proceedings of the Royal Society of Victoria. The specific epithet (radiata) means "radiating outwards", apparently referring to the leaves.

== Distribution ==
This pultenaea is found in the Jarrah Forest, Swan Coastal Plain and Warren biogeographic regions of south-western Western Australia.

== Conservation status ==
Pultenaea radiata is classified as "not threatened" by the Government of Western Australia Department of Parks and Wildlife.
