= Pultenaea strobilifera =

Scientific classification
- Kingdom: Plantae
- Clade: Tracheophytes
- Clade: Angiosperms
- Clade: Eudicots
- Clade: Rosids
- Order: Fabales
- Family: Fabaceae
- Subfamily: Faboideae
- Genus: Pultenaea
- Species: P. strobilifera

Binomial name
- Pultenaea strobilifera Meisn.

Synonyms
- Pultenaea pteronioides Turcz.

Species of flowering plant

Pultenaea strobilifera is a species of flowering plant in the family Fabaceae and is endemic to the south-west of Western Australia. It is an open to dense, domed or spindly, erect shrub with simple leaves and yellow-orange and salmon pink to bright pink flowers.

== Description ==
Pultenaea strobilifera is an open to dense, domed or spindly, erect shrub that typically grows to a height of 15–50 cm (5.9–19.7 in) and has hairy stems. The leaves are arranged alternately along the stems, simple, 2.5–9 mm (0.098–0.354 in) long and 0.8–1.2 mm (0.031–0.047 in) wide with the edges rolled under and stipules at the base. The flowers are sessile and arranged in groups of up to ten with partly fused bracts 5.5–6.5 mm (0.22–0.26 in) long at the base. The sepals are hairy and 7.0–7.5 mm (0.28–0.30 in) long with bracteoles at the base. The standard petal is yellow-orange with a salmon pink to bright pink base and 13.5–14.5 mm (0.53–0.57 in) long, the wings 9.6–11.5 mm (0.38–0.45 in) long and the keel 9.0–10.5 mm (0.35–0.41 in) long. Flowering occurs from September to early November and the fruit is a flattened pod.

== Taxonomy and naming ==
Pultenaea strobilifera was first formally described in 1844 by Carl Meissner in Lehmann's Plantae Preissianae from specimens collected by James Drummond. The specific epithet (strobilifera) means "pine-cone bearing".

== Distribution and habitat ==
This pultenaea grows on plains, hills, sand dunes and swampy areas in woodland and heath in the Avon Wheatbelt, Esperance Plains, Jarrah Forest and Mallee biogeographic regions of south-western Western Australia.

== Conservation status ==
Pultenaea strobilifera is classified as "not threatened" by the Government of Western Australia Department of Parks and Wildlife.
