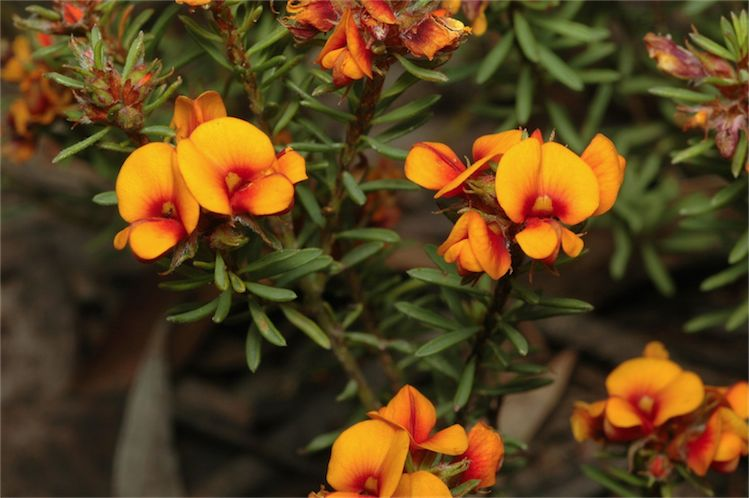
- Pultenaea subspicata

Scientific classification
- Kingdom: Plantae
- Clade: Tracheophytes
- Clade: Angiosperms
- Clade: Eudicots
- Clade: Rosids
- Order: Fabales
- Family: Fabaceae
- Subfamily: Faboideae
- Genus: Pultenaea
- Species: P. subspicata

Binomial name
- Pultenaea subspicata Benth.

= Pultenaea subspicata =

Low bush-pea

Species of plant

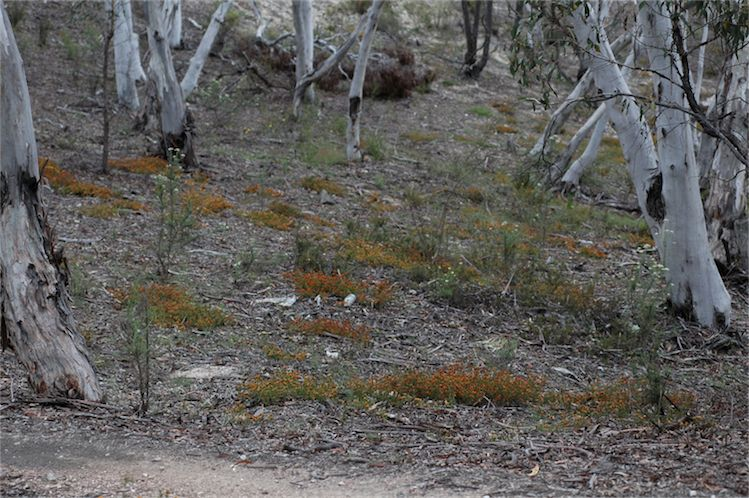
Habit near Nerriga

Pultenaea subspicata, commonly known as low bush-pea, is a species of flowering plant in the family Fabaceae and is endemic to south-eastern continental Australia. It is a low-lying, prostrate or mat-forming shrub with elliptic leaves and yellow to pink and orange-red, pea-like flowers.

== Description ==
Pultenaea subspicata is a low-lying, prostrate or mat-forming shrub that typically grows to a height of up to 60 cm (24 in) and has hairy stems when young. The leaves are arranged alternately along the branches, elliptic to egg-shaped with the narrower end towards the base, 3–8 mm (0.12–0.31 in) long, 1.0–1.5 mm (0.039–0.059 in) wide with stipules 1.5–2.0 mm (0.059–0.079 in) long at the base and pressed against the surface. The flowers are arranged in dense clusters near the ends of branches, with enlarged stipules at the base of the floral leaves. The sepals are 5–7 mm (0.20–0.28 in) long with linear, partly hairy, three-lobed bracteoles 3–5 mm (0.12–0.20 in) long attached to the base of the sepal tube. The standard petal is yellow to pink or orange-red and 7.6–9.5 mm (0.30–0.37 in) wide, the wings yellow to pink or orange-red 7.2–9.0 mm (0.28–0.35 in) long, and the keel orange to reddish-brown and 7.2–8.5 mm (0.28–0.33 in) long. Flowering occurs from August to January and the fruit is a glabrous, egg-shaped pod about 4.5 mm (0.18 in) long.

== Taxonomy ==
Pultenaea subspicata was first formally described in 1864 by George Bentham in Flora Australiensis. The specific epithet (subspicata) means "almost spicate".

== Distribution and habitat ==
Low bush-pea grows in forest, woodland and heathland, usually in stony places and is found on the coast and tablelands of New South Wales south from the Macleay River to a few places in far eastern Victoria.
