= Pultenaea prolifera =

Otway bush-pea

Scientific classification
- Kingdom: Plantae
- Clade: Tracheophytes
- Clade: Angiosperms
- Clade: Eudicots
- Clade: Rosids
- Order: Fabales
- Family: Fabaceae
- Subfamily: Faboideae
- Genus: Pultenaea
- Species: P. prolifera

Binomial name
- Pultenaea prolifera H.B.Will.

Species of flowering plant

Pultenaea prolifera, commonly known as Otway bush-pea, is a species of flowering plant in the family Fabaceae and is endemic to the south coast of Victoria. It is an erect shrub with needle-shaped leaves, and yellow and red pea-like flowers arranged singly in leaf axils on the ends of short side branches.

== Description ==
Pultenaea prolifera is an erect shrub that typically grows to a height of up to 2 m (6 ft 7 in), often with long, pendulous branches. The leaves are needle-shaped, 4–10 mm (0.16–0.39 in) long and 0.5–1 mm (0.020–0.039 in) wide with lance-shaped stipules 1–3 mm (0.039–0.118 in) long at the base. The flowers are arranged in one or two leaf axils on the ends of short side branches with hairy, broadly egg-shaped bracts at the base. The sepals are 4–6 mm (0.16–0.24 in) long with hairy, broadly egg-shaped bracteoles 3–4 mm (0.12–0.16 in) long at the base of the sepal tube. The standard petal is 8–10 mm (0.31–0.39 in) wide and yellow with a red base. The fruit is a pod surrounded by the remains of the sepals.

== Taxonomy and naming ==
Pultenaea prolifera was first formally described in 1922 by Herbert Bennett Williamson in the Proceedings of the Royal Society of Victoria from specimens collected near the Otway Forest in 1921.

== Distribution and habitat ==
This pultenaea grows in the heathy understorey of forest in near-coastal areas of western Victoria.
