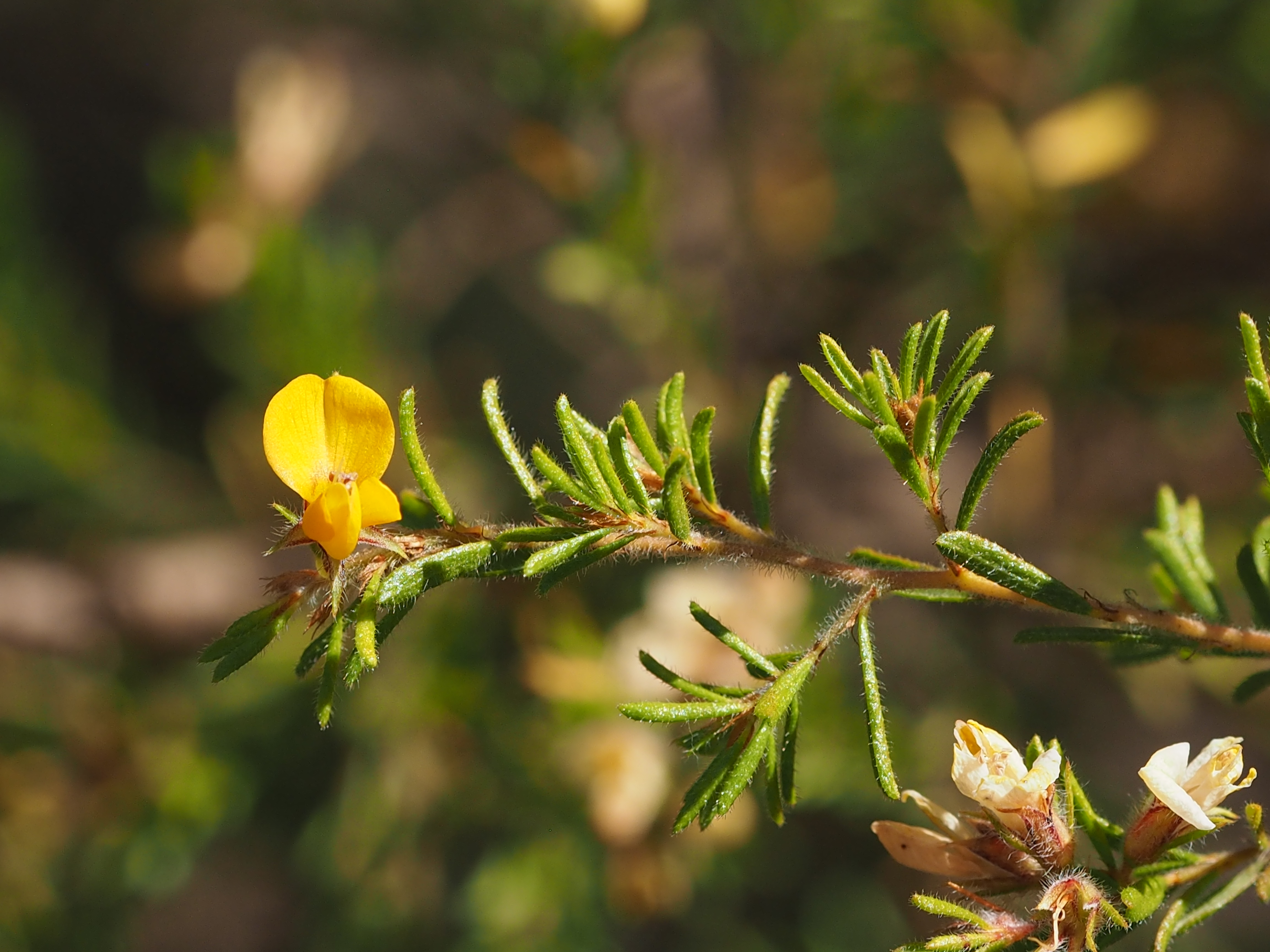

Scientific classification
- Kingdom: Plantae
- Clade: Tracheophytes
- Clade: Angiosperms
- Clade: Eudicots
- Clade: Rosids
- Order: Fabales
- Family: Fabaceae
- Subfamily: Faboideae
- Genus: Pultenaea
- Species: P. alea

Binomial name
- Pultenaea alea de Kok

= Pultenaea alea =

Species of flowering plant

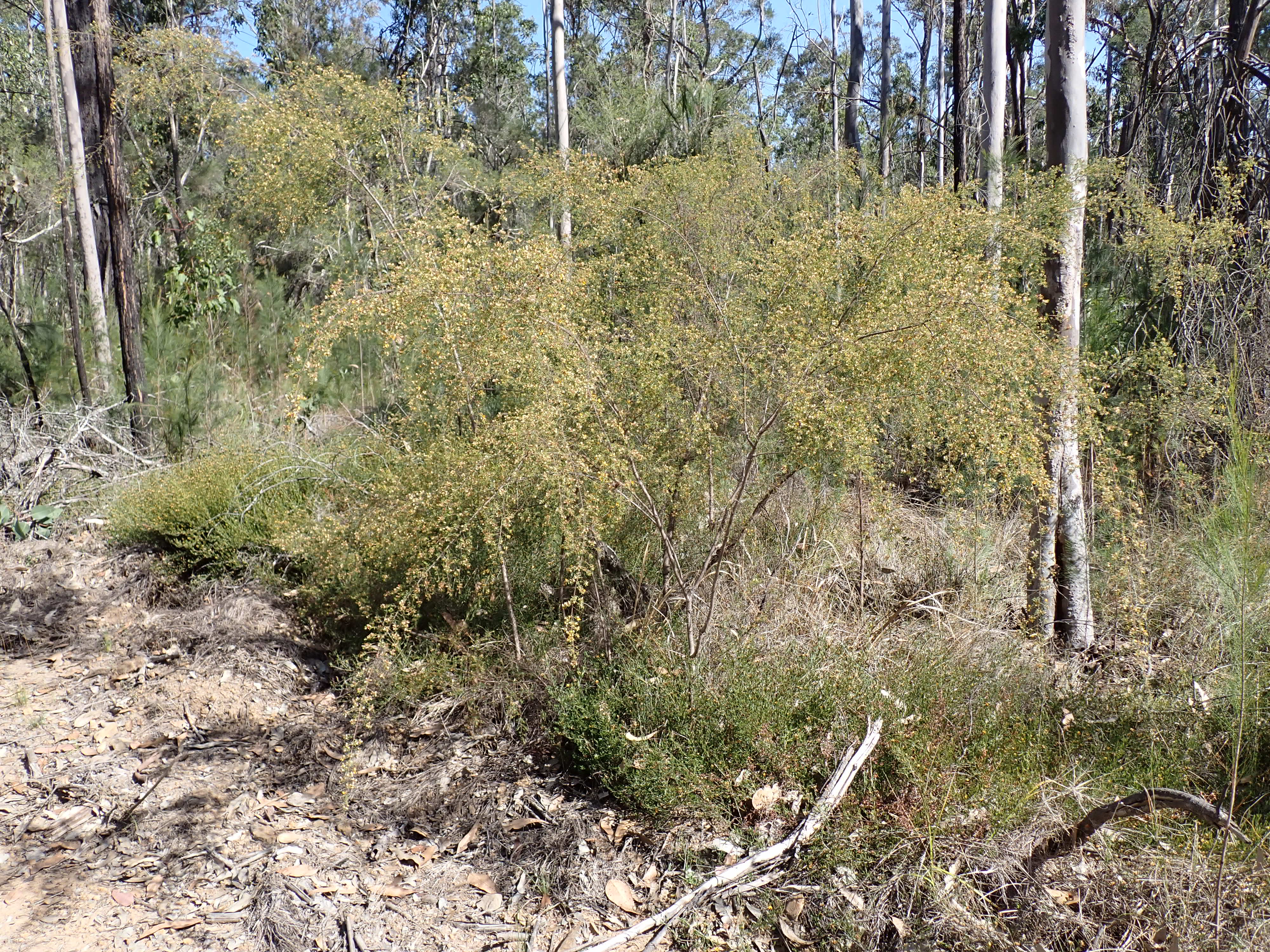
Habit in the Gibberagee State Forest, near Whiporie

Pultenaea alea is a species of flowering plant in the family Fabaceae and is endemic to New South Wales. It is an erect shrub with linear leaves and pea-like flowers arranged near the ends of branchlets.

== Description ==
Pultenaea alea is an erect shrub with sparsely hairy stems. The leaves are linear, 4.5–10 mm (0.18–0.39 in) long and 1–2 mm (0.039–0.079 in) wide with stipules 0.5–2 mm (0.020–0.079 in) long at the base, the upper and lower surfaces a similar shade of green. The flowers are borne among leaves at the ends of the branchlets, and are 7.5–15 mm (0.30–0.59 in) long, each flower on a pedicel up to about 10 mm (0.39 in) long with linear to egg-shaped bracteoles 1–1.5 mm (0.039–0.059 in) long at the base of the sepals. The sepals are 5–8 mm (0.20–0.31 in) long. Flowering occurs from August to March and the fruit is an oval pod 8–9 mm (0.31–0.35 in) long.

== Taxonomy and naming ==
Pultenaea alea was first formally described in 2002 by Rogier Petrus Johannes de Kok in Australian Systematic Botany from specimens collected near Casino in 2000. The specific epithet (alea) refers to the town, Casino, near where the type specimens were collected.

== Distribution and habitat ==
This pultenaea grows in forest near Grafton in north-eastern New South Wales.
