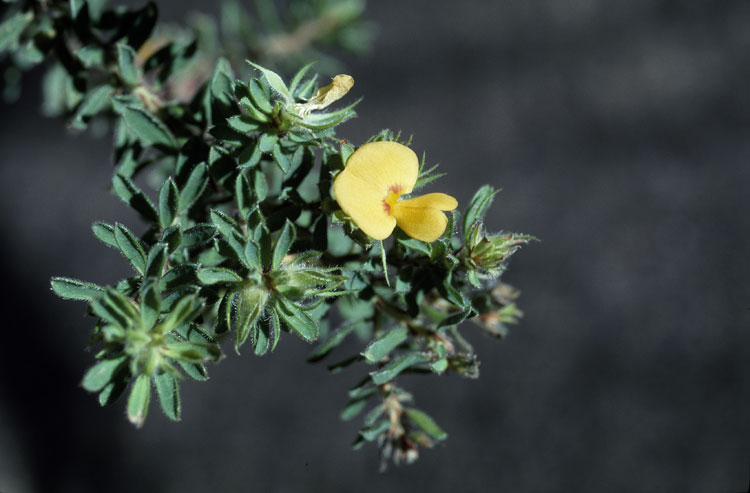

Scientific classification
- Kingdom: Plantae
- Clade: Tracheophytes
- Clade: Angiosperms
- Clade: Eudicots
- Clade: Rosids
- Order: Fabales
- Family: Fabaceae
- Subfamily: Faboideae
- Genus: Pultenaea
- Species: P. rostrata

Binomial name
- Pultenaea rostrata de Kok

= Pultenaea rostrata =

Species of flowering plant

Pultenaea rostrata is a species of flowering plant in the family Fabaceae and is endemic to eastern Australia. It is an erect shrub with elliptic to linear, oblong to club-shaped leaves and yellow to orange and reddish-brown, pea-like flowers.

== Description ==
Pultenaea rostrata is an erect shrub that typically grows to a height of 0.4–2 m (1 ft 4 in – 6 ft 7 in) and has smooth, sparsely hairy branches. The leaves are arranged alternately, elliptic to linear, oblong to club-shaped, mostly 10–12.5 mm (0.39–0.49 in) long and 2.8–3.6 mm (0.11–0.14 in) wide with stipules 3.2–4.2 mm (0.13–0.17 in) long, at the base and pressed against the stem. The flowers are borne among leaves near the ends of the branchlets, and are 8–12 mm (0.31–0.47 in) long, each flower on a pedicel up to about 2 mm (0.079 in) long with linear to egg-shaped bracteoles 4–7 mm (0.16–0.28 in) long on the side of the sepal tube. The sepals are 7–11 mm (0.28–0.43 in) long with tapering tips. Flowering occurs from August to May and the fruit is an inflated pod 5.2 mm (0.20 in) long.

== Taxonomy and naming ==
Pultenaea rostrata was first formally described in 2002 by Rogier Petrus Johannes de Kok in Australian Systematic Botany from specimens collected by Mary Tindale near Angourie in 1973. The specific epithet (rostrata) means "beaked", and refers to the point on the ends of the sepal lobes.

== Distribution and habitat ==
This pultenaea grows in coastal heath and scrub in south-eastern Queensland and north-eastern New South Wales as far south as Coffs Harbour.
