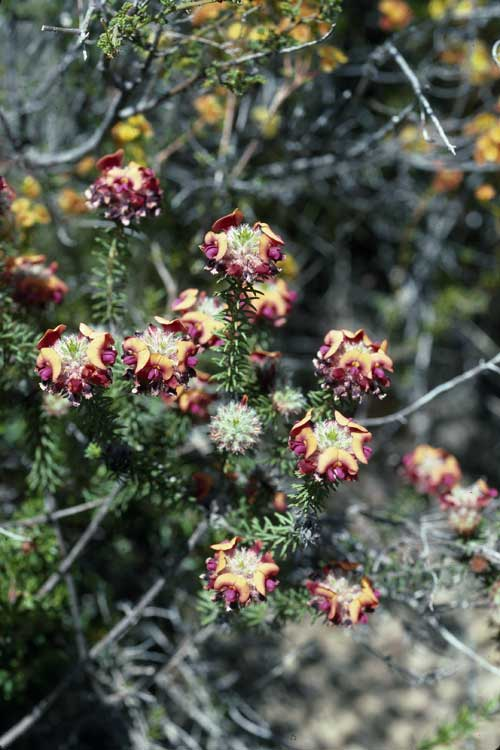
- Near Perth

Scientific classification
- Kingdom: Plantae
- Clade: Tracheophytes
- Clade: Angiosperms
- Clade: Eudicots
- Clade: Rosids
- Order: Fabales
- Family: Fabaceae
- Subfamily: Faboideae
- Genus: Pultenaea
- Species: P. ericifolia

Binomial name
- Pultenaea ericifolia Benth. ex Lindl.

= Pultenaea ericifolia =

Species of flowering plant

Pultenaea ericifolia is a species of flowering plant in the family Fabaceae and is endemic to the south-west of Western Australia. It is an erect or scrambling shrub with down-curved, cylindrical, grooved leaves and yellow to orange and red flowers.

== Description ==
Pultenaea ericifolia is an erect or scrambling shrub that typically grows to a height of 0.3–1.0 m (1 ft 0 in – 3 ft 3 in) and has glabrous stems. The leaves are cylindrical and curved strongly downwards with one or two grooves along the lower surface, 4.5–14 mm (0.18–0.55 in) long and 0.5–1.3 mm (0.020–0.051 in) wide with stipules about 2 mm (0.079 in) long at the base. The flowers are yellow to orange and red, and sessile with hairy sepals 6.0–7.5 mm (0.24–0.30 in) long. There are bracteoles at the base of the sepals. The standard petal yellow to orange with a red base and 9–11 mm (0.35–0.43 in) long, the wings 8.5–9.6 mm (0.33–0.38 in) long and the keel 7–10 mm (0.28–0.39 in) long. Flowering occurs from September to October and the fruit is a pod.

== Taxonomy and naming ==
Pultenaea ericifolia was first formally described in 1839 by John Lindley in A Sketch of the Vegetation of the Swan River Colony from an unpublished description by George Bentham. The specific epithet (ericifolia) means "Erica-leaved".

== Distribution ==
This pultenaea is widespread in the south-west of Western Australia.

== Conservation status ==
Pultenaea ericifolia is classified as "not threatened" by the Government of Western Australia Department of Parks and Wildlife.
