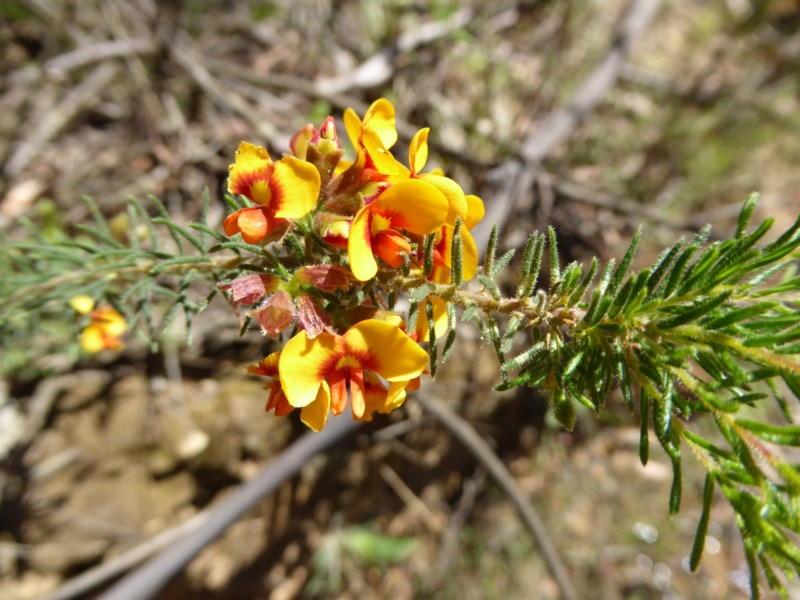
- Near Wee Jasper

Scientific classification
- Kingdom: Plantae
- Clade: Tracheophytes
- Clade: Angiosperms
- Clade: Eudicots
- Clade: Rosids
- Order: Fabales
- Family: Fabaceae
- Subfamily: Faboideae
- Genus: Pultenaea
- Species: P. laxiflora

Binomial name
- Pultenaea laxiflora Benth.

Synonyms
- Pultenaea filifolia F.Muell.; Pultenaea laxiflora Benth. var. laxiflora; Pultenaea laxiflora var. pilosa H.B.Will.; Pultenaea laxiflora var. procumbens F.Muell. ex H.B.Will.; Pultenaea quadricolor J.M.Black

= Pultenaea laxiflora =

Loose-flower bush-pea

Species of flowering plant

Pultenaea laxiflora, commonly known as loose-flower bush-pea, is a species of flowering plant in the family Fabaceae and is endemic to south-eastern continental Australia. It is a low-lying to prostrate, spreading shrub with linear to narrow egg-shaped leaves with the narrower end towards the base, and yellow and red to brown or purple flowers.

== Description ==
Pultenaea laxiflora is a low-lying to prostrate, spreading shrub that typically grows to a height of 0.5–1.1 m (1 ft 8 in – 3 ft 7 in), and has softly-hairy stems when young. The leaves are linear to narrow egg-shaped with the narrower end towards the base, or cylindrical with a groove along the upper surface, 4–12 mm (0.16–0.47 in) long and 0.5–2 mm (0.020–0.079 in) wide with triangular stipules 1–2 mm (0.039–0.079 in) long at the base. The flowers are about 7 mm (0.28 in) long, arranged in leaf axils in groups of up to six, each flower on a hairy peduncle 2–6 mm (0.079–0.236 in) long. There are egg-shaped bracts 2–3 mm (0.079–0.118 in) long but that fall off as the flower opens. The sepals are 5–7 mm (0.20–0.28 in) long with egg-shaped bracteoles 4–5 mm (0.16–0.20 in) long at the base of the sepal tube. The standard and wings are yellow with red markings, the standard 8–9 mm (0.31–0.35 in) with, and the keel is red to brown or purple. Flowering occurs from September to January, mainly in January, and the fruit is an oval, hairy pod 4–5 mm (0.16–0.20 in) long.

== Taxonomy and naming ==
Pultenaea laxiflora was first formally described in 1864 by George Bentham in Flora Australiensis. The specific epithet (laxiflora) means "wide, loose or open-flowered".

== Distribution and habitat ==
Loose-flowered bush-pea grows in forest in New South Wales, the Australian Capital Territory, Victoria and South Australia. It is found on the western slopes of New South Wales and the Australian Capital Territory south from Bathurst, in the drier areas of central and western Victoria to the south-east of South Australia, including Kangaroo Island.
