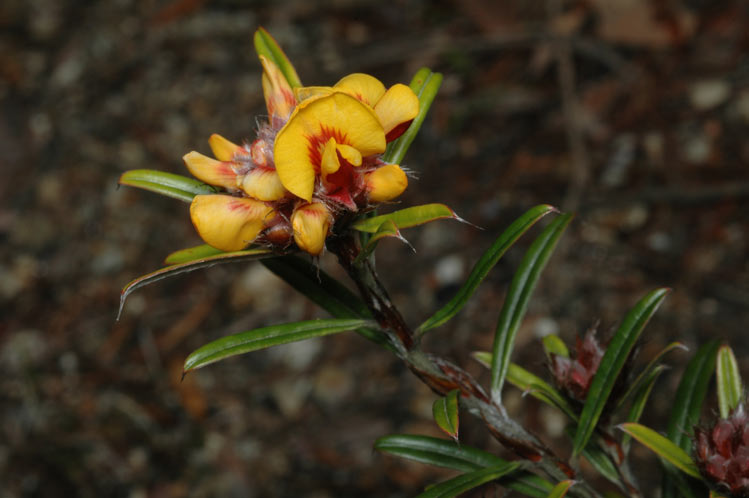

Scientific classification
- Kingdom: Plantae
- Clade: Tracheophytes
- Clade: Angiosperms
- Clade: Eudicots
- Clade: Rosids
- Order: Fabales
- Family: Fabaceae
- Subfamily: Faboideae
- Genus: Pultenaea
- Species: P. borea

Binomial name
- Pultenaea borea de Kok

= Pultenaea borea =

Species of flowering plant

Pultenaea borea is a species of flowering plant in the family Fabaceae and is endemic to Queensland, Australia. It is an erect shrub with elliptic to linear or egg-shaped leaves and yellow to orange and red flowers.

== Description ==
Pultenaea borea is an erect shrub that typically grows to a height of 10–80 cm (3.9–31.5 in) and has densely hairy branches. The leaves are elliptic to linear or egg-shaped with the narrower end towards the base, 9–30 mm (0.35–1.18 in) long and 2–6.6 mm (0.079–0.260 in) wide with stipules 5–11 mm (0.20–0.43 in) long at the base. The upper surface of the leaves is more or less glabrous and the lower surface in densely hairy and grooved. The flowers are arranged in groups with scale-like, reddish bracts. There are boat-shaped bracteoles 5.5–7 mm (0.22–0.28 in) long at the base of the sepals. The sepals are 6–9 mm (0.24–0.35 in) long and densely hairy. The standard petal is yellow to orange and 10–14 mm (0.39–0.55 in) long, the wings yellow to orange and 8–13 mm (0.31–0.51 in) long and the keel is red to purple. Flowering occurs from September to November, and the fruit is an oval pod about 8 mm (0.31 in) long.

== Taxonomy and naming ==
Pultenaea borea was first formally described in 2004 by Rogier Petrus Johannes de Kok in Australian Systematic Botany from specimens collected by Anthony Bean near Eidsvold in 1990. The specific epithet (borea) refers to the northern distribution of this species compared to similar pultenaea species.

== Distribution and habitat ==
This pultenaea grows in the understorey of woodland and forest in south-eastern Queensland.

== Conservation status ==
Pultenaea borea is classed as of "least concern" under the Queensland Government Nature Conservation Act 1992.
