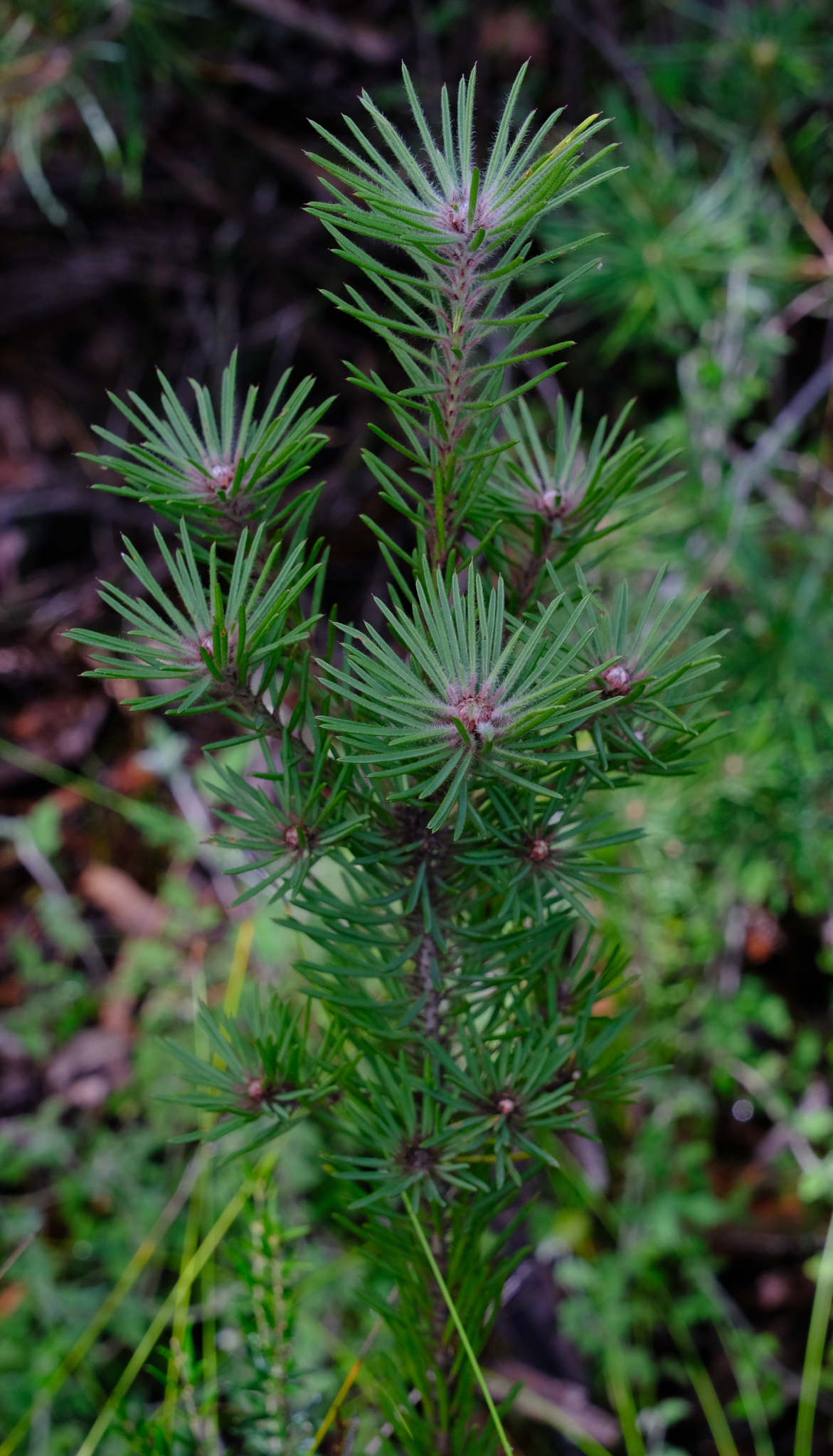

Scientific classification
- Kingdom: Plantae
- Clade: Tracheophytes
- Clade: Angiosperms
- Clade: Eudicots
- Clade: Rosids
- Order: Fabales
- Family: Fabaceae
- Subfamily: Faboideae
- Genus: Pultenaea
- Species: P. rodwayi

Binomial name
- Pultenaea rodwayi Tindale ex de Kok

= Pultenaea rodwayi =

Species of flowering plant

Pultenaea rodwayi is a species of flowering plant in the family Fabaceae and is endemic to south-eastern New South Wales. It is an erect shrub with hairy branchlets, linear leaves, and yellow to orange and red, pea-like flowers.

== Description ==
Pultenaea rodwayi is an erect shrub that typically grows to a height of 1–2 m (3 ft 3 in – 6 ft 7 in) and has hairy branchlets. The leaves are linear with a groove along the upper surface, 15–34 mm (0.59–1.34 in) long and 0.8–1.8 mm (0.031–0.071 in) wide with stipules 1.5–3.0 mm (0.059–0.118 in) long at the base. The flowers are 8–12 mm (0.31–0.47 in) long and arranged in dense clusters on the ends of branches with hairy, three-lobed bracts 2.0–3.5 mm (0.079–0.138 in) long at the base. Each flower is on a pedicel 0.5–1.0 mm (0.020–0.039 in) and there are hairy, linear bracteoles 2–3 mm (0.079–0.118 in) long at the base of the sepal tube, the sepals 5.5–7 mm (0.22–0.28 in) long. The standard petal is yellow to orange with a red base and 10.5–12.5 mm (0.41–0.49 in) long, the standard yellow to orange and 8–10 mm (0.31–0.39 in) long, the wings yellow to orange and 10–11.5 mm (0.39–0.45 in) long and the keel yellow to red and 10–10.5 mm (0.39–0.41 in) long. Flowering occurs from October to November and the fruit is a flattened pod 7–9 mm (0.28–0.35 in) long.

== Taxonomy and naming ==
Pultenaea rodwayi was first formally described in 2003 by Rogier Petrus Johannes de Kok in Australian Systematic Botany from an unpublished description by Mary Tindale.

== Distribution and habitat ==
This pultenaea grows in the shrub understorey of forest and heathland at altitudes between 400 and 800 m (1,300 and 2,600 ft) in the northern Budawang Range in south-eastern New South Wales.
