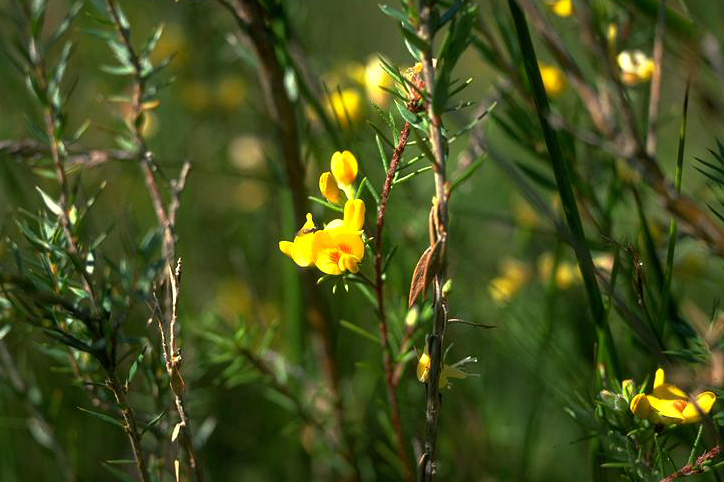

Scientific classification
- Kingdom: Plantae
- Clade: Tracheophytes
- Clade: Angiosperms
- Clade: Eudicots
- Clade: Rosids
- Order: Fabales
- Family: Fabaceae
- Subfamily: Faboideae
- Genus: Pultenaea
- Species: P. divaricata

Binomial name
- Pultenaea divaricata H.B.Will.

= Pultenaea divaricata =

Species of flowering plant

Pultenaea divaricata is a species of flowering plant in the family Fabaceae and is endemic to a small area of New South Wales. It is an erect shrub with linear, needle-shaped, grooved leaves, and dense clusters of yellow to orange flowers with red markings.

== Description ==
Pultenaea divaricata is an erect shrub that typically grows to a height of up to 1 m (3 ft 3 in) and has stems that are more or less glabrous. The leaves are arranged alternately, linear to needle-shaped, 5–12 mm (0.20–0.47 in) long and about 0.5 mm (0.020 in) wide with a groove along the upper surface. The leaves are densely covered with small pimples and there are stipules about 2.5 mm (0.098 in) long at the base. The flowers are arranged in dense clusters of on the ends of branchlets with bracts about 2.5 mm (0.098 in) long. The flowers are 5–10 mm (0.20–0.39 in) long and sessile or on pedicels up to 0.5 mm (0.020 in) long with oblong bracteoles about 2 mm (0.079 in) long attached to the sepal tube. The sepals are 2–5 mm (0.079–0.197 in) long, the standard petal and wings are yellow to orange with red markings and the keel is yellow. The ovary is hairy and the fruit is a flattened pod about 5 mm (0.20 in) long.

== Taxonomy and naming ==
Pultenaea divaricata was first formally described in 1921 by Herbert Bennett Williamson in the Proceedings of the Royal Society of Victoria. The specific epithet (divaricata) means "spreading widely".

== Distribution and habitat ==
This pultenaea grows in swampy heath on the coast and tablelands of New South Wales from the Blue Mountains to Corang.
