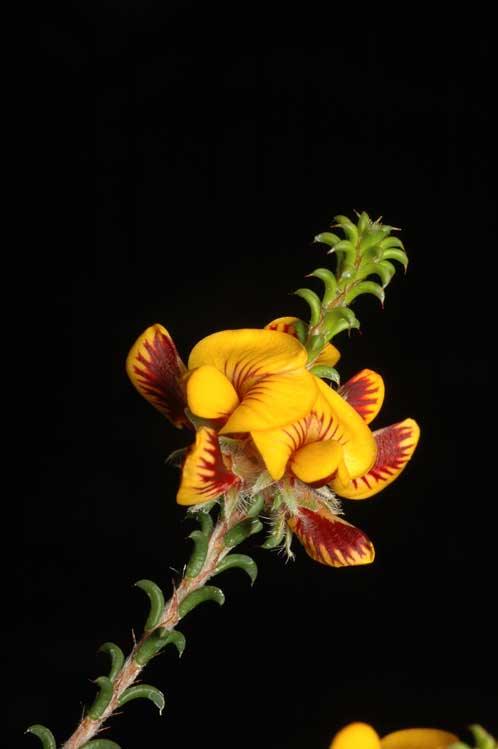
- In the Australian National Botanic Gardens

Scientific classification
- Kingdom: Plantae
- Clade: Tracheophytes
- Clade: Angiosperms
- Clade: Eudicots
- Clade: Rosids
- Order: Fabales
- Family: Fabaceae
- Subfamily: Faboideae
- Genus: Pultenaea
- Species: P. empetrifolia

Binomial name
- Pultenaea empetrifolia Meisn.

Synonyms
- Pultenaea verticillata Turcz.

= Pultenaea empetrifolia =

Species of flowering plant

Pultenaea empetrifolia is a species of flowering plant in the family Fabaceae and is endemic to the south-west of Western Australia. It is a spindly, prostrate or spreading shrub with down-curved, cylindrical, grooved leaves and yellow to orange and red flowers.

== Description ==
Pultenaea empetrifolia is a spindly, prostrate or spreading shrub that typically grows to a height of up to 40 cm (16 in) and has glabrous stems. The leaves are cylindrical and curved strongly downwards with one or two grooves along the lower surface, 3–4.5 mm (0.12–0.18 in) long and 0.6–1.0 mm (0.024–0.039 in) wide with stipules at the base. The flowers are yellow to orange and red, and sessile or on a pedicel about up to 0.5 mm (0.020 in) long. The sepals are hairy and 4.0–4.6 mm (0.16–0.18 in) long with hairy bracteoles 1.5–3 mm (0.059–0.118 in) long at the base. The standard petal is 8.0–8.5 mm (0.31–0.33 in) long, the wings 7–8 mm (0.28–0.31 in) long and the keel 6.2–7.0 mm (0.24–0.28 in) long. Flowering occurs from September to October and the fruit is a pod.

== Taxonomy and naming ==
Pultenaea empetrifolia was first formally described in 1844 by Carl Meissner in Lehmann's Plantae Preissianae. The specific epithet (empetrifolia) means "Empetrum-leaved".

== Distribution ==
This pultenaea is widespread in the Avon Wheatbelt, Esperance Plains, Jarrah Forest and Mallee biogeographic regions of south-western Western Australia.

== Conservation status ==
Pultenaea empetrifolia is classified as "not threatened" by the Government of Western Australia Department of Parks and Wildlife.
