= Pultenaea spinulosa =

Scientific classification
- Kingdom: Plantae
- Clade: Tracheophytes
- Clade: Angiosperms
- Clade: Eudicots
- Clade: Rosids
- Order: Fabales
- Family: Fabaceae
- Subfamily: Faboideae
- Genus: Pultenaea
- Species: P. spinulosa

Binomial name
- Pultenaea spinulosa (Turcz.) Benth.

Synonyms
- Euchilus spinulosus Turcz.; Pultenaea sp. Wittenoom Hills (M.A.Burgman 2564)

Species of flowering plant

Pultenaea spinulosa is a species of flowering plant in the family Fabaceae and is endemic to the south of Western Australia. It is a shrub with flat, hairy leaves, and uniformly yellow flowers.

== Description ==
Pultenaea spinulosa is a shrub that typically grows to a height of 15–40 cm (5.9–15.7 in) and has hairy stems. The leaves are flat, 7–8 mm (0.28–0.31 in) long and 2.0–2.5 mm (0.079–0.098 in) wide with stipules at the base. The flowers are uniformly yellow, each flower on a hairy pedicel 2.0–2.5 mm (0.079–0.098 in) long with hairy bracteoles 4.0–4.6 mm (0.16–0.18 in) long attached to the pedicel. The sepals are hairy, 6.5–7.6 mm (0.26–0.30 in) long, the standard petal 7–8 mm (0.28–0.31 in) long, the wings 5.4–6.2 mm (0.21–0.24 in) long and the keel 5.0–6.5 mm (0.20–0.26 in) long. Flowering occurs from September to October and the fruit is a flattened pod.

== Taxonomy and naming ==
This species was first formally described in 1853 by Nikolai Turczaninow who gave it the name Euchilus spinulosus in the Bulletin de la Société impériale des naturalistes de Moscou from specimens collected by James Drummond. In 1864, George Bentham changed the name to Pultenaea spinulosa in Flora Australiensis. The specific epithet (spinulosa) means "spiny", referring to the tips of the leaves.

== Distribution ==
This pultenaea grows on flats in the Esperance Plains and Mallee biogeographic regions in the south of Western Australia.

== Conservation status ==
Pultenaea spinulosa is classified as "not threatened" by the Government of Western Australia Department of Biodiversity, Conservation and Attractions.
