= Pultenaea aspalathoides =

Scientific classification
- Kingdom: Plantae
- Clade: Tracheophytes
- Clade: Angiosperms
- Clade: Eudicots
- Clade: Rosids
- Order: Fabales
- Family: Fabaceae
- Subfamily: Faboideae
- Genus: Pultenaea
- Species: P. aspalathoides

Binomial name
- Pultenaea aspalathoides Meisn.

Species of flowering plant

Pultenaea aspalathoides is a species of flowering plant in the family Fabaceae and is endemic to the south of Western Australia. It is an erect, spindly shrub with hairy, needle-shaped leaves and yellow flowers.

== Description ==
Pultenaea aspalathoides is an erect, spindly shrub that typically grows to a height of 0.5–1.5 m (1 ft 8 in – 4 ft 11 in). The leaves are needle-shaped, 8–15 mm (0.31–0.59 in) long and 0.8–1.5 mm (0.031–0.059 in) wide and hairy with stipules at the base. The flowers are uniformly yellow and sessile with hairy bracteoles at the base. The sepals are 5–8 mm (0.20–0.31 in) long and hairy, the standard petal 10–13.5 mm (0.39–0.53 in) long and glabrous. The wings are 9–12.5 mm (0.35–0.49 in) long and the keel 8–11 mm (0.31–0.43 in) long. Flowering occurs from September to December and the fruit is an oval pod.

== Taxonomy and naming ==
Pultenaea aspalathoides was first formally described in 1844 by Carl Meissner in Lehmann's Plantae Preissianae. The specific epithet (aspalathoides) means "like Aspalathus".

== Distribution ==
This pultenaea grows in the south of Western Australia in the Esperance Plains, Jarrah Forest and Warren biogeographic regions.

== Conservation status ==
Pultenaea aspalathoides is classified as "not threatened" by the Government of Western Australia Department of Parks and Wildlife,
