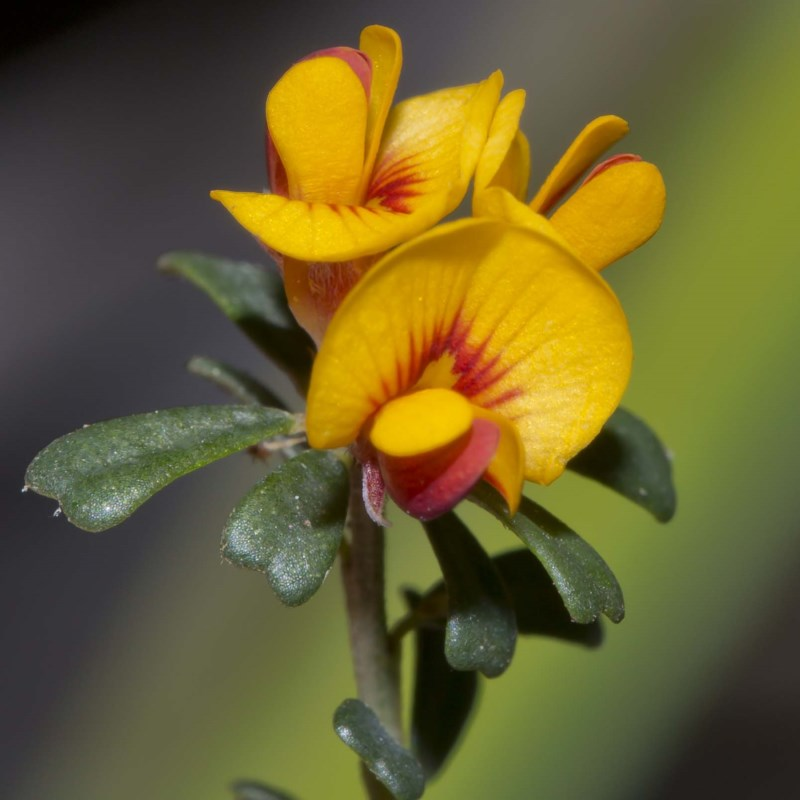
- Pultenaea retusa near Tura Beach

Scientific classification
- Kingdom: Plantae
- Clade: Tracheophytes
- Clade: Angiosperms
- Clade: Eudicots
- Clade: Rosids
- Order: Fabales
- Family: Fabaceae
- Subfamily: Faboideae
- Genus: Pultenaea
- Species: P. retusa

Binomial name
- Pultenaea retusa Sm.

Synonyms
- Pultenaea aff. retusa (Mt Kaye); Pultenaea retusa Sm. isonym; Pultenaea retusa Willd. nom. illeg.; Pultenaea retusa Sm. var. retusa

= Pultenaea retusa =

Notched bush-pea

Species of legume

Pultenaea retusa, commonly known as notched bush-pea, is a species of flowering plant in the family Fabaceae and is endemic to eastern continental Australia. It is an erect shrub with wedge-shaped or egg-shaped leaves with the narrower end towards the base, and yellow to orange and red to purple flowers.

== Description ==
Pultenaea retusa is an erect shrub that typically grows to a height of 0.5–2.0 m (1 ft 8 in – 6 ft 7 in) and has hairy stems when young. The leaves are arranged alternately along the stems, wedge-shaped to egg-shaped with the narrower end towards the base, 5–15 mm (0.20–0.59 in) long, 2–5 mm (0.079–0.197 in) wide with stipules about 1 mm (0.039 in) long at the base and often with a notch at the tip. The flowers are arranged in dense clusters on the ends of branches and are 5–7 mm (0.20–0.28 in) long, each flower on a pedicel up to 2 mm (0.079 in) long with overlapping bracts 2–5 mm (0.079–0.197 in) long, but that fall off as the flowers open. The sepals are 3–4 mm (0.12–0.16 in) long, joined at the base, and there are narrow egg-shaped bracteoles 2–4 mm (0.079–0.157 in) long attached to the side of the sepal tube. The standard petal is yellow to orange with red markings and 4–6 mm (0.16–0.24 in) wide, the wings are yellow to orange and the keel is red to purple. Flowering occurs from September to November and the fruit is a hairy, flattened pod 5–7 mm (0.20–0.28 in) long.

== Taxonomy ==
Pultenaea retusa was first formally described in 1805 by James Edward Smith in the Annals of Botany. The specific epithet (retusa) refers to the leaves, that often have a notch at the end.

== Distribution and habitat ==
Notched bush-pea grows in forest and heathland on swampy sites on the coast and nearby tablelands of Queensland, New South Wales, and Victoria as far west as Melbourne.
