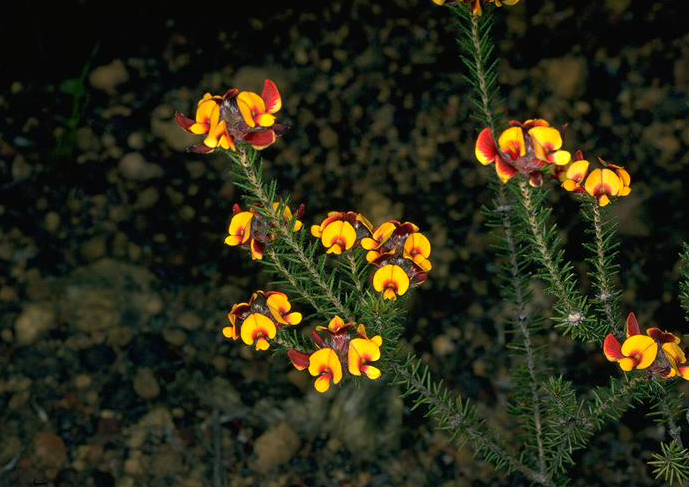

Scientific classification
- Kingdom: Plantae
- Clade: Tracheophytes
- Clade: Angiosperms
- Clade: Eudicots
- Clade: Rosids
- Order: Fabales
- Family: Fabaceae
- Subfamily: Faboideae
- Genus: Pultenaea
- Species: P. verruculosa

Binomial name
- Pultenaea verruculosa Turcz.

Synonyms
- Pultenaea verruculosa var. pilosa Benth.; Pultenaea verruculosa Turcz. var. verruculosa

= Pultenaea verruculosa =

Species of flowering plant

Pultenaea verruculosa is a species of flowering plant in the family Fabaceae and is endemic to the south-west of Western Australia. It is an erect shrub with flat, hairy leaves, and yellow-orange and red, pea-like flowers.

== Description ==
Pultenaea verruculosa is an erect shrub that typically grows to a height of 20–50 cm (7.9–19.7 in) and has hairy stems. The leaves are flat, 5–12 mm (0.20–0.47 in) long and 0.7–1 mm (0.028–0.039 in) wide with stipules 1.8–2.0 mm (0.071–0.079 in) long at the base. The flowers are yellow-orange with red markings, each flower on a hairy pedicel up to 1 mm (0.039 in) long with hairy bracteoles 5.0–5.6 mm (0.20–0.22 in) long attached to the pedicel. The sepals are hairy, 6–7 mm (0.24–0.28 in) long, the standard petal 13–15 mm (0.51–0.59 in) long, the wings 11–14 mm (0.43–0.55 in) long and the keel 9.6–11.5 mm (0.38–0.45 in) long. Flowering occurs from September to November and the fruit is a flattened pod.

== Taxonomy and naming ==
Pultenaea verruculosa was first formally described in 1853 by Nikolai Turczaninow in the Bulletin de la Société impériale des naturalistes de Moscou from specimens collected by James Drummond. The specific epithet (verruculosa) means "somewhat covered with warts", referring to the leaves.

== Distribution ==
This pultenaea grows on sandplains in the Avon Wheatbelt, Esperance Plains, Jarrah Forest, Mallee, Swan Coastal Plain and Warren biogeographic regions in the south of Western Australia.

== Conservation status ==
Pultenaea verruculosa is classified as "not threatened" by the Government of Western Australia Department of Biodiversity, Conservation and Attractions.
