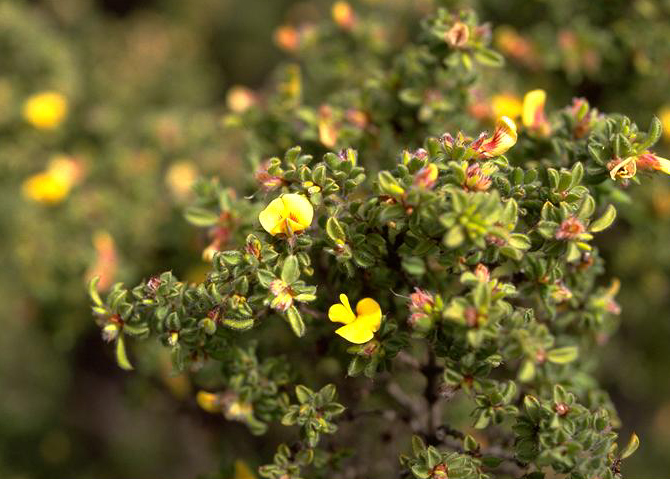

Scientific classification
- Kingdom: Plantae
- Clade: Tracheophytes
- Clade: Angiosperms
- Clade: Eudicots
- Clade: Rosids
- Order: Fabales
- Family: Fabaceae
- Subfamily: Faboideae
- Genus: Pultenaea
- Species: P. trifida

Binomial name
- Pultenaea trifida J.M.Black

= Pultenaea trifida =

Kangaroo Island bush-pea

Species of plant

Pultenaea trifida, commonly known as Kangaroo Island bush-pea, is a species of flowering plant in the family Fabaceae and is endemic to Kangaroo Island in South Australia. It is an erect to prostrate shrub with hairy branches, egg-shaped to more or less round leaves, and relatively few yellow to orange and red, pea-like flowers.

== Description ==
Pultenaea trifida is an erect to prostrate shrub that typically grows to a height of 0.4–1 m (1 ft 4 in – 3 ft 3 in) and has moderately hairy branches. The leaves are arranged alternately, and are egg-shaped to more or less round, 1.8–8.2 mm (0.071–0.323 in) long, 0.9–2.7 mm (0.035–0.106 in) wide with lance-shaped stipules 2.1–2.2 mm (0.083–0.087 in) long at the base. The flowers are relatively few in number and arranged singly or in small groups near the ends of short side shoots. They are about 7 mm (0.28 in) long and more or less sessile with several egg-shaped bracts at the base. The sepals are 4.0–4.5 mm (0.16–0.18 in) long with three-forked bracteoles about 4.5 mm (0.18 in) long below the base of the sepal tube. The standard petal is yellow-orange with red striations and 6–7 mm (0.24–0.28 in) long, the wings yellow to orange and 5.2–6.0 mm (0.20–0.24 in) long, and the keel yellow with a red tip and 5.5–6.0 mm (0.22–0.24 in) long. Flowering mainly occurs from September to November and the fruit is an egg-shaped, brown pod about 4.5 mm (0.18 in) long.

== Taxonomy ==
Pultenaea trifida was first formally described in 1909 by John McConnell Black in the Transactions, proceedings and report, Royal Society of South Australia from specimens collected in 1908. The specific epithet (trifida) means "three-forked".

== Distribution and habitat ==
Kangaroo Island bush-pea is common in heath and mallee on Kangaroo Island.
