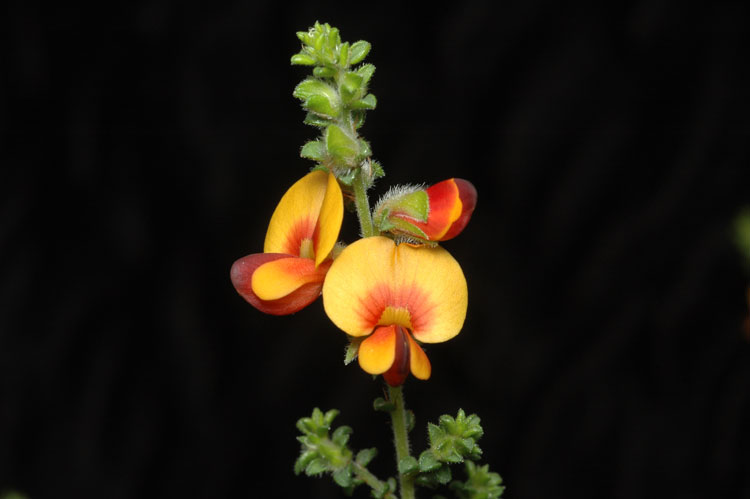
- Pultenaea foliolosa in the ANBG

Scientific classification
- Kingdom: Plantae
- Clade: Tracheophytes
- Clade: Angiosperms
- Clade: Eudicots
- Clade: Rosids
- Order: Fabales
- Family: Fabaceae
- Subfamily: Faboideae
- Genus: Pultenaea
- Species: P. foliolosa

Binomial name
- Pultenaea foliolosa A.Cunn. ex Benth.

= Pultenaea foliolosa =

Small-leaf bush-pea

Species of legume

Pultenaea foliolosa, commonly known as the small-leaf bush-pea, is a species of flowering plant in the family Fabaceae and is endemic to eastern Australia. It is an erect to low-lying shrub with elliptic to oblong leaves that are concave on the upper surface, and yellow to orange and reddish-brown flowers.

== Description ==
Pultenaea foliolosa is an erect to low-lying or sprawling shrub that typically grows to a height of 1–2 m (3 ft 3 in – 6 ft 7 in) and with softly-hairy stems. The leaves are elliptic to oblong, concave on the upper surface, 1–3 mm (0.039–0.118 in) long and 1–2 mm (0.039–0.079 in) wide with lance-shaped stipules 1–2 mm (0.039–0.079 in) long at the base. The flowers are arranged singly in leaf axils on short side-shoots and are 7–10 mm (0.28–0.39 in) long, each flower on a pedicel 1.5–3 mm (0.059–0.118 in) long. The sepals are 4–5 mm (0.16–0.20 in) long with egg-shaped to lance-shaped, papery bracteoles 2–5 mm (0.079–0.197 in) long attached to the side of the sepal tube. The standard petal is yellow to orange and 6–10 mm (0.24–0.39 in) long, the wings yellow to orange and the keel reddish-brown. Flowering occurs from October to November and the fruit is an egg-shaped pod about 5 mm (0.20 in) long.

== Taxonomy ==
Pultenaea foliolosa was first formally described in 1837 by George Bentham from an unpublished description by Allan Cunningham. Bentham's description was published in his book Commentationes de Leguminosarum Generibus.

== Distribution and habitat ==
Small-leaf bush-pea grows in forest and woodland on the tablelands of south-eastern Queensland, New South Wales and north-eastern Victoria.
