= Pultenaea arida =

Scientific classification
- Kingdom: Plantae
- Clade: Tracheophytes
- Clade: Angiosperms
- Clade: Eudicots
- Clade: Rosids
- Order: Fabales
- Family: Fabaceae
- Subfamily: Faboideae
- Genus: Pultenaea
- Species: P. arida

Binomial name
- Pultenaea arida E.Pritz.

Species of flowering plant

Pultenaea arida is a species of flowering plant in the family Fabaceae and is endemic to the south of Western Australia. It is a low, spindly, spreading shrub with small, flat, hairy leaves and yellow, red or orange flowers.

== Description ==
Pultenaea arida is a spindly, prostrate or spreading shrub that typically grows to a height of 10–30 cm (3.9–11.8 in) with hairy stems. The leaves are flat, 4–6.5 mm (0.16–0.26 in) long and about 3 mm (0.12 in) wide and hairy with stipules 1.5–2.5 mm (0.059–0.098 in) long at the base. The flowers are yellow, red or orange with spots and blotches of yellow, red or orange. Each flower is borne on a pedicel 1–4.5 mm (0.039–0.177 in) long with hairy bracteoles 1–1.5 mm (0.039–0.059 in) long at the base. The sepals are 5–6.5 mm (0.20–0.26 in) long and hairy. The standard petal and wings are 5–6.5 mm (0.20–0.26 in) long and the keel 5–7 mm (0.20–0.28 in) long. Flowering occurs from September to December and the fruit is an oval pod.

== Taxonomy and naming ==
Pultenaea arida was first formally described in 1904 by Ernst Georg Pritzel in the Botanische Jahrbücher für Systematik, Pflanzengeschichte und Pflanzengeographie. The specific epithet (arida) means "arid or dry".

== Distribution and habitat ==
This pultenaea grows on flats in sandy or clay soils in the Coolgardie and Mallee biogeographic regions in the south of Western Australia.

== Conservation status ==
Pultenaea arida is classified as "not threatened" by the Government of Western Australia Department of Parks and Wildlife.
