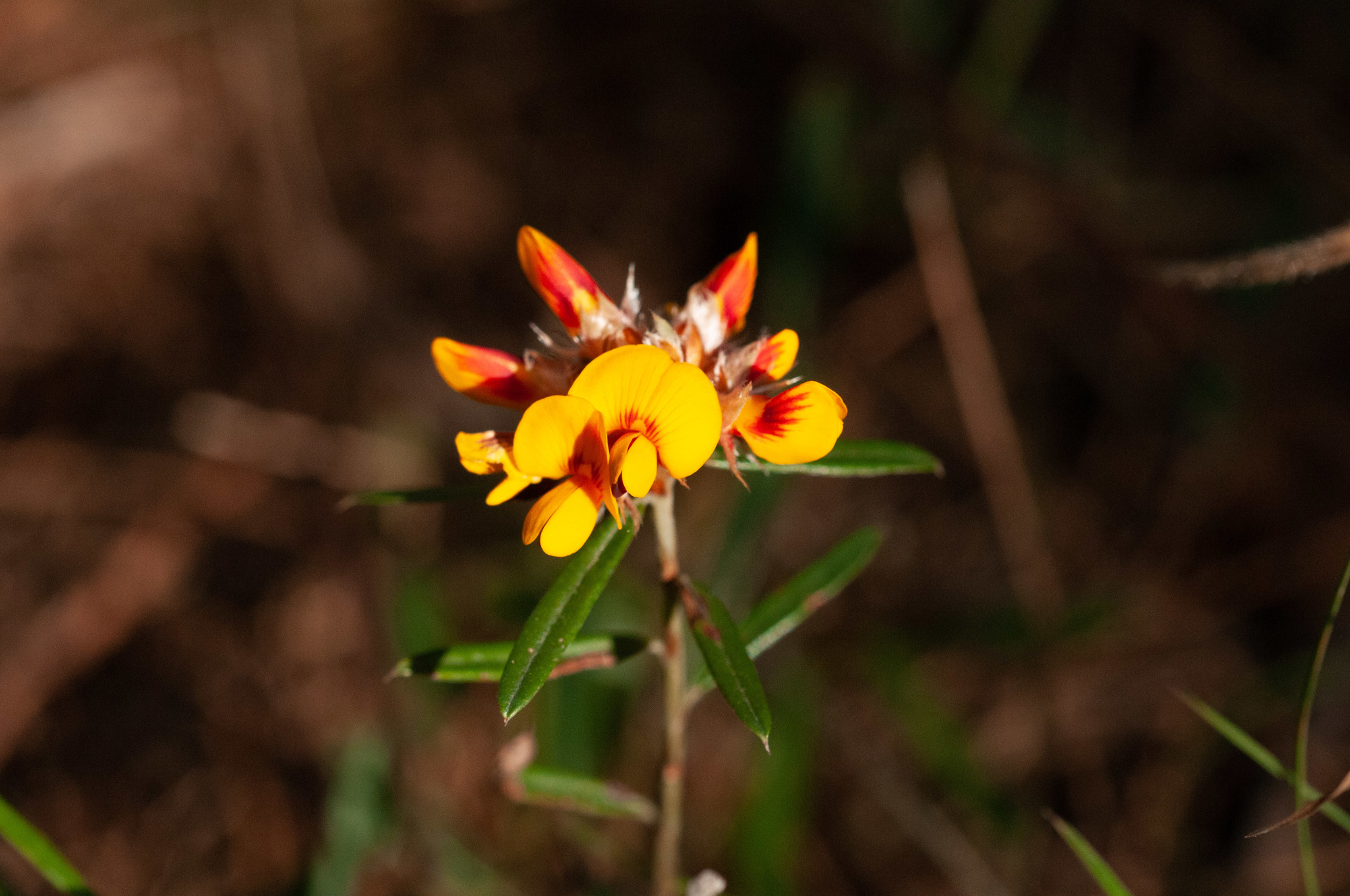
- In a Brisbane nature reserve

Scientific classification
- Kingdom: Plantae
- Clade: Tracheophytes
- Clade: Angiosperms
- Clade: Eudicots
- Clade: Rosids
- Order: Fabales
- Family: Fabaceae
- Subfamily: Faboideae
- Genus: Pultenaea
- Species: P. paleacea

Binomial name
- Pultenaea paleacea Willd.

= Pultenaea paleacea =

Chaffy bush-pea

Species of legume

Pultenaea paleacea, commonly known as chaffy bush-pea, is a species of flowering plant in the family Fabaceae and is endemic to eastern Australia. It is a prostrate to spreading shrub with linear to lance-shaped leaves with the narrower end towards the base, and yellow to orange and red to purple flowers.

== Description ==
Pultenaea paleacea is a prostrate to spreading shrub with stems that have soft hairs pressed against the surface. The leaves are arranged alternately, linear to lance-shaped with the narrower end towards the base, 9–19 mm (0.35–0.75 in) long and 1–2 mm (0.039–0.079 in) wide, with stipules 3–11 mm (0.12–0.43 in) long at the base. The edges of the leaves are mostly rolled under and the lower surface is paler than the upper surface. The flowers are arranged in dense clusters on the ends of branches and are 9–19 mm (0.35–0.75 in) long and sessile with two- or three-lobed, egg-shaped bracts 5–10 mm (0.20–0.39 in) long at the base. The sepals are 4–7 mm (0.16–0.28 in) long and densely hairy with oblong bracteoles 3–5 mm (0.12–0.20 in) long attached near the base of the sepal tube. The standard petal and wings are yellow to orange with red markings and the keel is red to purple. The fruit is a hairy pod.

== Taxonomy ==
Pultenaea paleacea was first formally described in 1799 by Carl Ludwig Willdenow in the fourth edition of Species Plantarum. The specific epithet (paleacea) means "chaff-like".

== Distribution and habitat ==
This pultenaea grows in heath, woodland, forest and swamps in near-coastal areas from south-east Queensland to Ulladulla in New South Wales.
