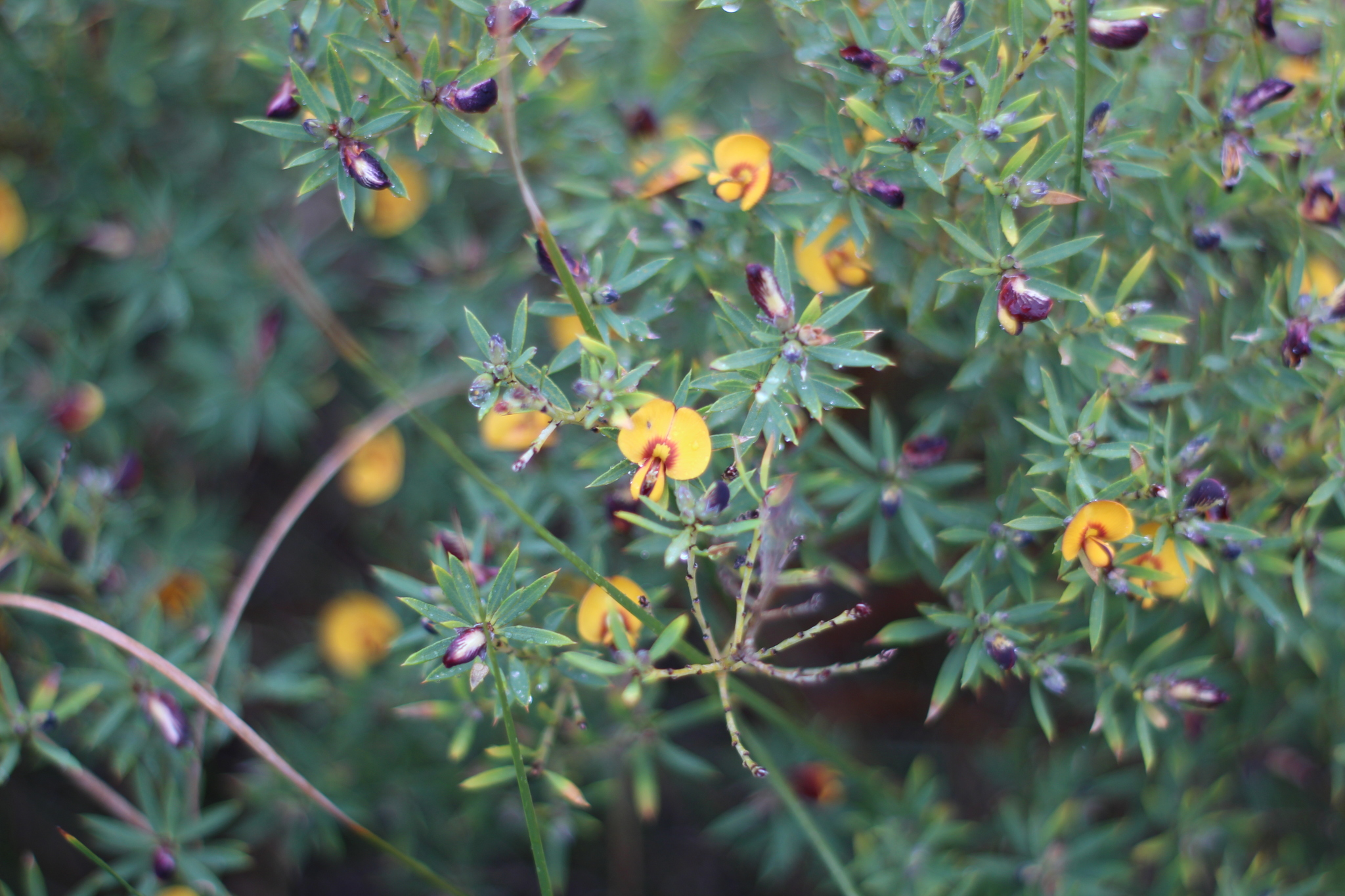

Scientific classification
- Kingdom: Plantae
- Clade: Tracheophytes
- Clade: Angiosperms
- Clade: Eudicots
- Clade: Rosids
- Order: Fabales
- Family: Fabaceae
- Subfamily: Faboideae
- Genus: Pultenaea
- Species: P. reticulata

Binomial name
- Pultenaea reticulata (Sm.) Benth.

Synonyms
- Daviesia reticulata Sm. isonym; Daviesia reticulata Sm.; Jacksonia reticulata (Sm.) DC.; Pultenaea aciphylla Benth. isonym; Pultenaea aciphylla Benth.; Pultenaea aciphylla Benth. var. aciphylla; Pultenaea aciphylla β latifolia Meisn.

= Pultenaea reticulata =

Species of flowering plant

Pultenaea reticulata is a species of flowering plant in the family Fabaceae and is endemic to the far south-west of Western Australia. It is an erect, open shrub with flat, elliptic leaves, and yellow-orange and reddish-brown flowers.

== Description ==
Pultenaea reticulata is an erect shrub that typically grows to a height of 0.5–2 m (1 ft 8 in – 6 ft 7 in) and has hairy stems. The leaves are arranged alternately along the branches, flat, elliptic, 8–25 mm (0.31–0.98 in) long and 3–9 mm (0.12–0.35 in) wide with stipules at the base and a sharp point on the tip. The flowers are yellow-orange and reddish-brown and sessile with bracteoles attached to the pedicel. The sepals are 7.5–9 mm (0.30–0.35 in) long, the standard petal 11.5–13.5 mm (0.45–0.53 in) long, the wings 10–11.5 mm (0.39–0.45 in) long and the keel 10.0–10.5 mm (0.39–0.41 in) long. Flowering occurs from August to December and the fruit is a flattened pod.

== Taxonomy and naming ==
This species was first formally described in 1808 by James Edward Smith who gave it the name Daviesia reticulata in The Cyclopedia. In 1864, George Bentham changed the name to Pultenaea reticulata in Flora Australiensis. The specific epithet (reticulata) refers to the veins in the leaves.

== Distribution ==
This pultenaea is usually found winter-wet places in the Esperance Plains, Jarrah Forest, Swan Coastal Plain and Warren biogeographic regions of south-western Western Australia.

== Conservation status ==
Pultenaea rdiata is classified as "not threatened" by the Government of Western Australia Department of Parks and Wildlife.
