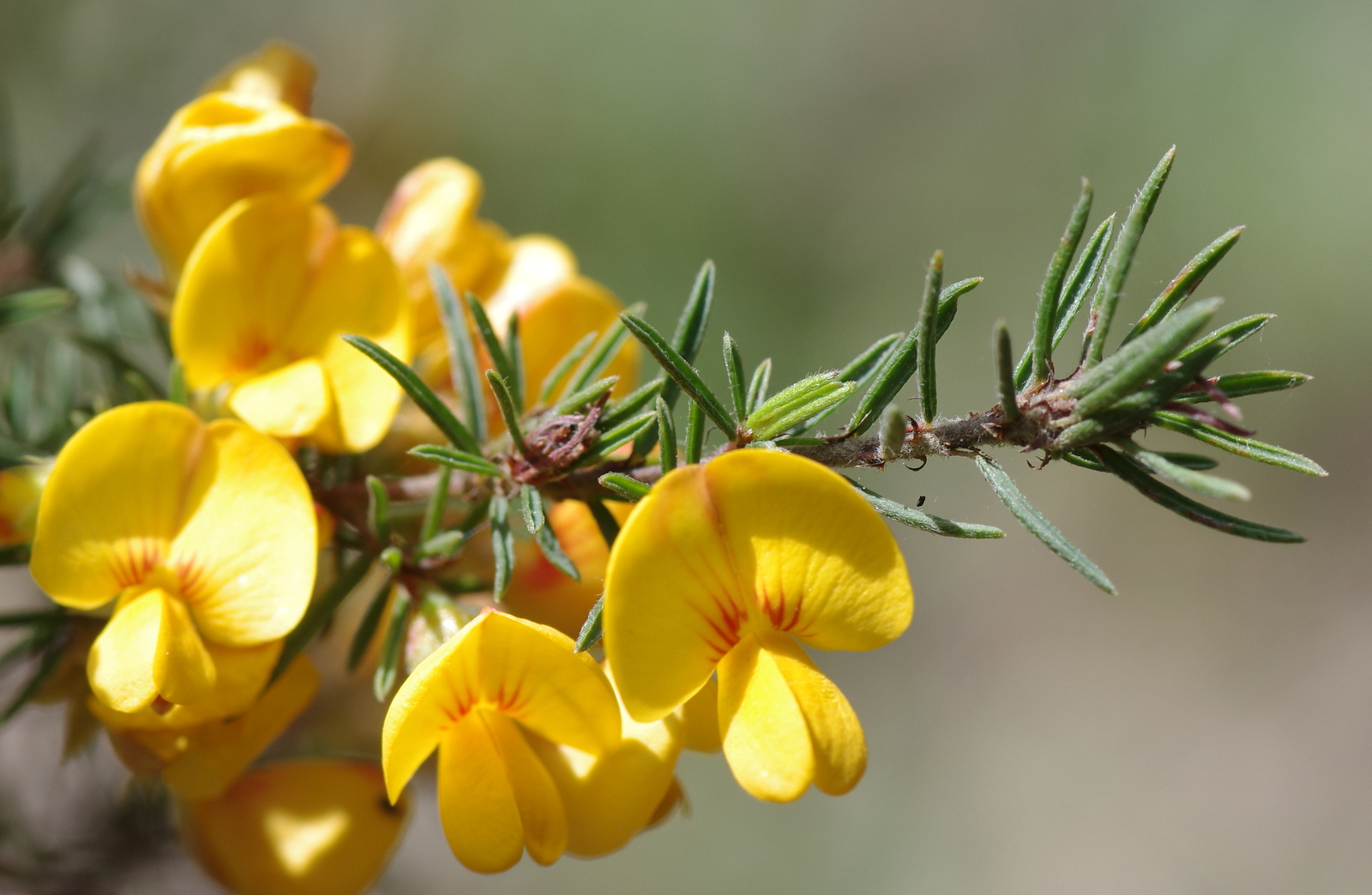

Scientific classification
- Kingdom: Plantae
- Clade: Embryophytes
- Clade: Tracheophytes
- Clade: Spermatophytes
- Clade: Angiosperms
- Clade: Eudicots
- Clade: Rosids
- Order: Fabales
- Family: Fabaceae
- Subfamily: Faboideae
- Genus: Pultenaea
- Species: P. mollis

Binomial name
- Pultenaea mollis Lindl.

Synonyms
- Pultenaea angustifolia F.Muell. ex H.B.Will.; Pultenaea angustifolia F.Muell. ex H.B.Will. var. angustifolia; Pultenaea hibbertioides Hook.f.; Pultenaea hibbertioides var. conferta Benth.; Pultenaea hibbertioides Hook.f. var. hibbertioides; Pultenaea hibbertioides var. prostrata H.B.Will.; Pultenaea mollis Lindl. var. mollis

= Pultenaea mollis =

Soft bush-pea

Species of legume

Pultenaea mollis, commonly known as soft bush-pea or guinea flower bush pea, is a species of flowering plant in the family Fabaceae and is endemic to south-eastern Australia. It is an erect or spreading shrub with narrow linear to elliptic or needle-shaped leaves and clusters of up to ten yellow to orange flowers with red markings.

== Description ==
Pultenaea mollis is an erect or spreading shrub that typically grows to a height of up to 3 m (9.8 ft) with stems covered with twisted or curled hairs. The leaves are arranged alternately, narrow linear to elliptic or needle-shaped, 10–20 mm (0.39–0.79 in) long and 0.3–1.2 mm (0.012–0.047 in) wide with the edges rolled inwards and the lower surface hairy. There are stipules 2–3 mm (0.079–0.118 in) long with their eges rolled under, at the base of the leaves. The flowers are arranged in leafy clusters of four to ten near the ends of short side branches, each flower 7–9 mm (0.28–0.35 in) long on pedicels 1.5–4 mm (0.059–0.157 in) long with bracts up to 5 mm (0.20 in) long. The sepals are 4–8 mm (0.16–0.31 in) long with egg-shaped bracteoles 2–8 mm (0.079–0.315 in) long attached at the base of the sepal tube. The standard petal and wings are yellow with red markings and the keel is red. Flowering occurs from spring to summer and the fruit is an egg-shaped pod 5–6 mm (0.20–0.24 in) long.

== Taxonomy ==
Pultenaea mollis was first formally described in 1838 by John Lindley in Thomas Mitchell's journal, Three Expeditions into the interior of Eastern Australia. The specific epithet (mollis) means "soft".

== Distribution and habitat ==
Soft bush-pea grows in forest, sometimes in heathland, and occurs in coastal areas south from Gosford in New South Wales to the southern half of Victoria where it is widespread and locally common. The species also occurs in the north-east of Tasmania.

== Conservation status ==
Pultenaea mollis is classified as "vulnerable" under the Tasmanian Government Threatened Species Protection Act 1995.
