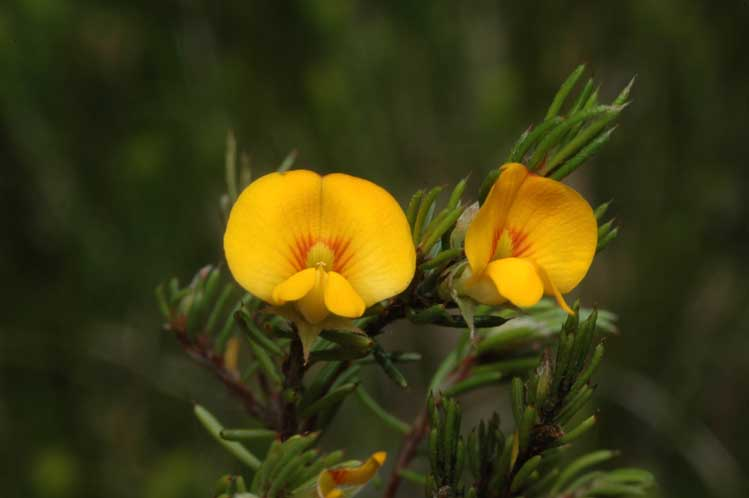
- Pultenaea fasciculata at Barrington Tops

Scientific classification
- Kingdom: Plantae
- Clade: Tracheophytes
- Clade: Angiosperms
- Clade: Eudicots
- Clade: Rosids
- Order: Fabales
- Family: Fabaceae
- Subfamily: Faboideae
- Genus: Pultenaea
- Species: P. fasciculata

Binomial name
- Pultenaea fasciculata Benth.

= Pultenaea fasciculata =

Alpine bush-pea

Species of flowering plant

Pultenaea fasciculata, commonly known as alpine bush-pea or bundled bush-pea is a species of flowering plant in the family Fabaceae and is endemic to south-eastern Australia. It is a small prostrate or low-lying shrub with cylindrical leaves and yellow to orange-coloured flowers arranged singly or in small groups near the ends of branchlets.

== Description ==
Pultenaea fasciculata is a small prostrate or low-lying shrub with linear to more or less cylindrical leaves 3–10 mm (0.12–0.39 in) long and about 0.5 mm (0.020 in) wide with groove along the upper surface, a hooked tip and stipules about 2 mm (0.079 in) long at the base. The flowers are arranged singly in up to three leaf axils near the ends of branchlets and are 5–8 mm (0.20–0.31 in) long. There are bracts or stipules up to 2 mm (0.079 in) long at the base. The sepals are 4–6 mm (0.16–0.24 in) long and hairy, and the petals are yellow to orange with red striations. Flowering occurs from December to February and the fruit is an egg-shaped pod about 5 mm (0.20 in) long.

== Taxonomy and naming ==
Pultenaea fasciculata was first formally described in 1837 by George Bentham in his Commentationes de Leguminosarum Generibus. The specific epithet (fasciculata) means "clustered", referring to the leaves.

== Distribution and habitat ==
Alpine bush-pea grows in alpine or sub-alpine grassland in New South Wales, south from Barrington Tops, in north-eastern Victoria and on the Central Plateau in Tasmania.
