= Pultenaea brachyphylla =

Conservation status
- Priority Two — Poorly Known Taxa (DEC)

Scientific classification
- Kingdom: Plantae
- Clade: Tracheophytes
- Clade: Angiosperms
- Clade: Eudicots
- Clade: Rosids
- Order: Fabales
- Family: Fabaceae
- Subfamily: Faboideae
- Genus: Pultenaea
- Species: P. brachyphylla

Binomial name
- Pultenaea brachyphylla E.Pritz.

Species of flowering plant

Pultenaea brachyphylla is a species of flowering plant in the family Fabaceae and is endemic to the south of Western Australia. It is an erect, spindly shrub with cylindrical, grooved leaves and yellow, orange and brown flowers.

== Description ==
Pultenaea brachyphylla is an erect, spindly shrub that typically grows to a height of up to 50 cm (20 in) with glabrous stems. The leaves are cylindrical but with a groove along the upper surface, 3–8 mm (0.12–0.31 in) long and 0.8–1 mm (0.031–0.039 in) wide and hairy with stipules at the base. The flowers are yellow, orange and brown with multicoloured blotches. The flowers are sessile or borne on a pedicel up to 0.5 mm (0.020 in) long with hairy bracteoles 3–4 mm (0.12–0.16 in) long. The sepals are 6–6.5 mm (0.24–0.26 in) long and hairy. The standard petal is 8–9 mm (0.31–0.35 in) long, the wings are 6.5–8 mm (0.26–0.31 in) long and the keel 7–8.5 mm (0.28–0.33 in) long. Flowering occurs from September to October and the fruit is an oval pod.

== Taxonomy and naming ==
Pultenaea brachyphylla was first formally described in 1853 by Nikolai Turczaninow in the Bulletin de la Société Impériale des Naturalistes de Moscou from specimens collected by James Drummond. The specific epithet (brachyphylla) means "short-leaved".

== Distribution ==
This pultenaea occurs in the Esperance Plains and Mallee biogeographic regions, especially in the Fitzgerald River National Park in the south of Western Australia.

== Conservation status ==
Pultenaea brachyphylla is classified as "Priority Two" by the Western Australian Government Department of Parks and Wildlife meaning that it is poorly known and from only one or a few locations.
