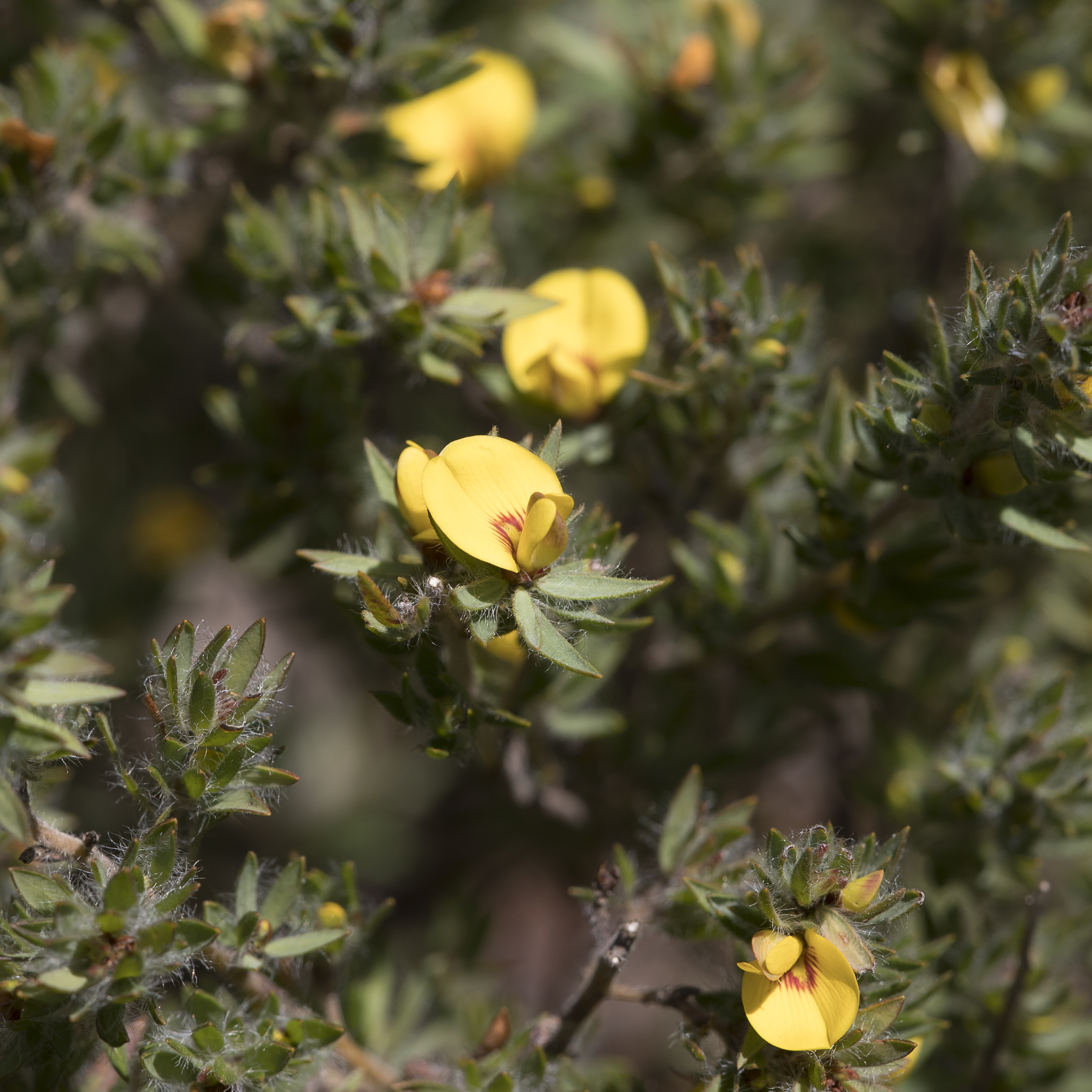
- Pultenaea involucrata in Scott Creek Conservation Park

Scientific classification
- Kingdom: Plantae
- Clade: Tracheophytes
- Clade: Angiosperms
- Clade: Eudicots
- Clade: Rosids
- Order: Fabales
- Family: Fabaceae
- Subfamily: Faboideae
- Genus: Pultenaea
- Species: P. involucrata

Binomial name
- Pultenaea involucrata Benth.

Synonyms
- Pultenaea fuscata F.Muell.

= Pultenaea involucrata =

Mount Lofty bush-pea

Species of flowering plant

Pultenaea involucrata is a species of flowering plant in the family Fabaceae and is endemic to the south-east of South Australia. It is a compact shrub with hairy branches, hairy egg-shaped to lance-shaped leaves, and yellow and red flowers.

== Description ==
Pultenaea involucrata is a compact shrub that typically grows to a height of up to 1 m (3 ft 3 in) and has branches with spreading, shaggy hairs. The leaves are egg-shaped to lance-shaped, 8–12 mm (0.31–0.47 in) long on a short petiole with egg-shaped stipules at the base. The lower surface and the edges of the leaves are covered with long, shaggy hairs. The flowers are about 8 mm (0.31 in) long and arranged singly near the ends of short, leafy side-branchlets, the flowers with many overlapping bracts up to 2.5 mm (0.098 in) long at the base. The sepals are about 3 mm (0.12 in) long with egg-shaped bracteoles about 3 mm (0.12 in) long attached to the pedicel. The standard petal is yellow with a red base, about 8 mm (0.31 in) wide, the wings are yellow and oblong, and the keel is oblong with a red tip. Flowering occurs from August to December and the fruit is an egg-shaped pod about 4 mm (0.16 in) long.

== Taxonomy and naming ==
Pultenaea involucrata was first formally described in 1864 by George Bentham in Flora Australiensis from specimens collected by Ferdinand von Mueller in the Mount Lofty Ranges. The specific epithet (involucrata) means having leaves or bracts around the base of the flowers.

== Distribution ==
This pultenaea occurs in the south-east of South Australia.
