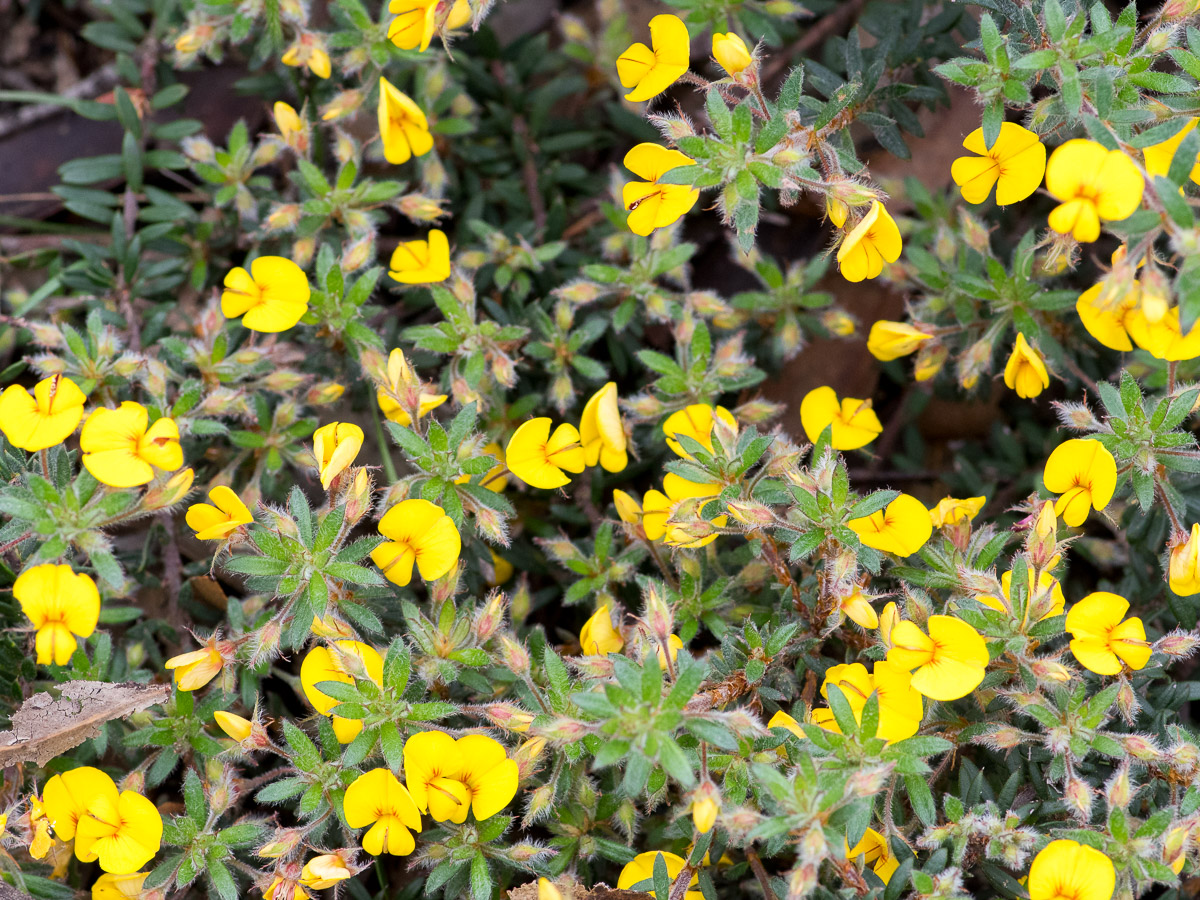
- In the Heathcote-Graytown National Park

Scientific classification
- Kingdom: Plantae
- Clade: Tracheophytes
- Clade: Angiosperms
- Clade: Eudicots
- Clade: Rosids
- Order: Fabales
- Family: Fabaceae
- Subfamily: Faboideae
- Genus: Pultenaea
- Species: P. dargilensis

Binomial name
- Pultenaea dargilensis Corrick & N.G.Walsh

= Pultenaea dargilensis =

Species of flowering plant

Pultenaea dargilensis is a species of flowering plant in the family Fabaceae and is endemic to a small area in central Victoria, Australia. It is a leaning or low-lying shrub with narrow elliptic to lance-shaped leaves and yellow flowers usually arranged singly on the ends of branchlets.

== Description ==
Pultenaea dargilensis is a leaning or low-lying shrub that typically grows to a height of up to about 30 cm (12 in) and has hairy stems. The leaves are narrow elliptic to lance-shaped with the narrower end towards the base 4–8 mm (0.16–0.31 in) long and 1–2 mm (0.039–0.079 in) wide with a pointed tip and lance-shaped stipules 2.0–2.5 mm (0.079–0.098 in) long at the base. The flowers are usually arranged singly on the ends of branchlets on peduncles 5–10 mm (0.20–0.39 in) long. The sepals are about 4–5 mm (0.16–0.20 in) long and densely hairy with linear bracteoles 5–6 mm (0.20–0.24 in) long at the base of the sepal tube. The standard petal is yellow with red markings, 7–8 mm (0.28–0.31 in) long, the ovary is hairy and the fruit is a flattened, hairy pod with the remains of the sepals attached. Flowering occurs from October to November.

== Taxonomy and naming ==
Pultenaea dargilensis was first formally described in 2009 by Margaret Corrick and Neville Walsh in the journal Muelleria from specimens collected by Corrick near Heathcote in 2001. The specific epithet (dargilensis) refers to the Dargile Forest where this species was discovered.

== Distribution and habitat ==
This pultenaea usually grows in forest in the Heathcote-Graytown National Park in central Victoria.
