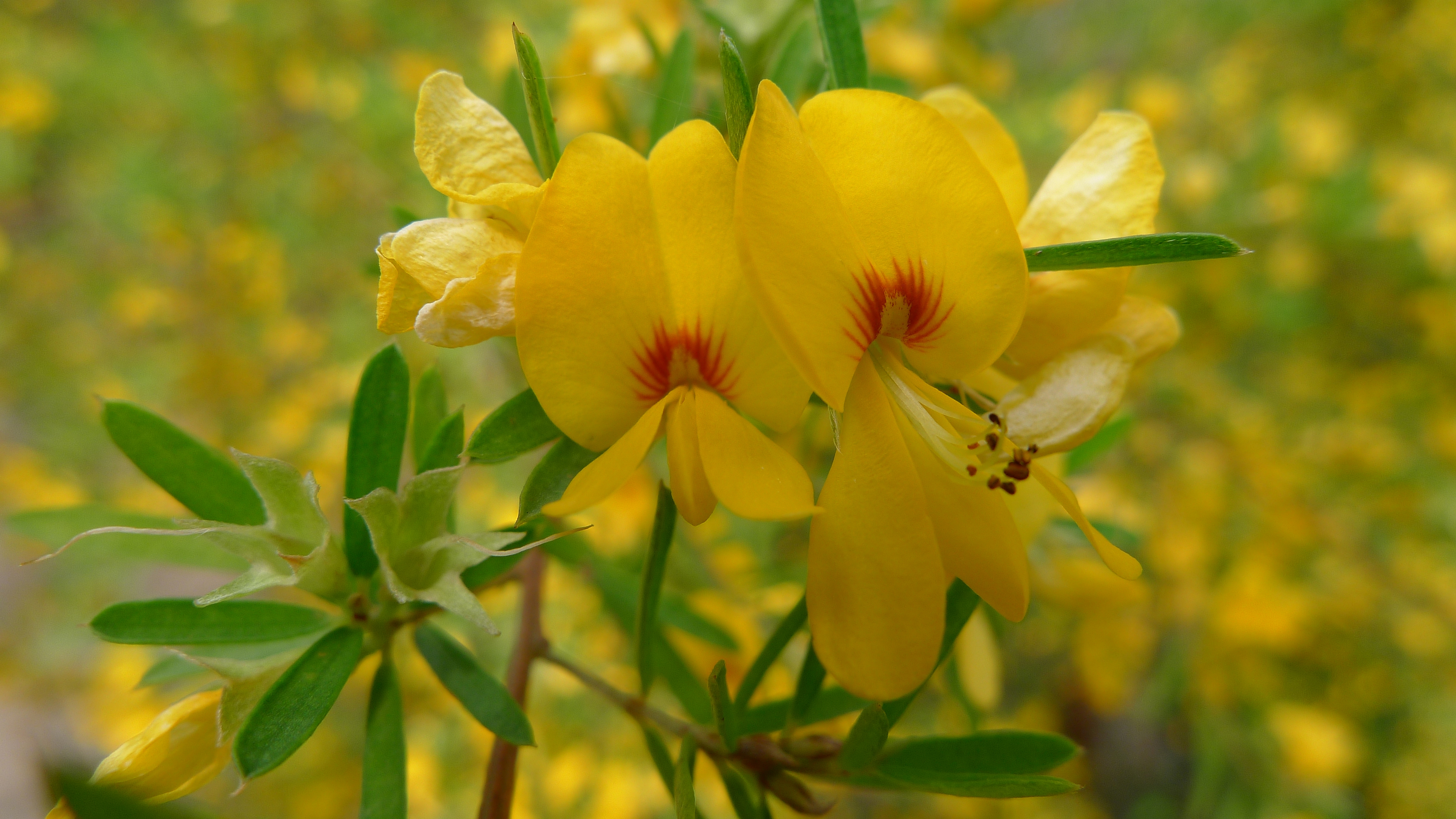
- Pultenaea blakelyi in the Royal National Park

Scientific classification
- Kingdom: Plantae
- Clade: Tracheophytes
- Clade: Angiosperms
- Clade: Eudicots
- Clade: Rosids
- Order: Fabales
- Family: Fabaceae
- Subfamily: Faboideae
- Genus: Pultenaea
- Species: P. blakelyi

Binomial name
- Pultenaea blakelyi Joy Thomps.

Synonyms
- Pultenaea flexilis var. mucronata Benth.; Pultenaea juniperina var. mucronata (Benth.) Corrick; Pultenaea juniperina var. planifolia H.B.Will.; Pultenaea trinervia Blakely

= Pultenaea blakelyi =

Blakely's bush-pea

Species of legume

Pultenaea blakelyi, commonly known as Blakely's bush-pea, is a species of flowering plant in the family Fabaceae and is endemic to south-eastern continental Australia. It is an erect shrub with sharply-pointed, narrow elliptic to egg-shaped leaves and yellow to orange flowers in open clusters in leaf axils or at the ends of branches.

== Description ==
Pultenaea blakelyi is an erect shrub that grows to a height 1–4 m (3 ft 3 in – 13 ft 1 in), but typically up to 2.5 m (8 ft 2 in), and has stems that are hairy when young. The leaves are mostly arranged in opposite pairs, narrow elliptic to egg-shaped with the narrower end towards the base, 10–20 mm (0.39–0.79 in) long and 1–2.5 mm (0.039–0.098 in) wide. There are stipules 1–1.5 mm (0.039–0.059 in) long at the base and a sharp point at the tip. The flowers are yellow, 7–9 mm (0.28–0.35 in) long and borne in open clusters in leaf axils or at the ends of branchlets on pedicels about 2 mm (0.079 in) long. There are lance-shaped bracteoles 1–2 mm (0.039–0.079 in) long at the base of the sepals. The sepals are 4–5 mm (0.16–0.20 in) long and hairy and the standard petal is 7–9 mm (0.28–0.35 in) long. Flowering occurs from September to December and the fruit is a flattened oval pod 7–10 mm (0.28–0.39 in) long.

== Taxonomy and naming ==
This species was first formally described in 1941 by William Blakely who gave it the name Pultenaea trinervia in Contribution from the new South Wales Herbarium. In 1958, Joy Thompson changed its name to Pultenaea blakelyi in Proceedings of the Linnean Society of New South Wales, distinguishing it from Pultenaea trinervis J.M.Black. The specific epithet (blakelyi) honours Blakely.

== Distribution and habitat ==
Pultenaea blakelyi grows in forest on the coast and tablelands of New South Wales between Myall Lakes and Merimbula but there is also a single record from Traralgon in Victoria.
