= Pultenaea victoriensis =

Scientific classification
- Kingdom: Plantae
- Clade: Tracheophytes
- Clade: Angiosperms
- Clade: Eudicots
- Clade: Rosids
- Order: Fabales
- Family: Fabaceae
- Subfamily: Faboideae
- Genus: Pultenaea
- Species: P. victoriensis

Binomial name
- Pultenaea victoriensis Corrick

Synonyms
- Pultenaea sp. aff. scabra (Grampians)

Species of plant

Pultenaea victoriensis is a species of flowering plant in the family Fabaceae and is endemic to a restricted area of Victoria, Australia. It is a shrub with hairy young stems, wedge-shaped to oblong leaves with a notched tip, and yellow and dark red, pea-like flowers.

== Description ==
Pultenaea victoriensis is a shrub that typically grows to a height of 0.5–3 m (1 ft 8 in – 9 ft 10 in), its young stems with hairs flattened against the surface. The leaves are arranged alternately, wedge-shaped to oblong with a notched tip, mostly 4–13 mm (0.16–0.51 in) long and 2–4 mm (0.079–0.157 in) wide on a petiole 0.75–1.0 mm (0.030–0.039 in) long with stipules 1.0–1.5 mm (0.039–0.059 in) long pressed against the stem at the base. The flowers are usually arranged singly at the ends of short side branches with six to nine egg-shaped bracts 1.5–8.0 mm (0.059–0.315 in) long, but that fall off as the flower opens. The sepals are 6–8 mm (0.24–0.31 in) long with bracteoles 3.5–5.0 mm (0.14–0.20 in) long attached to the sepal tube. The standard petal is yellow with red lines and 11–14 mm (0.43–0.55 in) long, the wings deep yellow and 10–11 mm (0.39–0.43 in) long, and the keel dark red with a cream-coloured base and the same length as the wings. Flowering occurs from November to December and the fruit is an egg-shaped pod 7–9 mm (0.28–0.35 in) long.

== Taxonomy ==
Pultenaea victoriensis was first formally described in 1993 by Margaret G. Corrick in the journal Muelleria from specimens she collected near the Victoria Range Track in the Western Grampians in 1991.

== Distribution and habitat ==
Pultenaea victoriensis only occurs on the high rocky slopes of the Victoria Range at altitudes above 850 m (2,790 ft).
