= Pultenaea lapidosa =

Scientific classification
- Kingdom: Plantae
- Clade: Tracheophytes
- Clade: Angiosperms
- Clade: Eudicots
- Clade: Rosids
- Order: Fabales
- Family: Fabaceae
- Subfamily: Faboideae
- Genus: Pultenaea
- Species: P. lapidosa

Binomial name
- Pultenaea lapidosa Corrick

Species of flowering plant

Pultenaea lapidosa is a species of flowering plant in the family Fabaceae and is endemic to south-eastern Australia. It is an erect to low-lying shrub with linear to narrow elliptic leaves and deep orange and dark red flowers.

== Description ==
Pultenaea lapidosa is an erect to low-lying shrub that typically grows to a height of 30–60 cm (12–24 in) and has sparsely hairy young stems. The leaves are linear to narrow elliptic, 6–16 mm (0.24–0.63 in) long and 0.5–2 mm (0.020–0.079 in) wide on a petiole 1.0–1.5 mm (0.039–0.059 in) long with dark-colured stipules 4–5 mm (0.16–0.20 in) long at the base. The flowers are usually arranged in leafy racemes of ten to twenty-five on the ends of branches. The sepals are 9–10 mm (0.35–0.39 in) long and glabrous with hairy, three-lobed bracteoles 5–6 mm (0.20–0.24 in) long at the base of the sepal tube. The standard petal is yellow to orange with reddish markings, the wings yellow to orange and the keel dark red. Flowering occurs from November to December and the fruit is an oval pod 6–7 mm (0.24–0.28 in) long.

== Taxonomy and naming ==
Pultenaea lapidosa was first formally described in 1994 by Margaret Corrick in the journal Muelleria from specimens she collected near Omeo in 1986. The specific epithet (lapidosa) means "stony", referring to the favoured habitat of this species.

== Distribution and habitat ==
Stony push-pea grows on stony slopes in heathy understorey of woodland in two disjunct populations in Victoria and on the Central Tablelands of New South Wales.

== Conservation status ==
This hibbertia is classified as "vulnerable" under the Victorian Government Flora and Fauna Guarantee Act 1988.
