= Chauncy (restaurant) =

Restaurant in Heathcote, Victoria, Australia

- Interactive map of Chauncy

Restaurant information
- Established: 2021
- Owners: Louis Naepels and Tess Murray
- Head chef: Louis Naepels
- Food type: French
- Rating: 2 Chef Hats in 'The Age Good Food Guide'
- Location: 178 High Street Heathcote, Victoria, 3523, Australia
- Coordinates: 36°55′6.01″S 144°42′20.82″E
- Website: https://chauncy.com.au/

Chauncy is a French bistro restaurant located in Heathcote, Victoria.

== Description ==
Chauncy is located on the main street in Heathcote and was established in 2021. It resides in a heritage-listed sandstone building that was built in 1854, originally the office and residence of Philip Chauncy, the chief surveyor of the district.

The restaurant is owned by chef Louis Naepels and his partner Tess Murray, who is a sommelier. Naepels is French, and much of the menu is inspired by his experiences in Basque Country in south-western France. He was previously also the head chef at Grossi Florentino, in Melbourne. Murray has experience in some of Melbourne's best restaurants, including Supernormal and Cutler & Co, and has done vintages making wine in Burgundy and the Mornington Peninsula.

== Reception ==
A review of the restaurant in The Sydney Morning Herald referred to Chauncy as the "most affordable two-hatted dining in Victoria."

It was voted as The Age Good Food Guide's 'Best Regional Restaurant' in its 2024 awards.

Gourmet Traveller awarded Chancy "Best Destination Dining' in Australia for 2025, and included it in their list of the top 25 restaurants in Victoria.

In the 2025 Good Food Guide, Murray was awarded "Sommelier of the Year", and Chauncy retained its two hats.

A review of the restaurant in October 2025 noted that dining at Chauncy was "an intimate, hosted experience, where everyone enjoys the same long, lovely progression of courses, and you’re looked after with exquisite care by the owners."
