= Harry Cope =

Australian rules footballer

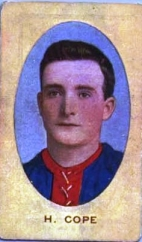

Personal information
- Full name: Waratah Henry Hubert Cope
- Born: 28 January 1881; Heathcote, Victoria
- Died: 6 November 1947 (aged 66); Bendigo, Victoria
- Original team: Port Melbourne

Playing career^{1}
Years	Club	Games (Goals)
1907–13	Melbourne	52 (6)
- ^{1} Playing statistics correct to the end of 1913.

Harry Cope (28 January 1881 – 6 November 1947) was an Australian rules footballer who played with Melbourne in the Victorian Football League (VFL).
