= Pultenaea sericea =

Chaffy bush-pea

Scientific classification
- Kingdom: Plantae
- Clade: Tracheophytes
- Clade: Angiosperms
- Clade: Eudicots
- Clade: Rosids
- Order: Fabales
- Family: Fabaceae
- Subfamily: Faboideae
- Genus: Pultenaea
- Species: P. sericea

Binomial name
- Pultenaea sericea (Benth.) Corrick

Synonyms
- Pultenaea paleacea var. sericeaBenth.

Species of plant

Pultenaea sericea, commonly known as chaffy bush-pea, is a species of flowering plant in the family Fabaceae and is endemic to south-eastern Australia. It is a small, straggling shrub with hairy branches, elliptic to linear leaves, and yellow and red to purple, pea-like flowers.

== Description ==
Pultenaea sericea is a small, straggling shrub that typically grows to a height of 20–30 cm (7.9–11.8 in) with hairy branches. The leaves are arranged alternately, elliptic to linear, 6–25 mm (0.24–0.98 in) long and 1–3 mm (0.039–0.118 in) wide with a sharp point on the end and stipules 5–10 mm (0.20–0.39 in) long pressed against the stem at the base. The flowers are arranged in dense clusters of more than three, each flower on a pedicel 0.5–1 mm (0.020–0.039 in) long with a few papery bracts at the base and linear bracteoles 3–5 mm (0.12–0.20 in) long attached to the sepal tube. The sepals are 5.0–5.5 mm (0.20–0.22 in) long, the standard petal is yellow to orange and 7.8–10 mm (0.31–0.39 in) long, the wings are yellow to orange and 7.5–9 mm (0.30–0.35 in) long, and the keel is red to purple and 7.2–9 mm (0.28–0.35 in) long. Flowering occurs from September to November and the fruit is a flattened pod 5–6 mm (0.20–0.24 in) long.

== Taxonomy ==
Chaffy bush-pea was first formally described in 1864 by George Bentham who gave it the name Pultenaea paleacea var. sericea in Flora Australiensis. In 1995, Margaret Georgina Corrick raised the variety to species status as Pultenaea sericea in the journal Muelleria, and the name is accepted by the Australian Plant Census. The specific epithet (sericea) means "silky".

== Distribution and habitat ==
Pultenaea sericea mainly grows in coastal heathland and seasonally wet areas east of Melbourne. It also occurs in north-eastern Tasmania and there is a single record from the Nadgee Nature Reserve in New South Wales.

== Conservation status ==
This species is listed as "vulnerable" under the Tasmanian Government Threatened Species Protection Act 1995.
