= Pink Cliffs Geological Reserve =

Gold mining site in Victoria, Australia

- IUCN category III (natural monument or feature)
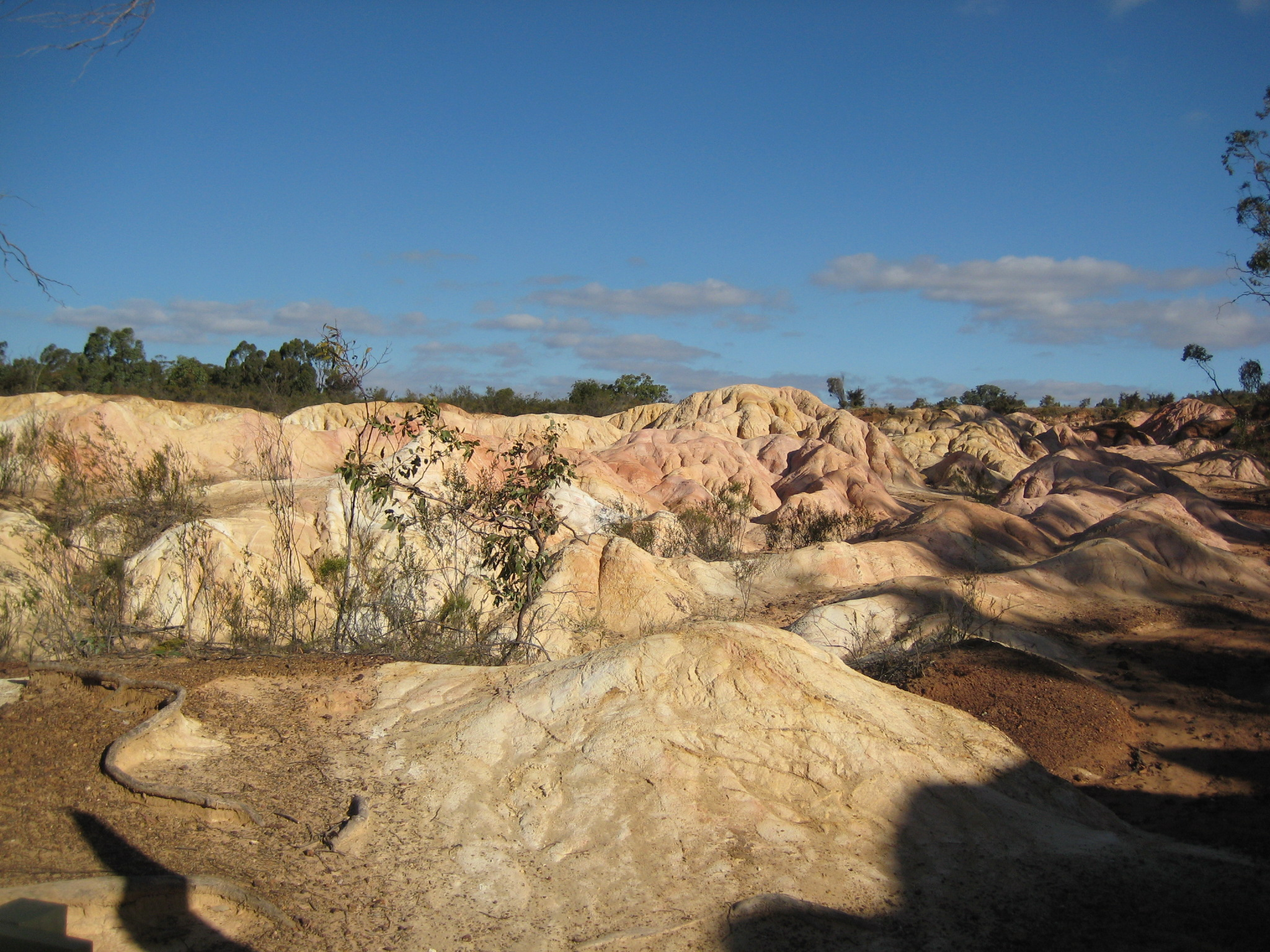
- Pink Cliffs Geological Reserve

- Location within Victoria
- Location: Victoria
- Nearest city: Heathcote, Victoria
- Coordinates: 36°55′49.6″S 144°42′18.5″E
- Area: 0.38 km^{2} (0.15 sq mi)
- Established: 1870
- Governing body: Parks Victoria
- Website: Official website

The Pink Cliffs Geological Reserve is a historically and geologically significant former gold mining site in Heathcote, Victoria, and a popular tourist destination. The particular mining technique used there between 1870 and 1890 involved high-pressure water washing away layers of soil to extract gold. The erosion caused by this process created the lunar-like landscape of the area and the distinctive pink and pastel colours that characterise the surrounding clay cliffs. The site is listed on the Victorian Heritage Register (VHR) Number H1352. It is identified as a Terrestrial and Inland Waters Protected Area, and has an area of 0.38 square kilometres.

== Tourism ==
The Pink Cliffs Geological Reserve is located on Pink Cliffs Road, close to the town centre of Heathcote, Victoria, Australia, in the City of Greater Bendigo, approximately 100 kilometres (62 mi) north of Melbourne. It lies on the edge of the Heathcote-Graytown National Park and is located on the traditional lands of the Taungurung people. The site is managed by Parks Victoria, which helps to protect the reserve's natural, historical, and cultural features.

The reserve is one of the region's most notable sites, popular with tourists and nature-lovers, especially bushwalkers and photographers, and those exploring the region's gold rush history. Free to enter, the site consists of mini gorges, hills of fine pink clay with an almost talcum-powder texture, and smooth ironstone. These colourful and unusual geological features, which resemble a lunar landscape, result from the sluicing gold-mining processes used by miners in the 1880s. There are several walking tracks throughout the Pink Cliffs reserve. These take you on a 1.1 kilometre signed, educational circuit walk, and to upper and lower lookouts over the pink cliffs.

== History ==
Before the discovery of gold in the Heathcote area, the site of the Pink Cliffs Geological Reserve was open box forest with scrubby undergrowth on a layer of red-brown soil over gravel. In 1852, early prospectors discovered the first gold nuggets in the area. The significance of the site stems from it being a well-preserved example of a form of gold mining that is now redundant. Hydraulic sluicing was an important late nineteenth-century development in mining technology, which enabled the continued and more efficacious exploitation of Victoria's dwindling alluvial gold deposits. Information signs at the reserve highlight the mining process and its impact, noting the contributions of Thomas Hedley and John Wallace, who advanced sluicing techniques by using pumped water instead of gravity-fed systems.

=== Hydraulic Sluicing ===
In 1865, the McIvor Hydraulic Sluicing and Gold Mining Company Limited proposed to bring water from the head of the McIvor, Sandy, and Wild Duck Creeks to an elevation at Heathcote for sluicing purposes. Hydraulic sluicing is a mining method that employs high-pressure water jets to wash away soil and gravel down through a sluice box. Water for the sluicing was delivered to the site by water race, and high-pressure pipelines and hoses were then directed at the gold-bearing deposits. As the top layer of earth is washed away, any gold remains in the sluice. In 1874, Thomas Hedley, on behalf of the Hon. John A. Wallace, made application for water rights on the McIvor Creek and Long Gully and proceeded to bring a race belonging to the Water Trust to Heathcote. Hedley was a pioneer in the development of sluicing technology in Victoria and a prominent figure in Victoria's late 19th-century gold mining industry.

In 1887, Hedley and Wallace began experimenting with pumping water, instead of the hydraulic sluicing method that relied on the pressure gained from the gravity-fed water race. This mining method was extremely effective, but it caused significant environmental damage and impacted local waterways and agriculture. In 1887, mud and gravel (sludge) washing back into the creek became a major concern. It was running over grazing lands, ruining the local landscape and negatively impacting the local water supply for the town, stock, and landowners. These concerns resulted in the formation of the Sludge Inquiry Board. In 1890, the gold mining operations at the Pink Cliffs Geological Reserve were closed down when the mining lease for the Heathcote Sluicing Company was not renewed, mainly due to Sludge Inquiry Board decisions.

== See also ==
- Heathcote-Graytown National Park
