= Hotel Australia =

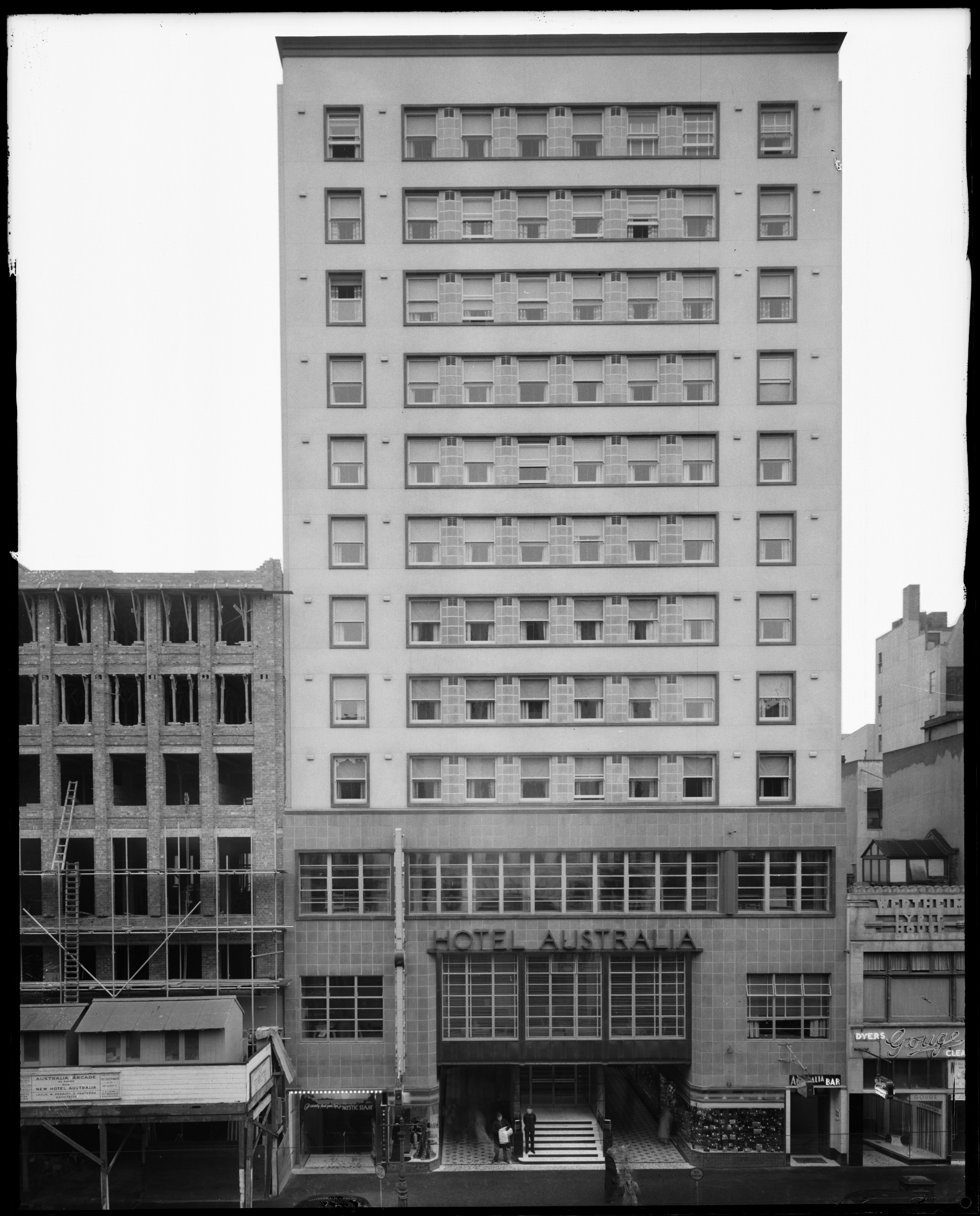
- Former names: Cafe Gunsler (1879–1890); Vienna Cafe (1890–1916)

General information
- Location: 266 Collins Street, Melbourne, Australia
- Opened: 1939
- Closed: 1987
- Demolished: 1989
- Cost: Approx. £150,000

Technical details
- Floor count: 12

Design and construction
- Architects: E. F. Billson (c. 1947-55); Les Perrott Snr. (1936–37); Walter B. Griffin (1916); Marion M. Griffin (1916)
- Developer: Australia Arcade Pty Ltd

Other information
- Number of stores: 41 (1939)
- Number of rooms: 94 (1939)

The Hotel Australia was a former hotel in Melbourne, Australia. The hotel was built in 1939 on the site of the former Cafe Australia (which had opened in 1916), and was demolished in 1989.

Designed by Leslie M. Perrott Senior, the Hotel Australia was a 12-storey building with 94 rooms, numerous private dining and function rooms, and was the most prestigious hotel in Melbourne in its day.

The hotel included two small air-conditioned cinemas, a restaurant and bar in the basement, and a through-block shopping arcade on the ground floor with 41 shops, which was touted as the largest in Australia, known as the Australia Arcade.

Many of the bars within the new hotel quickly became popular meeting places for homosexual men, particularly the first floor cocktail bar and the basement public bar, which from 1970-80 became the Woolshed. The former hotel site is now occupied by a Novotel hotel and the 260 Collins arcade.

== Original hotel ==
From the 1870s, the north side of Collins Street between Swanston and Elizabeth Streets became the most fashionable shopping area in Melbourne, known as ‘the block’. The Cafe Gunsler was established in 1879, located in the centre of the block, and was one of the most fashionable restaurants and event venues in the city. It was refurbished in 1890 and renamed the Vienna Cafe, which was bought in 1908 by another prominent restaurateur, the Greek-Australian Anthony Lucas. During 1916, World War 1, the cafe was closed due to its German associations.

Lucas employed the recently arrived Walter Burley Griffin, who worked with his wife Marion Mahony Griffin, to design an extensive new cafe, with the more patriotic name of the Cafe Australia, that was initially to include a concert hall, and ‘winter garden’. Opening in October 1916, the cafe featured series of rooms, an entry bar, a Palm Court, a Fountain Court, leading through to the main arched roofed double height dining room. It was adorned with painted murals, sculpture and highly patterned plasterwork, and specially designed furniture and fittings, in the Griffin’s distinctive angular geometric style.

Anthony Lucas sold the site to Fredrick Matear, Arthur Matear and Norman Carlyon in mid-1927 and an extensive £20,000 refurbishment program commenced.

== New Hotel Australia ==
=== Design and construction (1936–1939) ===
In April 1937, Matear and Carlyon officially released plans for the new Hotel Australia. It was revealed that architect Leslie M. Perrott Senior and his firm had prepared a scheme for a twelve-story building included an arcade which would connect Collins to Little Collins, and line up with other lanes and arcades connecting Flinders Street right through to Bourke Street. In recognition of the popularity and unique design of the Cafe Australia, the hotel included an arched-roofed ballroom which was a simplified version of the cafe’s main room. Fred Matear sailed to Europe and America where he conducted a study of various leading hotels across several capital cities.

The freehold was owned and operated by a company called Australia Arcade Pty Ltd, which initially comprised directors: Lionel "Leo" Findon Miller (c. 1874–1963), Fredrick George Harber Matear (1887–1968), Norman Albert Miller (1875–1974), Robert Melville Cuthbertson (1869–1940) and Norman Dean Carlyon (1903–1986).

=== Opening and use during World War 2 (1939–1945) ===
The first event held at the new hotel took place on June 22, 1939, with a benefit gala for St. Vincent's Hospital.

Hand weaving designers Catherine Hardess and Mollie Grove returned to Australia in March 1940 they took their woven goods to the Hotel Australia where they staged an exhibition. The exhibition was opened by the then Prime Minister Robert Menzies. During World War II, Douglas MacArthur used two floors of the hotel as his headquarters for a time.

=== Post-war history (1945–1989) ===
The hotel hosted many dignitaries. Sir Robert Menzies enjoyed the hotel dining room while Harold Holt had his wedding reception at the hotel in 1946.

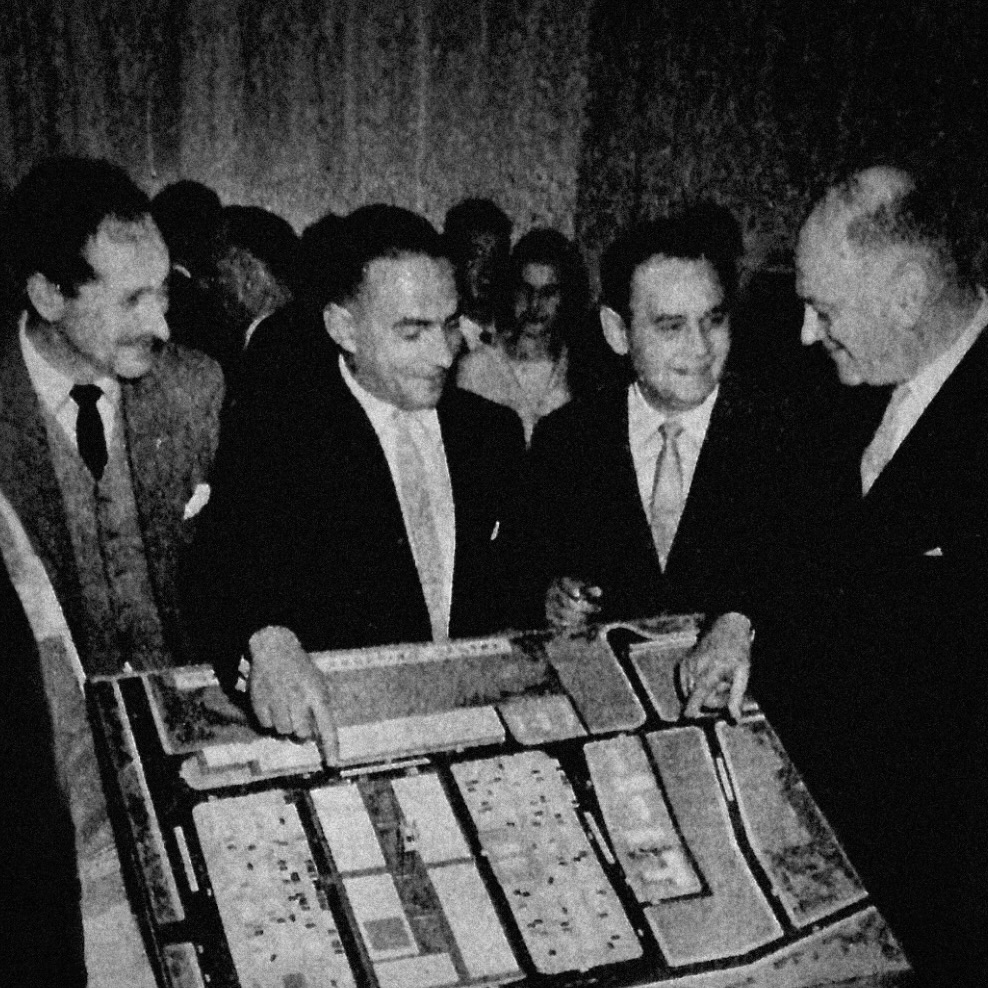
Announcement of Forest Hills Shopping Centre at the Hotel Australia, May 1959

Plans for the highly-anticipated Forest Hill Shopping Centre were unveiled during a May 1959 press conference at the hotel, which was attended by prominent businessmen including Paul Fayman, Norman Rockman, Raymond Borg, and Leslie M. Perrott Junior—the son of the hotel's architect and the designer of the shopping centre.

The Citistate development group bought the hotel in June 1987 at a price of $55 million. While preservationists wanted to save the structures, Citistate had purchased the building in a vacant state and claimed the building was a fire hazard, despite being a graded building in a heritage precinct, the City of Melbourne allowed the demolition.

The hotel was ultimately demolished in the winter of 1989, with the fire marshal declaring the demolition site a fire hazard. The replacement building included a budget hotel on top of a three level shopping arcade, which was known as the Australia On Collins. In 2018/19 the arcade was revamped and renamed St Collins Lane, and the hotel is currently the Novotel on Collins.

== Gallery ==
=== Photographs by Lyle Fowler (c. 1940s) ===
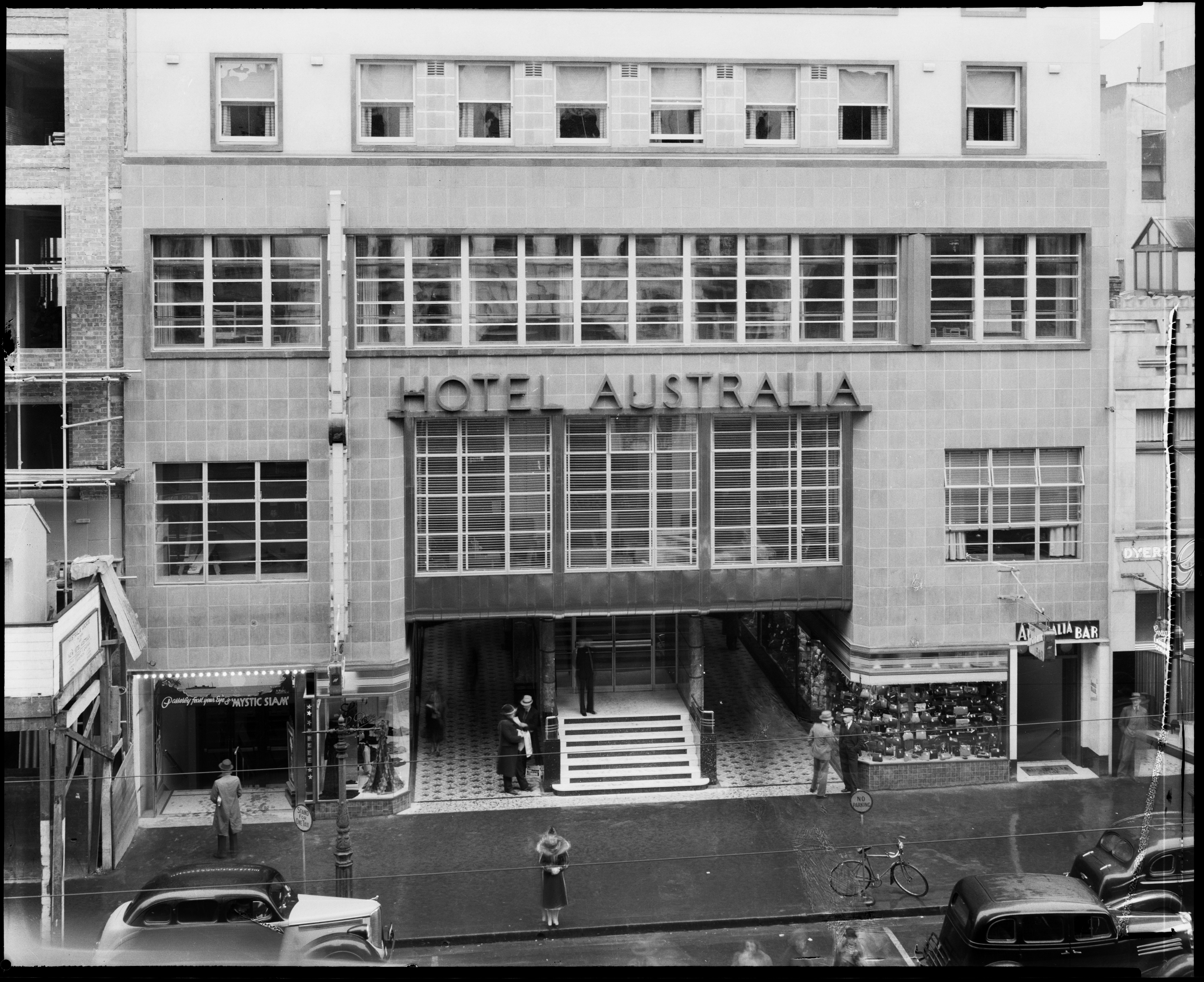

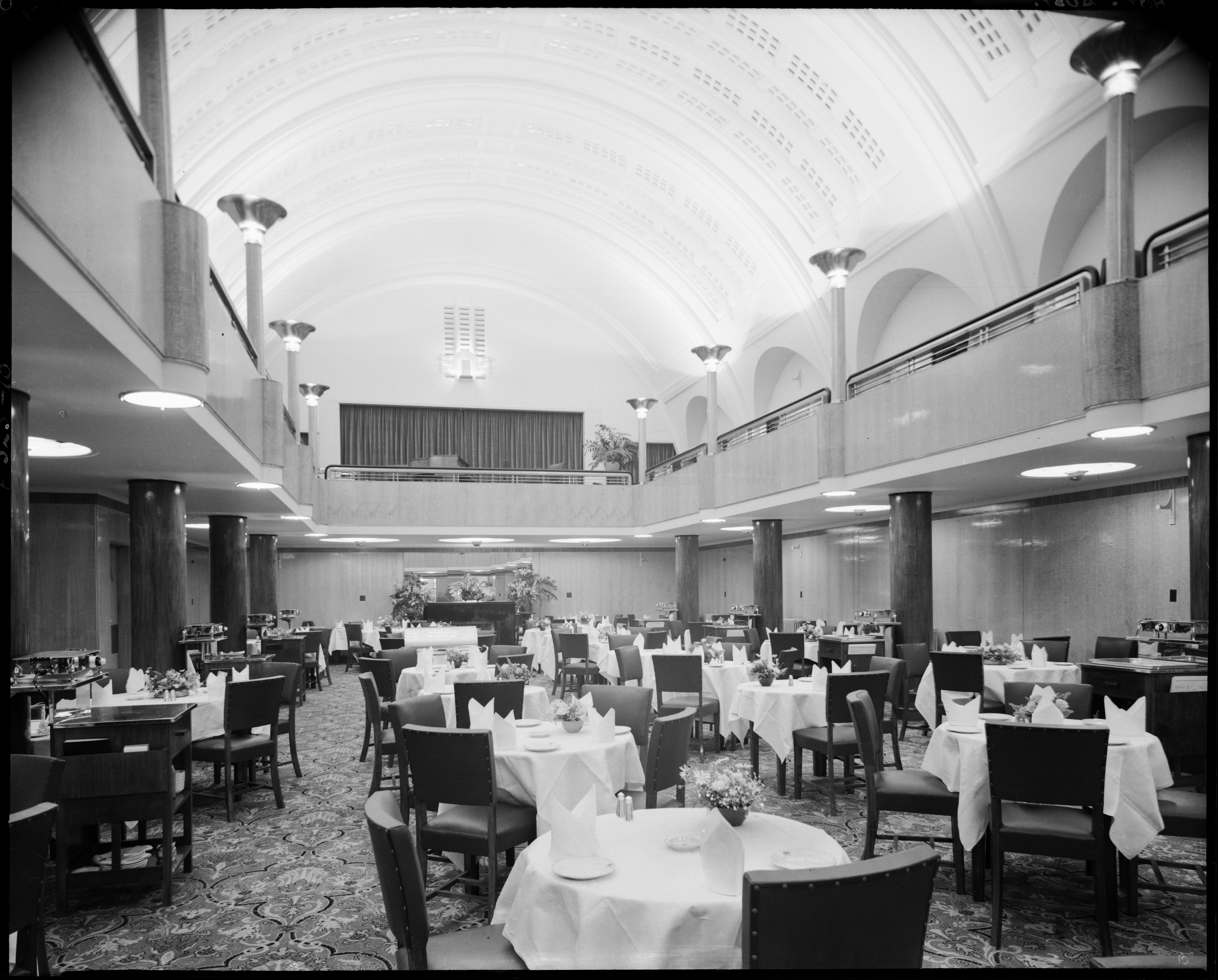

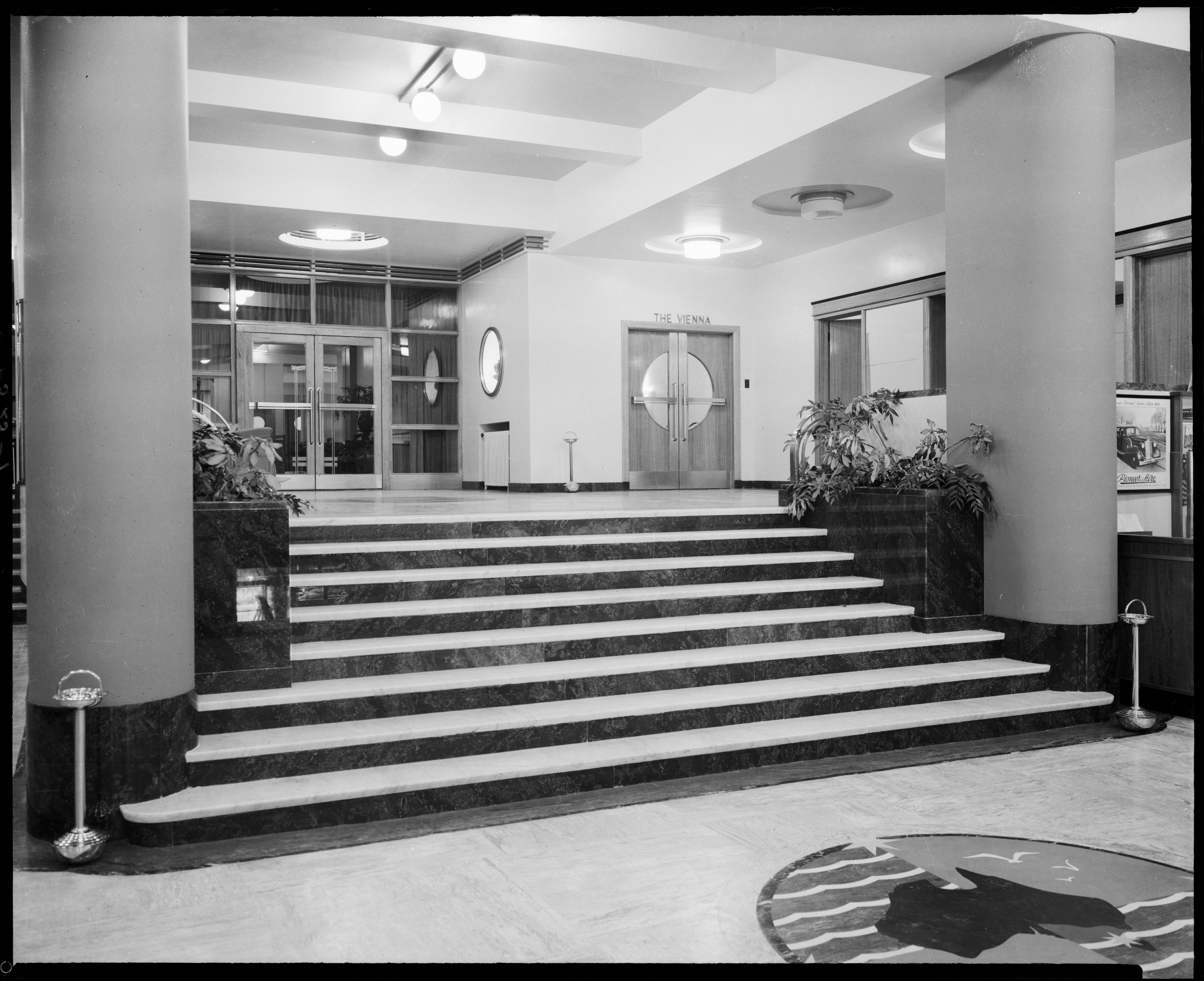

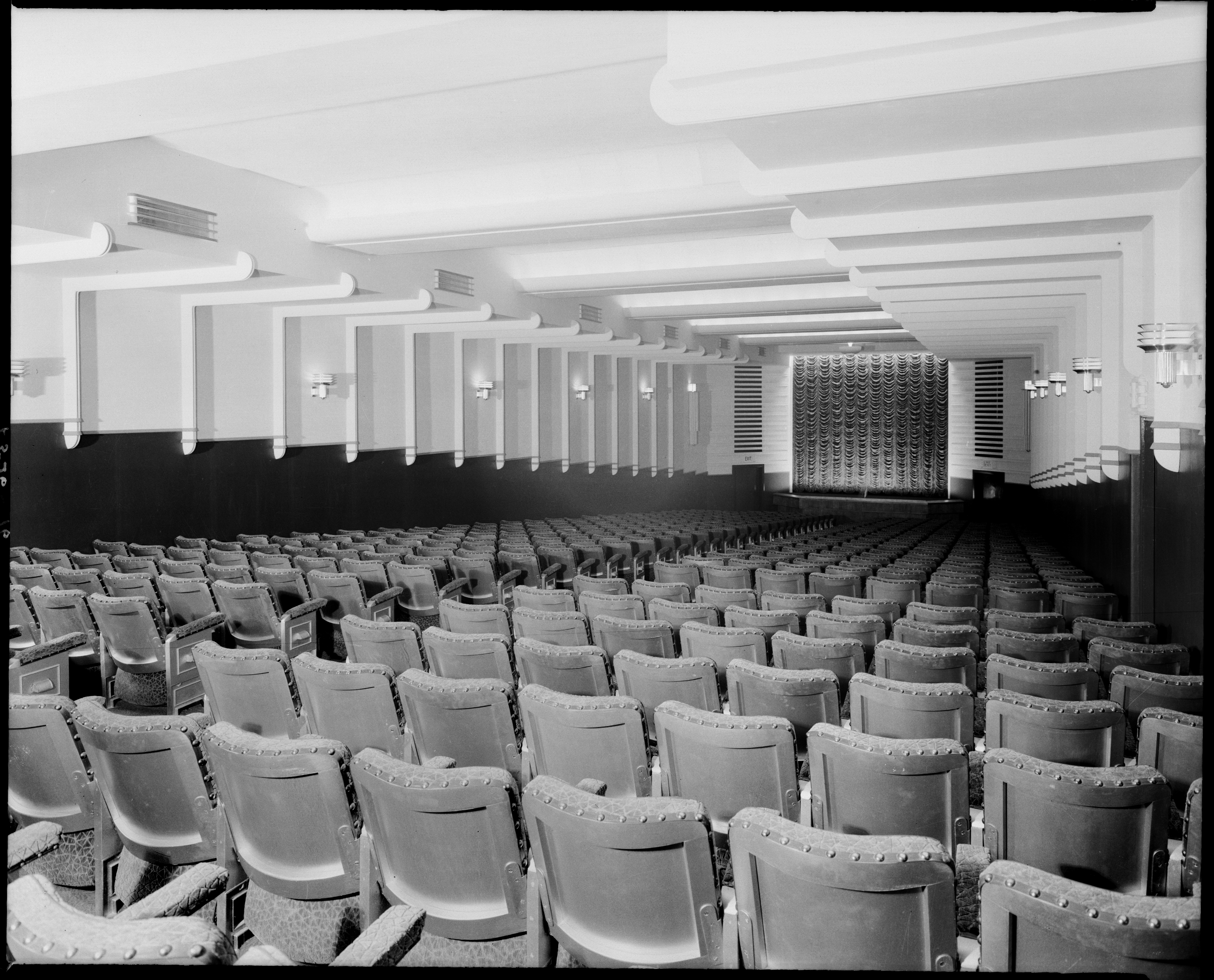

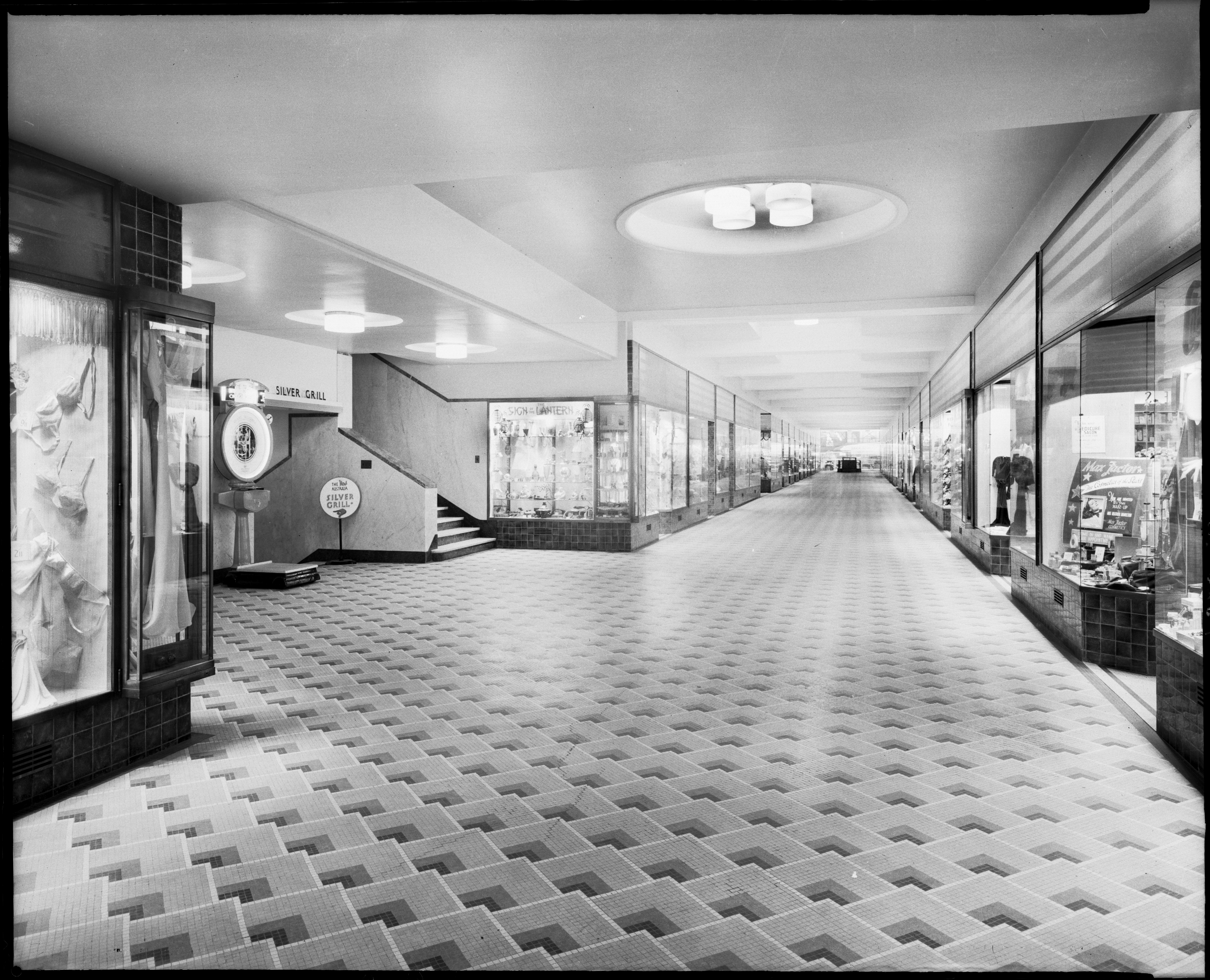
