= Mollie Grove =

Business & partner of Catherine Hard(r)ess

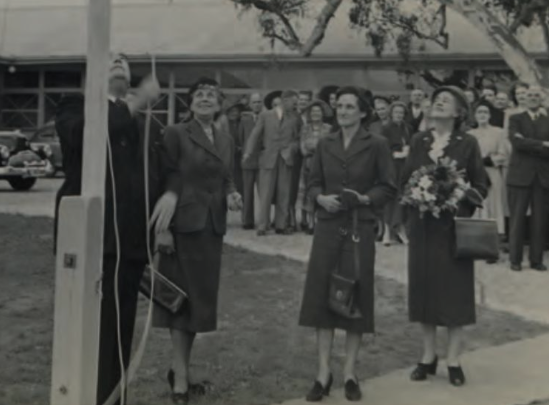
- 1951 factory opening by Robert Menzies at Dandenong, watched by Catherine Hardress and Mollie Grove
- Born: Edith Mary Grove; 14 September 1909; Hamilton, Victoria
- Died: 23 February 1996; Camberwell, Victoria
- Education: Methodist Ladies College, Kew
- Known for: Weaving

Edith Mary "Mollie" Grove (14 September 1909 – 23 February 1996) was an Australian weaver, textile designer, and business owner.

== Life ==
Grove was born in 1909 in Hamilton, Victoria to Methodist minister John William Grove, and Daisy Blanche (nee Galloway). The fourth of six children and the only girl, the family lived in Tasmania and Western Australia before settling in Victoria. Grove attended the Methodist Ladies' College (MLC) in Kew, where her father served as its second Principal.

She first met Catherine Hardess while studying an Applied Art course at Swinburne Technical College where Hardress was Head of the Fine Art Department. Grove was first studying to become a concert pianist before taking up art, teaching art and crafts at the Elsternwick campus of MLC. She travelled overseas at the behest of MLC to gather ideas to start up an art department at the school. Arriving in England in 1935, she enrolled at the London School of Arts and Crafts.

It was in England that she was reunited with Hardress who had arrived a few years earlier and was doing costume design for the Tunbridge Repertory Theatre in Kent. They ended up sharing a studio, and it was here after being snowed in for three weeks that they planned a trip to the countryside. It was at this Northampton cottage where Grove was first persuaded to try the loom and fell in love with weaving. Upon returning to London she left the School of Arts and Crafts and enrolled instead with the Kensington Weavers.

The three-month course allowed Grove to develop her skills by undertaking projects in carding, spinning, weaving, inlaying, and rug-making. The craft of weaving was for her the perfect blend of artistic creativity, and the technical precision and skill that made her such a good pianist. Under the tutelage of Frau Jorgens, a talented German weaver, Grove did an apprenticeship learning advanced weaving techniques. She furthered her research by working with a chemist to study how yarn was affected by various dyes.

Before returning to Australia in 1939, Hardress and Grove spent six months travelling Scandinavia and Russia gathering inspiration for their craft. Grove was particularly interested in the industrial development of weaving in Finland and Sweden. They arrived in Melbourne on 14 August 1939 on board the Dutch ship Arendskerk, which less than a year later was sunk by a German submarine. The women quickly found an ideal location for a new studio in the basement of the Royal Exchange Assurance Building on Queen Street, with a loom for Mollie and a theatre replica for Catherine.

=== eclarté ===
Their first shop was at the start of World War II displaying fabrics on urns in the store window of Batavia House. The Australian government sent their tweeds to the United States in 1940 as part of a display for the New York World's Fair. In March of 1940 an exhibition of their hand-woven fabrics at Hotel Australia was opened by Prime Minister Robert Menzies. Their displays appeared the Royal Show in Melbourne as part of the Australian Wool Board's Wool Court, with their creation being chosen by Governor Sir Winston Dugan to present as a gift to the Premier. Grove and Hardress are not only credited with the creation of beautiful fabrics but the advancement of the wool manufacturing industry in Australia.

"This exhibition will, I am sure, open up a new vision of beauty to the people who see it. We are the greatest wool-producing country, and we boast that we produce the finest wool in the world. Here we will see things entirely made and designed by two women."

— Robert Menzies, The Argus, 4 March 1940

With that, the weaving business eclarté was born, and Grove began by teaching the technical side of producing handwoven woollens. The influence of the war made imported fashion hard to come by and the growth in practice of the tradition of weaving gave rise to their early business success. For the 21st birthday of Princess Elizabeth she handpicked one of their tweed blankets made from royal violet wool. Offering tailored suits at half the price of comparable imported products and achieving an exclusivity deal with David Jones, eclarté became known as one of the best cloths in Australia.

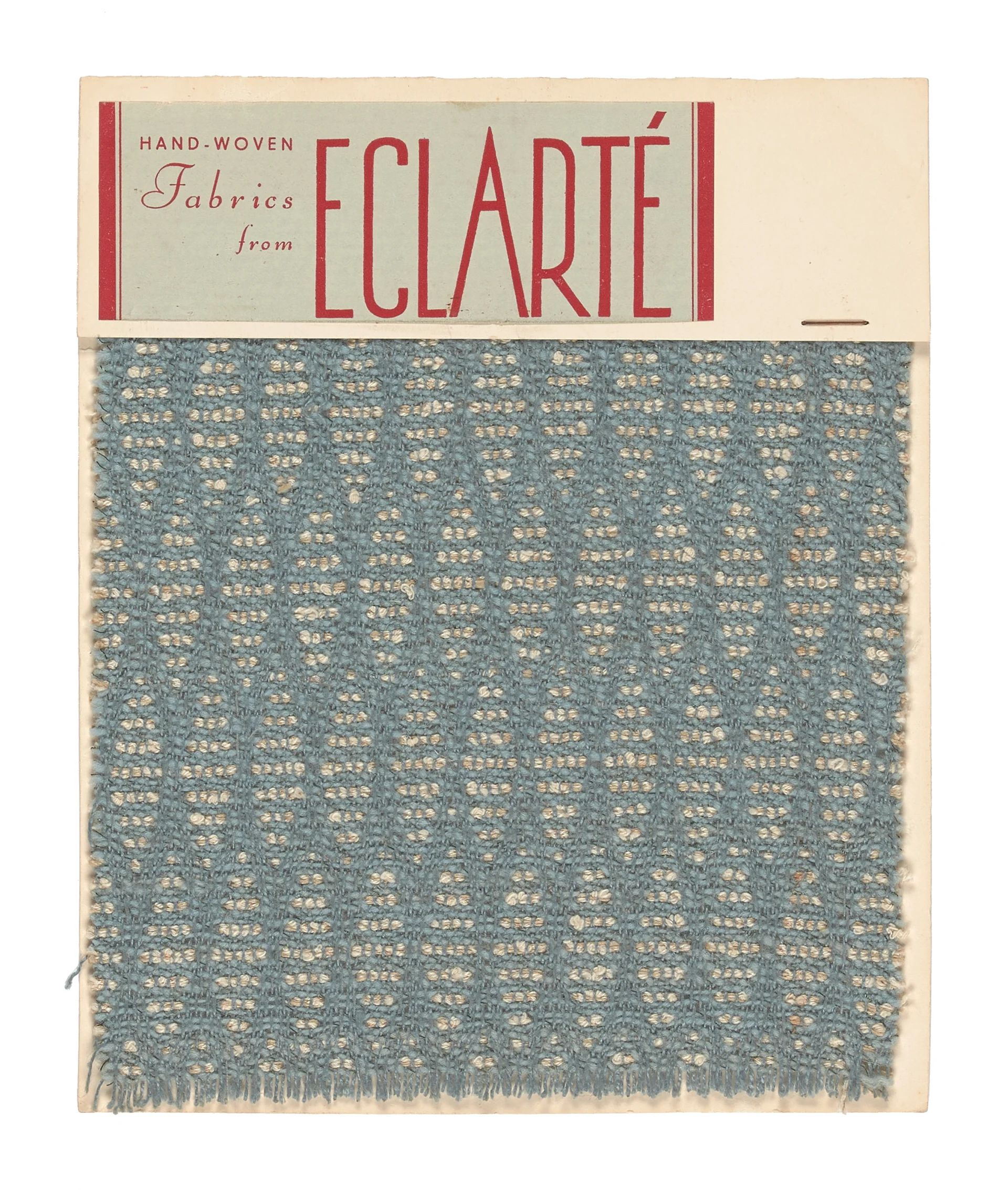

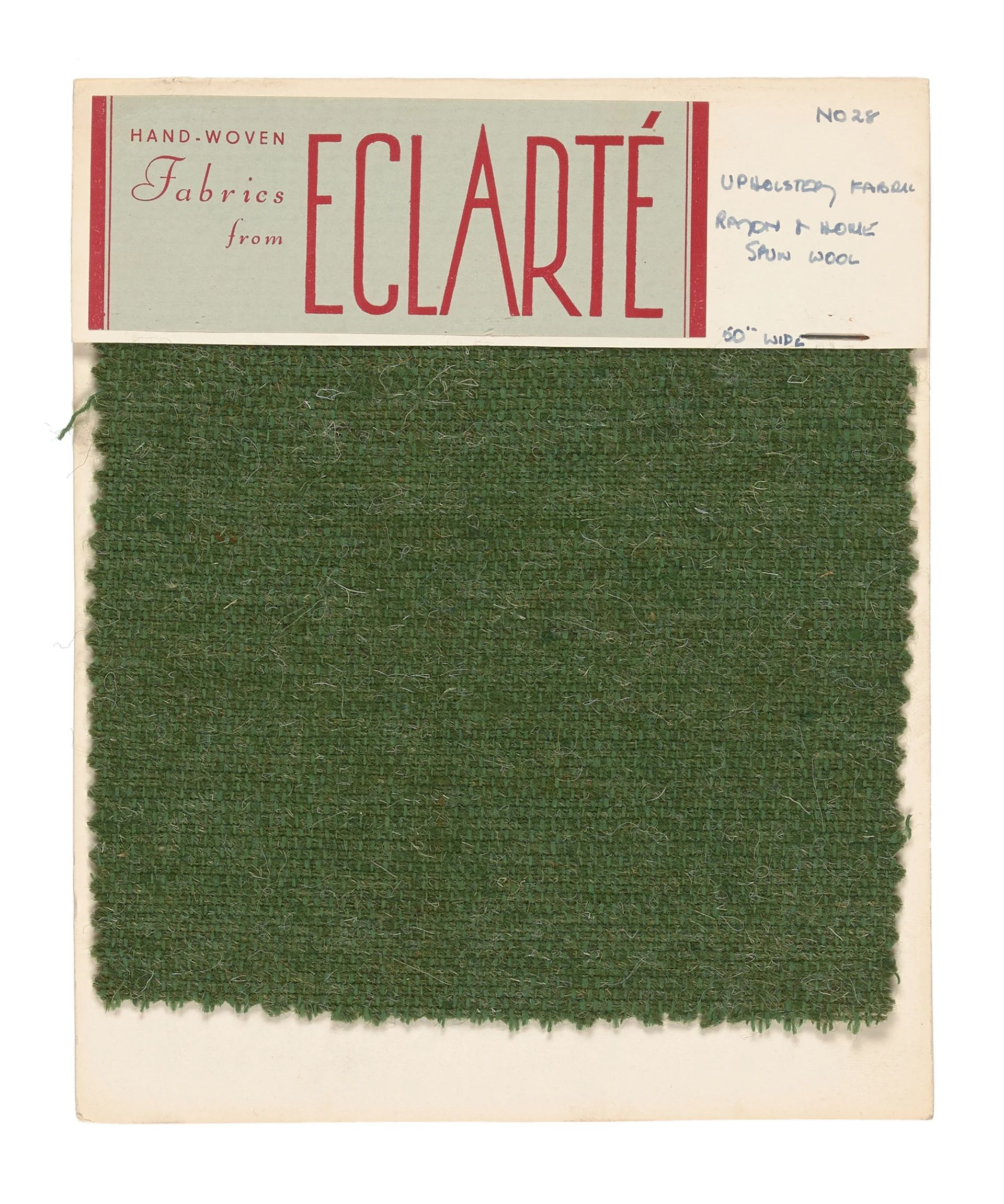

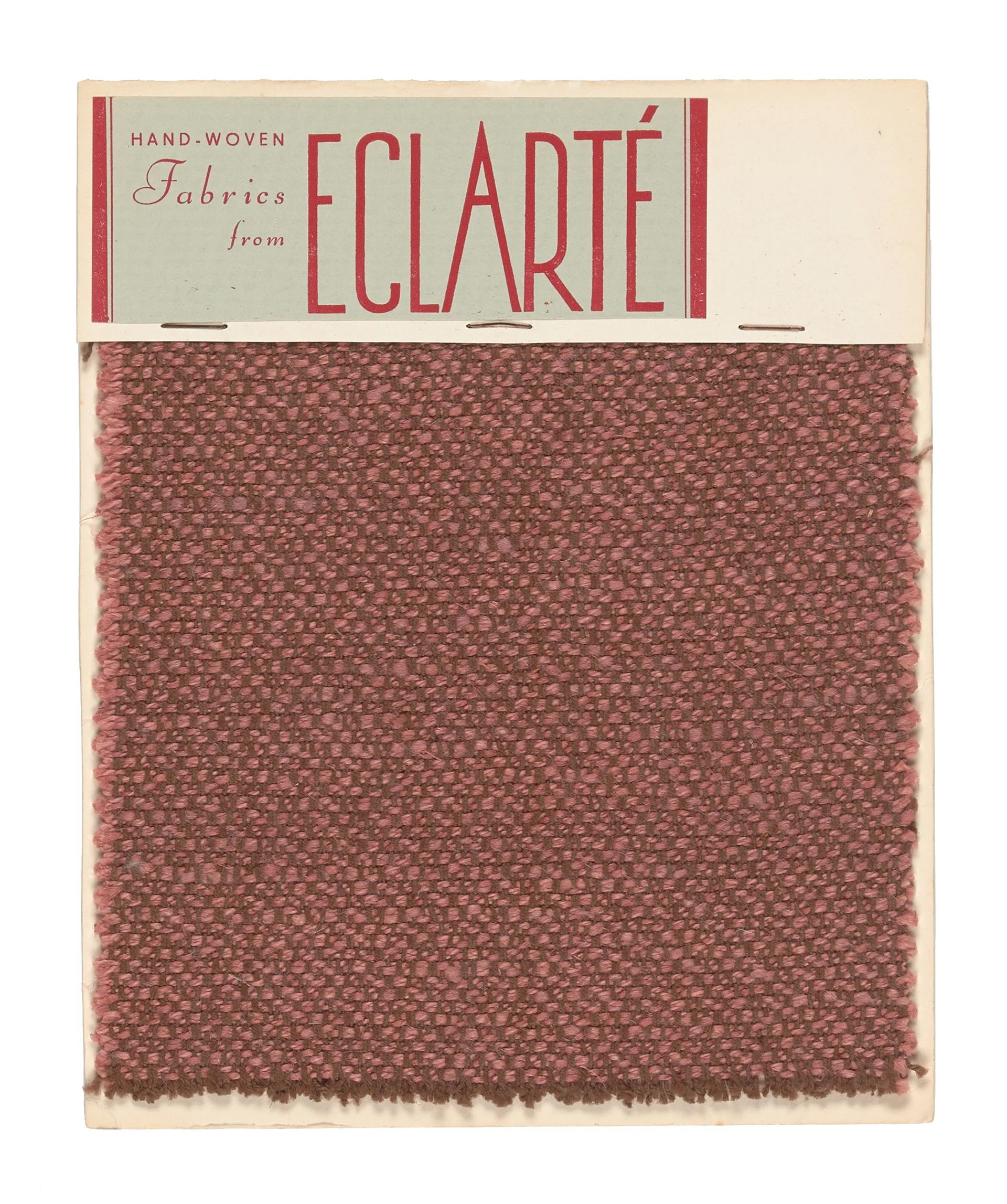

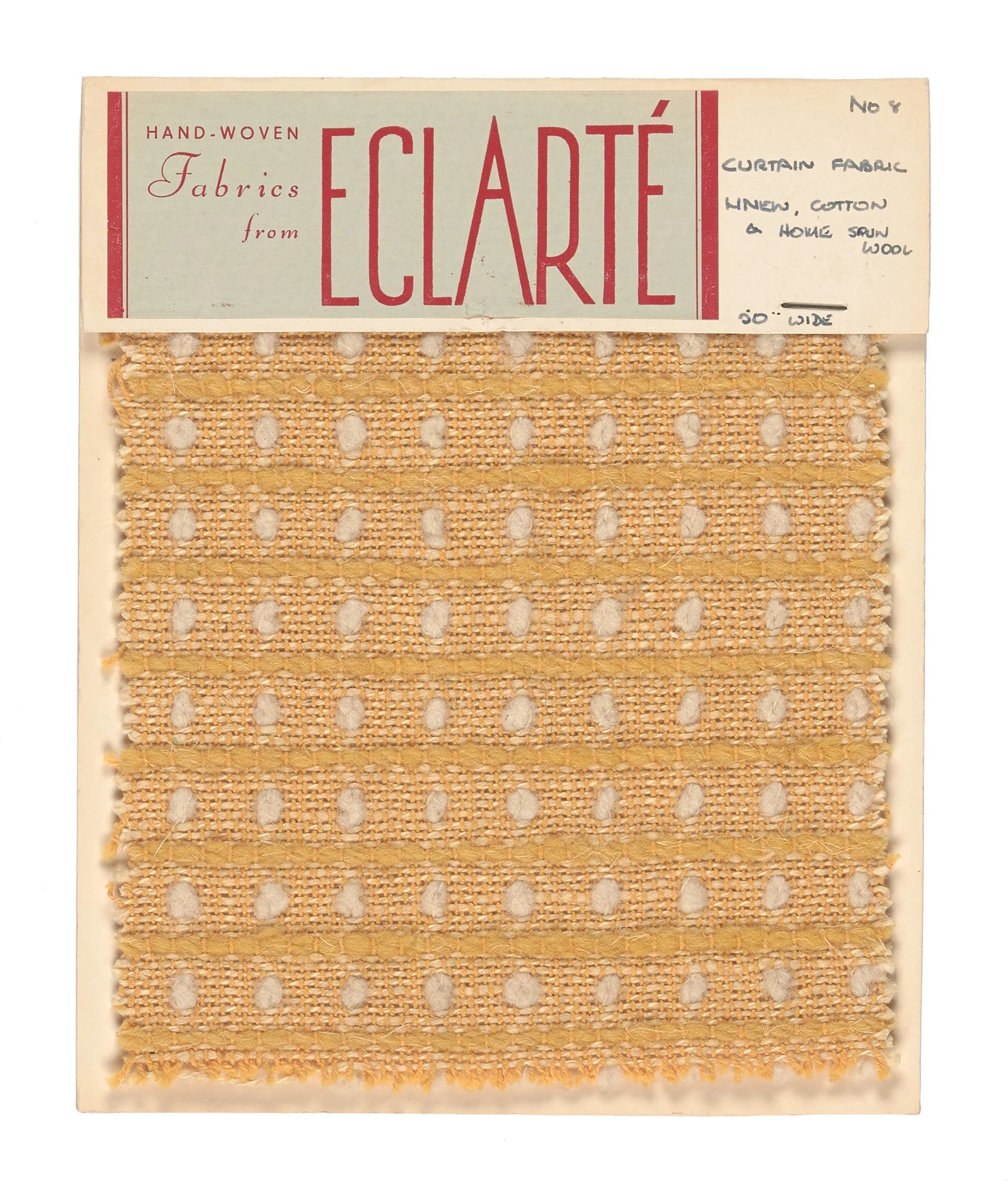

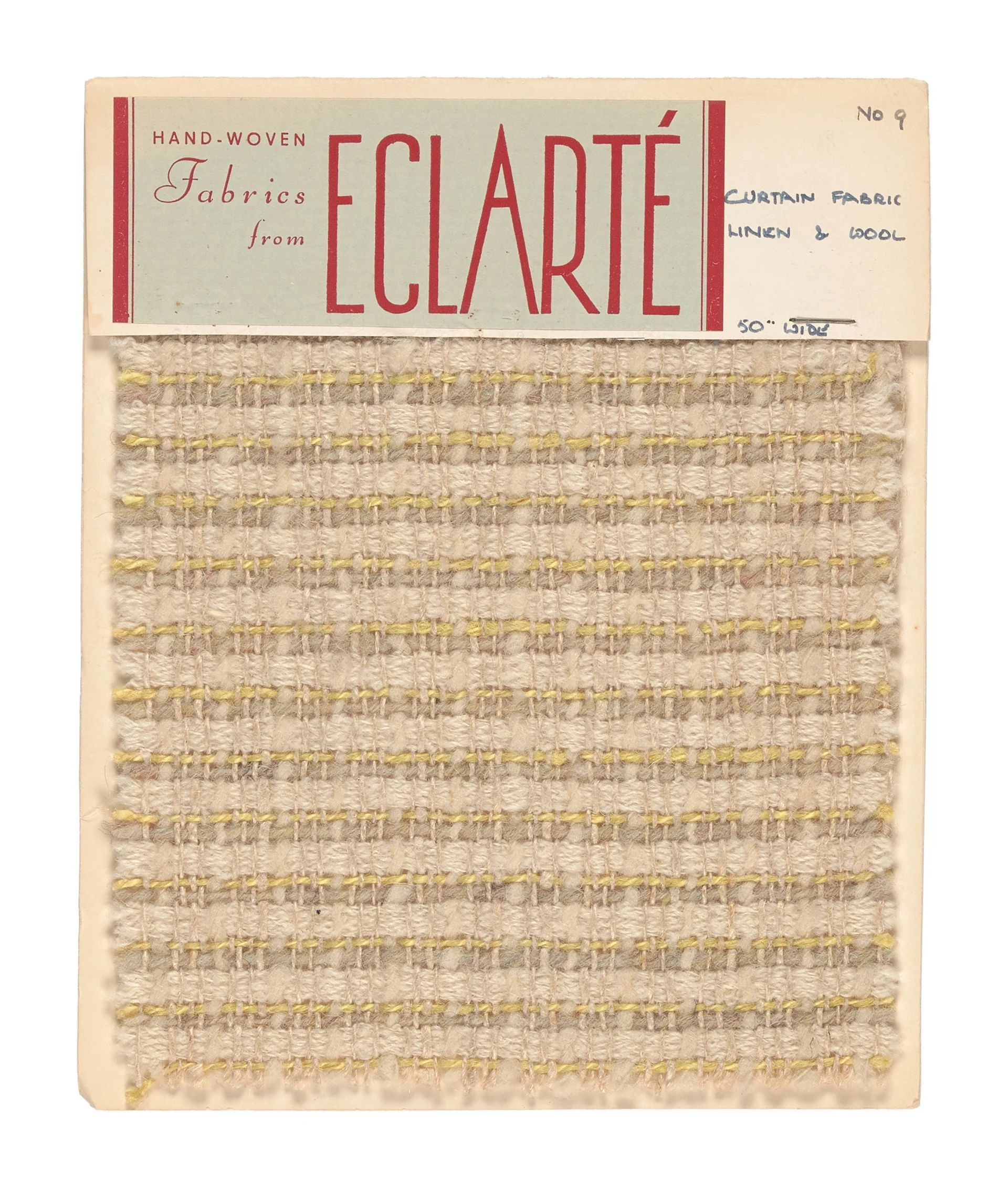

After working out of their Melbourne studio throughout the war years, the eclarté mills in Dandenong were opened by Robert Menzies on 18 December 1951. While many considered weaving a traditionally feminine practice, two-thirds of their factory staff were men. Grove and Hardress worked hard to make their company a joyful and nice place to work. Rather than just employing workers, the eclarte philosophy was "A man who works with his hands is a labourer, a man who works with his hands and his brain is a craftsman, but a man who works with his hands and his brain and his heart is an artist." They trained their community of artisans in all aspects of the work so they could perform a variety of tasks and not be bored.

With the war period behind them, eclarté took on commissions developing furnishing fabrics for building projects, putting them in contact with such notable architects of the time as Robin Boyd, Roy Grounds, and Stephenson & Turner. Among their significant commissions were upholstery for the Australian Academy of Science building in Canberra, curtains for the Prime Minister's Suite at Parliament House, and curtains and divan covers for the University of Melbourne. Despite their glowing reputation and quality product, competition from big industry led to them downgrading their factory and moving to convert an old flour mill in Heathcote.
