= Heathcote, Victoria =

Heathcote
- Town
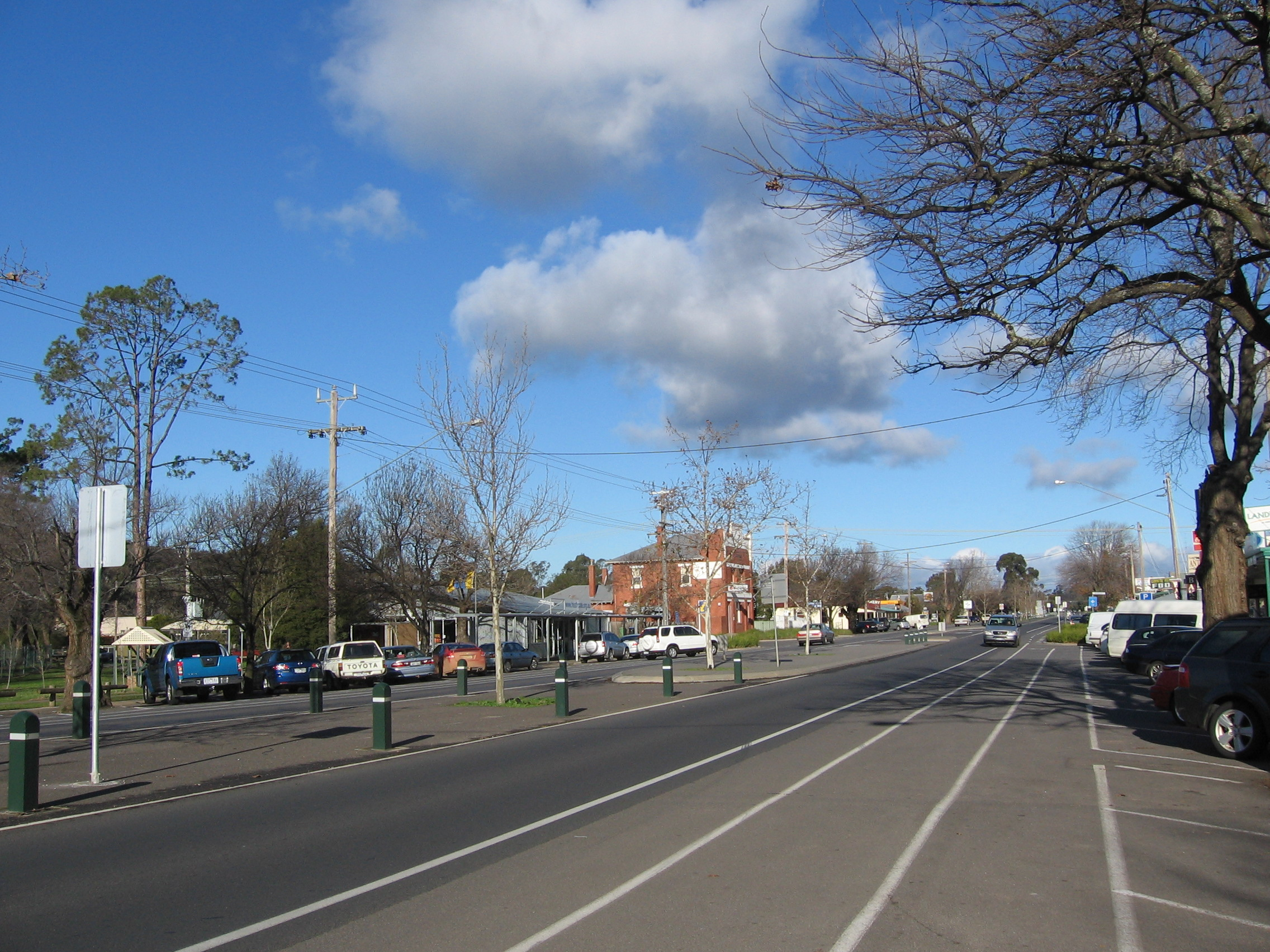
- Main street

- Interactive map of Heathcote
- Coordinates: 36°55′S 144°42′E
- Country: Australia
- State: Victoria
- City: Bendigo
- LGA: City of Greater Bendigo
- Location: 109 km (68 mi) from Melbourne; 47 km (29 mi) from Bendigo

Government
  - State electorate: Euroa
  - Federal division: Bendigo

Population
  - Total: 2,962 (2021 census)
- Postcode: 3523

Heathcote (/ˈhiːθkət/) is a town in central Victoria, Australia, situated on the Northern Highway 110 kilometres north of Melbourne and 40 kilometres south-east of Bendigo via the McIvor Highway. Heathcote's local government area is the City of Greater Bendigo, and it is part of the federal electorate of Bendigo and the state electorate of Euroa. At the 2021 census, Heathcote had a population of 2,962, while the estimated resident population of the wider region in 2024 was 5,329.

== History ==
The Heathcote region is located on the traditional lands of the Taungurung people, a part of the Kulin nation that inhabited a large portion of central Victoria. The first European known to have visited the district was Major Thomas Mitchell in 1836. By 1851, about 400 Europeans lived on some 16 pastoral properties in the area.

Late in 1852, gold was discovered at McIvor Creek. Within six months, some 40,000 miners were camped in the vicinity. It proved to be one of the richest finds during the Australian gold rushes, but the gold was so easily found that it was soon largely exhausted, and by the end of the year, a large proportion of the miners had already left for other recent finds (although deeper deposits continued to be mined for many years). This was not before the Victorian government gazetted the township of Heathcote on the site and ordered the construction of several official buildings. The post office opened on 1 July 1853 as McIvor Creek, but six months later, on 1 January 1854, it was renamed Heathcote. With the decline of gold mining, the region took on an increased importance as a pastoral district.

=== Gold escort robbery ===
Mia Mia was the location of a violent gold escort robbery on 20 July 1853. A gang of at least six robbers and possibly as many as fourteen bailed up a gold escort that departed Heathcote on the way to Kyneton. The robbers opened fire on the six escorts, four of whom were wounded. The other two fled to Heathcote to raise the alarm. When help arrived, they found that the robbers and the gold were gone. All the robbers were living in Heathcote at the time, working the gold diggings. Later, John Francis gave crown evidence against the others and three of the villains were hanged in Melbourne on 3 October 1853.

The robbery took place very close to where one of Australia's worst aviation disasters occurred in 1945.

== Tourism ==
Heathcote is the closest major town to the Heathcote-Graytown National Park and Lake Eppalock. The O'Keefe Rail Trail is a 50-kilometre (31 mi) rail trail that connects Heathcote with Bendigo and provides a popular path for cyclists and walkers. Heathcote was served by the Heathcote railway line from 1889 to 1968.

Popular tourist destinations in Heathcote include the Pink Cliffs Geological Reserve, a former gold mining site, and the Valley of the Liquid Ambers, a park and picnic area along the McIvor Creek that is particularly scenic in Autumn due to the changing colour of the leaves.

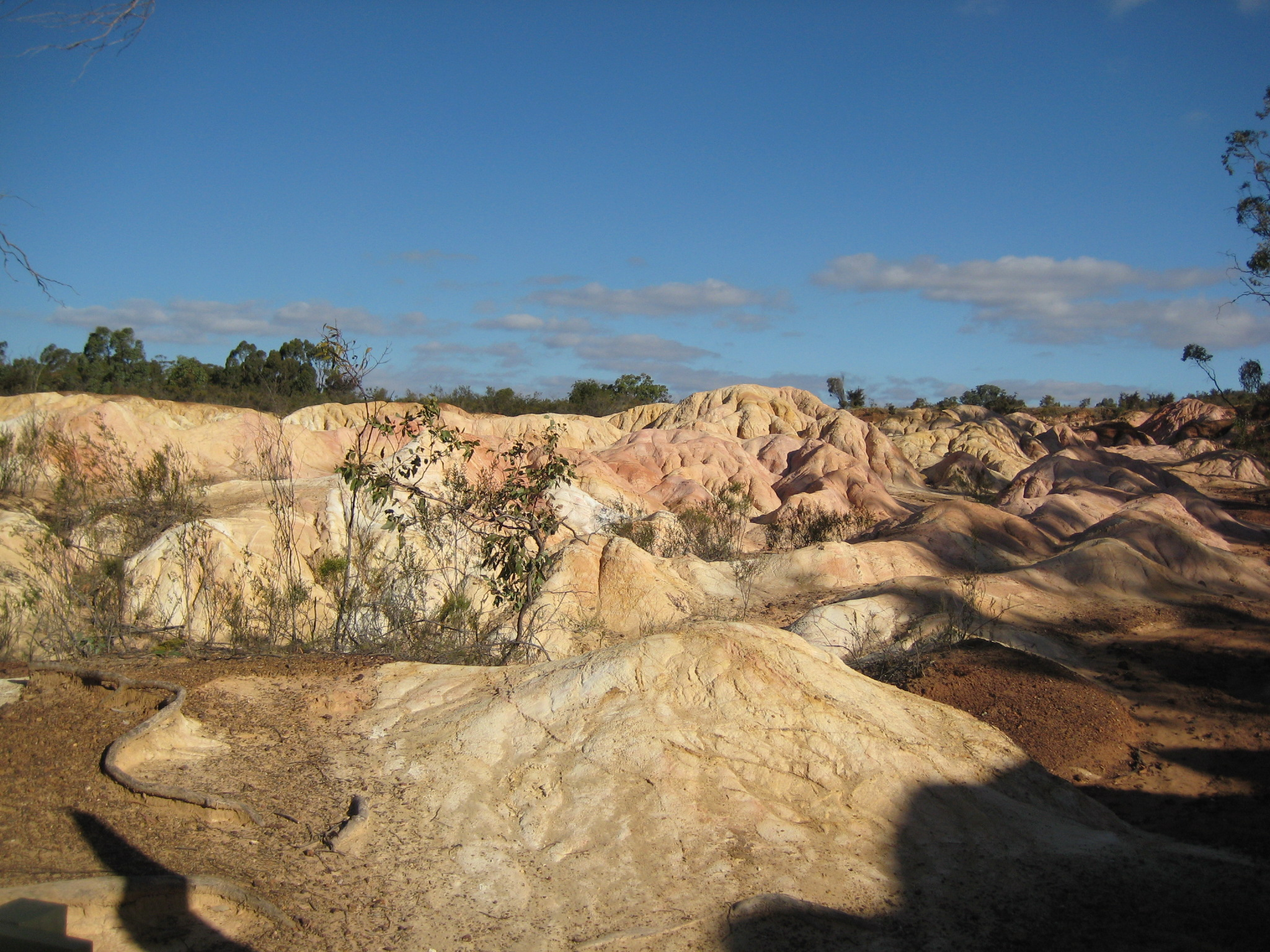
Pink Cliffs Geological Reserve

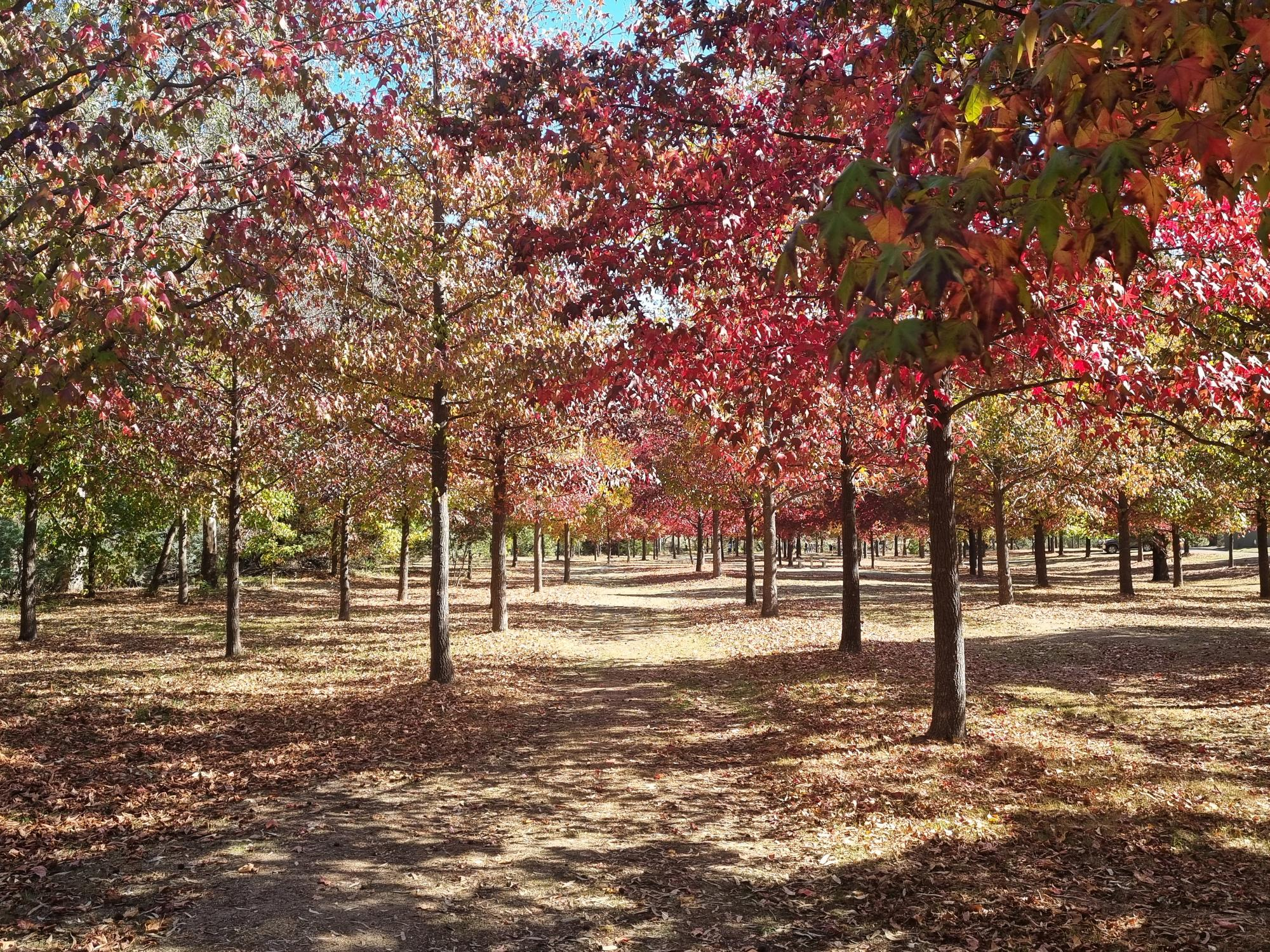
Liquid amber trees in Autumn

Heathcote, as part of the City of Greater Bendigo region, is included as a UNESCO City of Gastronomy. This is part of UNESCO's Creative Cities Network and recognises cities for their culinary heritage, food culture, and sustainable food practices. Designated in 2019, this was a first for Australia.

The heritage-listed sandstone building at 178 High Street was erected in 1854 as an office and family residence for Philip Chauncy, the chief surveyor of the district. It is Heathcote's oldest surviving building. Since 2021, it has been the site of the two-hatted French restaurant, Chauncy, which was awarded the best regional restaurant in 2024 by The Age Good Food Guide.

The town is the centre of the recognised Heathcote wine region, notable for its Shiraz wines. In 2010, the Heathcote Winery won a gold medal at the Queensland Wine Show. Sanguine Estate’s 2012 Inception Shiraz (a.k.a. Estate) was awarded 5 Stars (Gold Medal), best Shiraz in the “$35 to $40” category and equal best Shiraz overall at the 2017 Mainfreight World’s Greatest Syrah & Shiraz Challenge. Wineries from the Heathcote region were among the most acclaimed at the 2016 Victorian Wine Show.

== Culture and events ==
The Heathcote Film Festival is an annual short film festival that has been held since 2010.

Heathcote Harvest Festival was officially launched in 2022 and is held in March on the Labour Day Long Weekend. Located on Barrack Reserve in the centre of Heathcote, the festival is a free family and dog-friendly event with live music, a variety of local and regional stalls and food trucks.

On the King's Birthday Long Weekend in June, Heathcote on Show features local artisan winemakers, brewers, distillers, gourmet food and live musicians at over 25 locations.

The Heathcote Wine and Food Festival is held on a weekend early in October at the Heathcote Showgrounds. Hosted by the Heathcote Winegrowers Association, and running for more than 16 years, the festival includes over forty wine vendors, thirty other vendors, and attracts more than 2500 attendees each year.

The Heathcote Agricultural Show is held at the Heathcote Showground each year in November on Melbourne Cup Day.

== Community groups ==
Heathcote is host to many community and service groups, including: two branches of the Country Women's Association, the Lions Club, the Returned and Services League of Australia, U3A, the Heathcote Masonic Centre, a Men's Shed and Heathcote Artists.

The town is also well-resourced by Heathcote Health services, two primary schools, a library, the Heathcote Visitor Centre, and the Heathcote Community House.

Works on a new Heathcote Community Hub redevelopment commenced in October 2025. This new development incorporates the refurbishment and expansion of the existing Victorian Heritage Register-listed Municipal Office, and the former Court House building, which closed on 1 January 1990.

== Sports and activities ==
- Heathcote Bowling Club: Two synthetic greens cater for year-round play at all levels, and the club hosts a variety of events.
- Heathcote Football Netball Club: Both sports use the facilities at the Barrack Recreation Reserve.
- Australian Rules: The town has an Australian Rules football team playing in the Heathcote District Football League. Heathcote managed to capture back-to-back premierships in 2009/10.
- Cricket: The Heathcote Cricket Club competes in the Northern United Cricket Association and had back-to-back premiership success in seasons 2012/13 & 2013/14.
- Heathcote Tennis Club runs regular social sessions and opportunities for all experience levels.
- Golf: Golfers play at the Heathcote Golf Course, an 18-hole course.
- Motor Racing/Athletics & Horse Racing: Heathcote has a harness track (2040m) that also acts as a speedway.
- The O'Keefe Challenge is an annual event that has been held since 2015. It includes fun runs, cycling, walking and community activities. The O'Keefe Rail Trail Marathon follows the rail trail between Heathcote and Bendigo.
- The town also has a seasonally-operated swimming pool and a skate park.

== Notable residents ==
- Isobel Morphy-Walsh – Indigenous Australian artist who created the Acknowledgement of Country Shadow Sculpture that was installed at Barrack Reserve in Heathcote in 2022.
- Leonard French – Australian artist, known principally for major stained glass works, including a ceiling for the great hall at the National Gallery of Victoria in Melbourne.
- Mollie Grove and Catherine Hardess - Weavers, artists and textile designers who operated their business from old flour mill in Heathcote.
- Susie Marcroft – Australian ceramicist and sculptor who owned Mudwood Studio and edited Creative Heathcote.
- Australian rules footballers – Charlie Norris, Jim Schellnack, Dick Welch, Peter Francis
- Subzero (horse) – Thoroughbred racehorse that won the Melbourne Cup in 1992.
