= Catherine Hardess =

Australian weaver, artist and designer (1889–1970)

Catherine Hard(r)ess
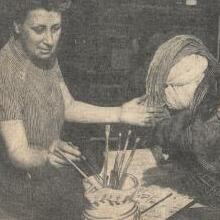
- Born: 18 November 1889; Flemington
- Died: 4 October 1970 (aged 80); Lower Plenty
- Occupation: Designer
- Employer: Slade School of Fine Art
- Partner: Mollie Grove

Catherine Hardess became Catherine Hardress (18 November 1889 – 4 October 1970) was an Australian weaver, artist and designer. She and her partner, Mollie Grove, created a company and a factory that produced hand woven fabric.

== Life ==
Hardess was born in Flemington, Victoria. Her parents were Ann Emma (born Taylor) and her husband George Henry Hardess, who was a teacher. They, like her, had been born in Melbourne. She was educated in Australia and later at the Slade School of Fine Art.

Hardess was employed at the girls' school at Swinburne Technical College in 1919 while J. R. Tranthim-Fryer was the director. She taught fine art and her students included Mollie Grove, Dorothea Francis, and Mary Macqueen. She was allowed leave in 1934 to go to England. She had been given unpaid leave previously to study at the Slade School of Art in 1923 but this time she never returned.

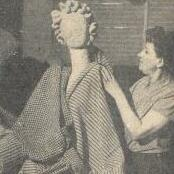
Edith Mollie Grove in 1940, with their fabrics at their exhibition

In the 1930s she was working with Thomas Osborne Robinson who was the decor and costume designer at the Northampton Repertory Theatre. Osborne Robinson later designed the costumes for Laurence Olivier to play Hamlet at the Old Vic. Hardess became the designer at Tunbridge's repertory theatre. She was joined by her former student Edith 'Mollie' Grove in 1935 who became her life partner. Grove was twenty years younger than her and she studied at the Central School of Arts and Crafts and she discovered that she wanted to weave. They shared a studio until in 1939 they took a long journey back to Australia looking at craft and teaching facilities in Finland, Russia, Poland and Greece.

They created a company which they called eclarte and in March 1940 they took their woven goods to the Hotel Australia in Melbourne where they staged an exhibition. The exhibition was opened by the then Prime Minister Robert Menzies. Ecarte took on ten staff and at its height there were 35 employees. Menzies returned in December 1951 to open their new factory in Dandenong. The factory was created by re-using hospital units from the war. Their factory was creating textiles using hand looms. Hardess was the managing director who created the designs and Grove was in charge of production.

By 1954 the company was succeeding and Hardess had formally changed her name to Hardress. All of the staff were said to have been involved in creating a rug to keep Elizabeth II's knees warm on board her aircraft as she flew around Australia that year. 1957 saw a move to a smaller building in Heathcote, Victoria. They had looked at British weaving and the company was now customising designs of furnishing fabric for leading architects and prestigious locations - sometimes using power looms. The company ended in 1962. Hardess died in 1970 in the Melbourne suburb of Lower Plenty.
