= Jim Schellnack =

Australian rules footballer

Personal information
- Full name: James Schellnack
- Born: abt 1880; Heathcote, Victoria
- Died: 24 May 1968 (aged 88); Parkville, Victoria

Playing career
| Years | Club | Games (Goals) |
| 1899–1903 | Brunswick (VFA) | 50 (8) |
| 1904 | South Melbourne | 7 (6) |

James Schellnack (Note: Also spelled Shellnack in some sources.) (c. 1880 – 24 May 1968) was an Australian rules footballer who played seven games for South Melbourne during the 1904 VFL season.

== Family ==
The son of Charles Frederick Schellnack (1831–1889), and Catherine Schellnack (1837–1922), née McDonald. James Schellnack (a.k.a. Shellnack) was born at Heathcote, Victoria in c.1880.

== Football ==
=== Brunswick (VFA) ===
He played in 54 matches over five seasons (1899–1903) for the VFA Brunswick Football Club; and, on 8 August 1903, played in a team, against Essendon Town, at the Brunswick Oval, that also included a 17-year old John Curtin, the future Prime Minister of Australia, on the half-forward flank.

=== South Melbourne (VFL) ===
Cleared from Brunswick to South Melbourne in June 1904,

== Death ==
He died at Parkville, Victoria on 24 May 1968.
