= Susie Marcroft =

Australian artist

- Born: Susan Marcroft
- Occupations: Visual artist, sculptor, graphic designer

Susie Marcroft is an Australian artist who mainly works as an installation artist and sculptor. She opened her own gallery, Mudwood Studio, initially in Kyogle, New South Wales, before relocating to Heathcote, Victoria. Her works have been exhibited in group and solo exhibitions, with research associated with her solo exhibition leading to a peer-reviewed publication.

== Biography ==
Marcroft grew up in Mt Macedon, Victoria. She had a long career in graphic design before completing a Bachelor of Visual Arts Honours at Southern Cross University, and then focusing on her sculptural practice, using clay as her primary medium. The work of Beth Cavener has been a source of inspiration for her own practice, which Marcroft says is driven by "perceptual responses to the natural world, memories and being with animals".

Her 2015 solo exhibition, Strange Little Attractors, was held at the Northern Rivers Community Gallery in Ballina, New South Wales. The gallery notes that the exhibition explored "how quantum consciousness might be engaged as a creative strategy in eliciting empathetic responses to the artists’ sculptural ‘merges’ of human and non-human animals."

In 2016, Marcroft established her first gallery, Mudwood Studio, in Kyogle, in northern New South Wales. After deciding to return home to central Victoria, she relocated her Mudwood Studio gallery to a shop on the main street in Heathcote, Victoria, in 2018. Mudwood Studio hosted regular exhibitions and showcased Marcroft's own work and that of other local and regional artists. The gallery was included in a publication produced by the Bendigo City Council, Creative Spaces in Greater Bendigo, in 2021. Marcroft's work has also been sold through the Los Angeles-based online art gallery, Saatchi Art.

Marcroft worked with local artists to publish Kyogle Culture Magazine, an arts and events book to attract tourists to the Kyogle region. The magazine was initially founded by Marcroft in 2016 in conjunction with members of the local Chamber of Commerce. Together, they published the first three issues.

In 2024, Marcroft produced and edited Creative Heathcote, a book profiling thirty-six artists associated with the Heathcote region, including community groups and venues that support local arts initiatives. Marcroft was commissioned by the City of Greater Bendigo's Creative Communities team to produce this book, which profiled visual artists, writers, poets, musicians, performers and film creatives.

== Select Exhibitions ==
Solo

- 'Strange Little Attractors', Northern Rivers Community Gallery, Ballina, New South Wales (October 2015)

Group Exhibitions

- June 2017 - 'Sharehouse', Byron School of Art – Project Space, Mullumbimby
- July 2016 - 'A Touch of Whimsy', Bankhouse Originals, Mallanganee, Northern NSW
- July 2015 - 'Creaturely Feelings', Dax Centre, Melbourne University
- June 2015 - Toorak Village Sculpture Prize
- November 2014 - Arts Northern Rivers, Travelling Popup Exhibition (Kyogle)
- December 2013 - Vice Chancellor's Exhibition, Southern Cross University
- November 2013 - Women's Work(s), The Channon Gallery, The Channon, New South Wales

== Publications ==
- Creative Heathcote: showcasing Heathcote creatives living in the heartland of Victoria, July 2024.
- Marcroft, Susie. “Strange Little Attractors.” Sloth: A Journal of Emerging Voices in Human-Animal Studies Volume 3, No. 1, 2017.
