= Valley of the Liquid Ambers =

Park and picnic area in Heathcote, Victoria, Australia

Coordinates: 36.926375°S 144.713945°E

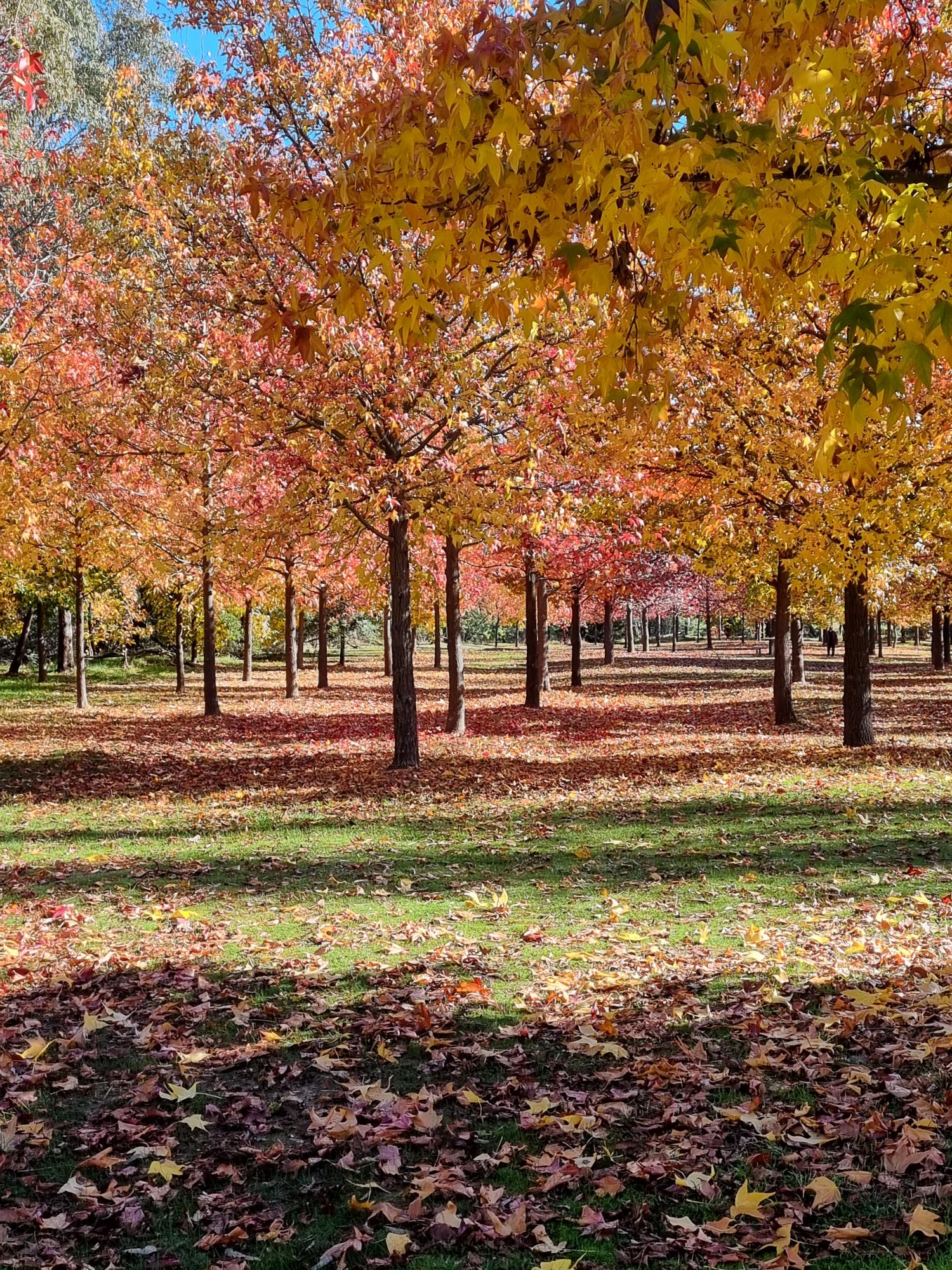
Park and picnic area in Heathcote, Victoria

The Valley of the Liquid Ambers is a park and picnic area, close to the centre of town in Heathcote, Victoria. It is located along the McIvor Creek, approximately 100 kilometres (62 mi) north of Melbourne.

== History of the park ==
The park was opened on the 19th September 1971 with support from the Heathcote Tourist Promotion Committee. Its establishment involved the planting of Liquidambar trees by local residents. Each tree had a plaque attached as a lasting memorial for future generations.

The precise details about who planted the trees and when remain unclear, although signage in the area records it as an Apex Plantation.

In the December 1971 issue of Walkabout: Australia's Travel and Leisure Magazine, the Victorian Ministry of Tourism refers to Heathcote having married tourism, with liquid amber trees being fostered, varied local timbers being incorporated into a unique timber cabin, the National Trust classified old sandstone powder magazine being restored to goldfields days condition, and short walking tracks developed to Devil's Cave and Pink Rocks.

On 28 April 2002, a plaque was installed at the park to commemorate the re-dedication of the Valley of the Liquid Ambers by Mr. Ben Hardman, M.P., Member for Seymour. The plaque notes that, "Many plaques and names have been lost to time, but the trees still stand. This plaque honours these people."

=== Images ===
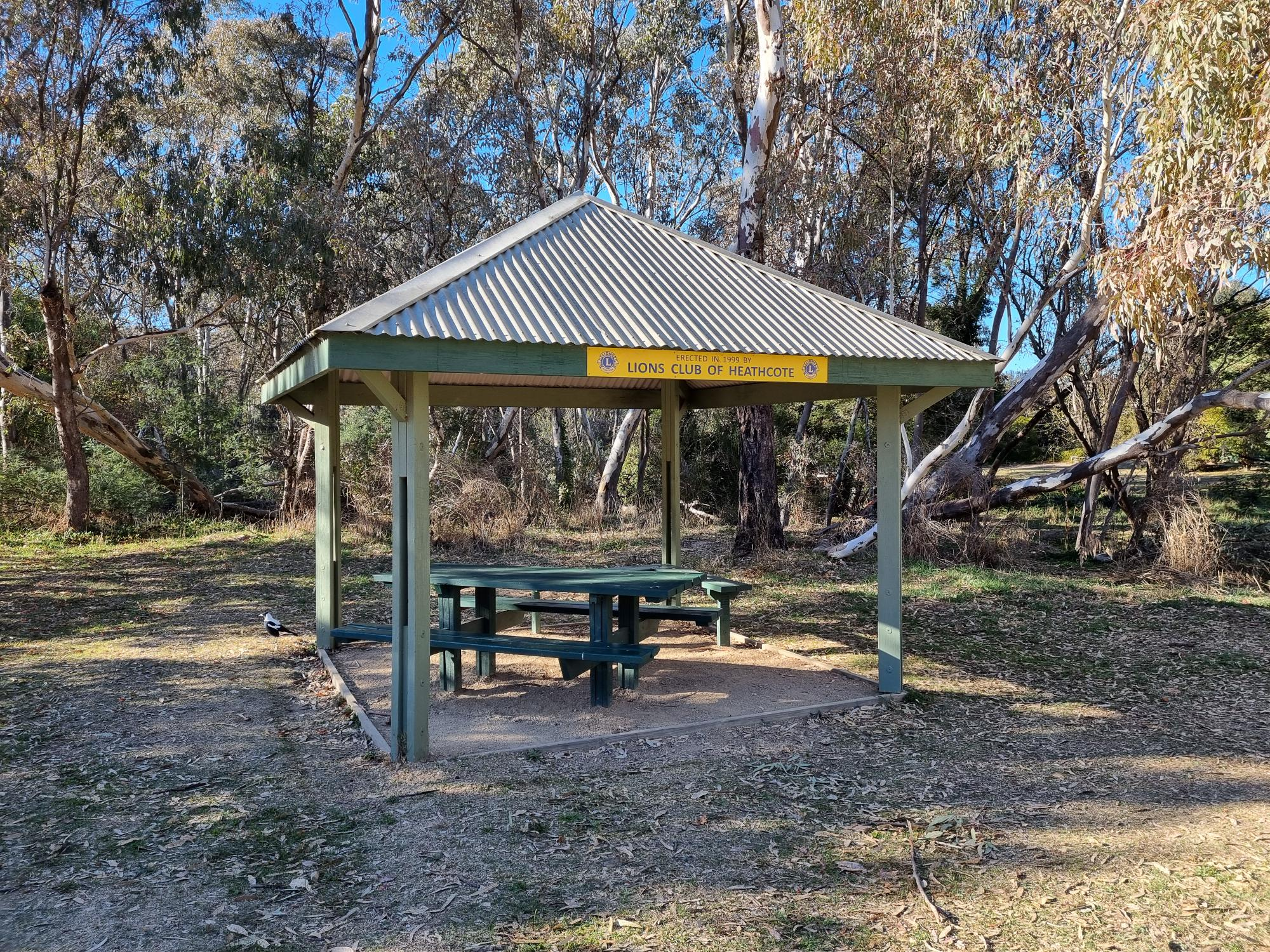
Rotunda erected by the Heathcote Lions Club

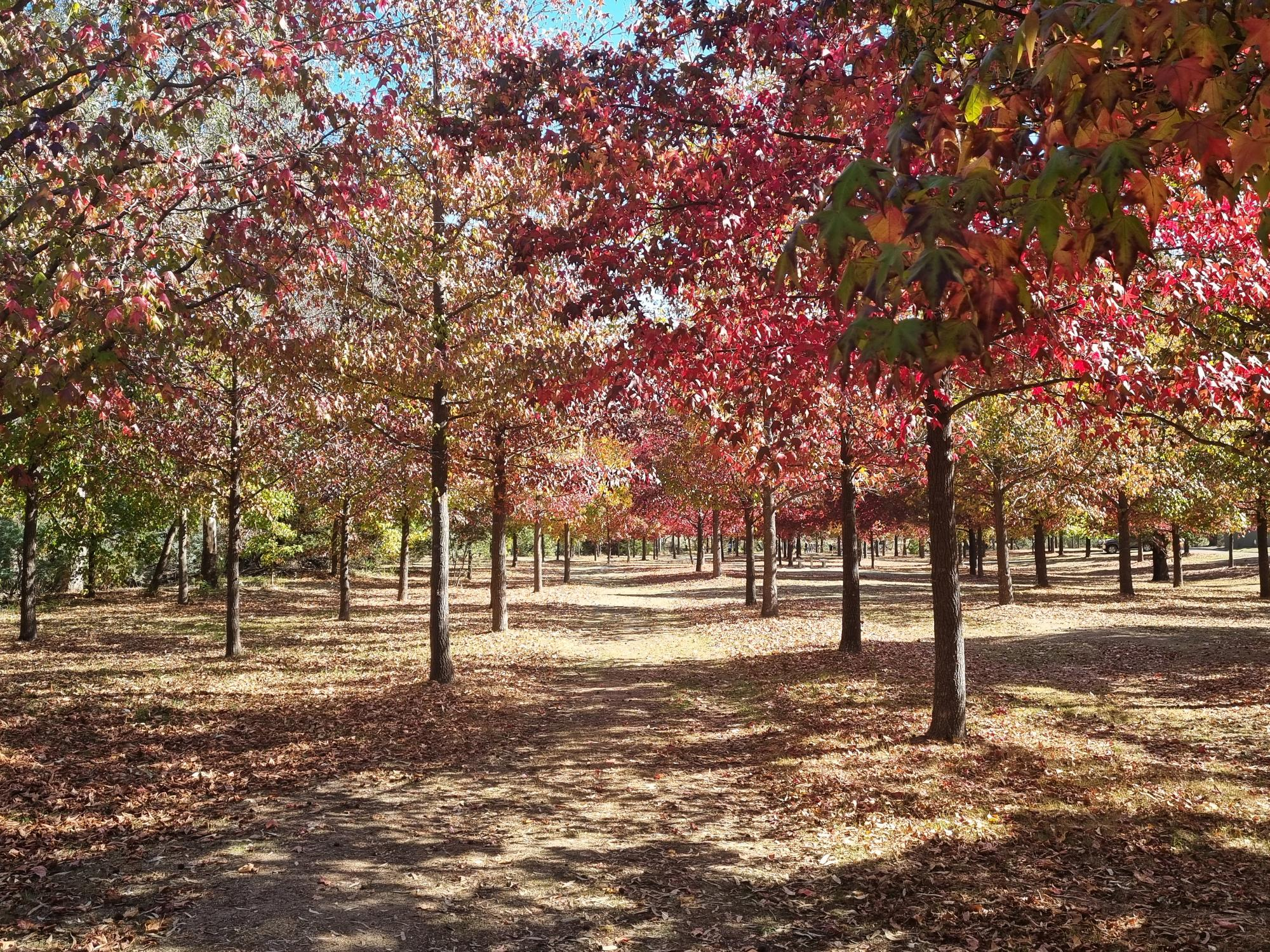
Liquid amber trees in Autumn

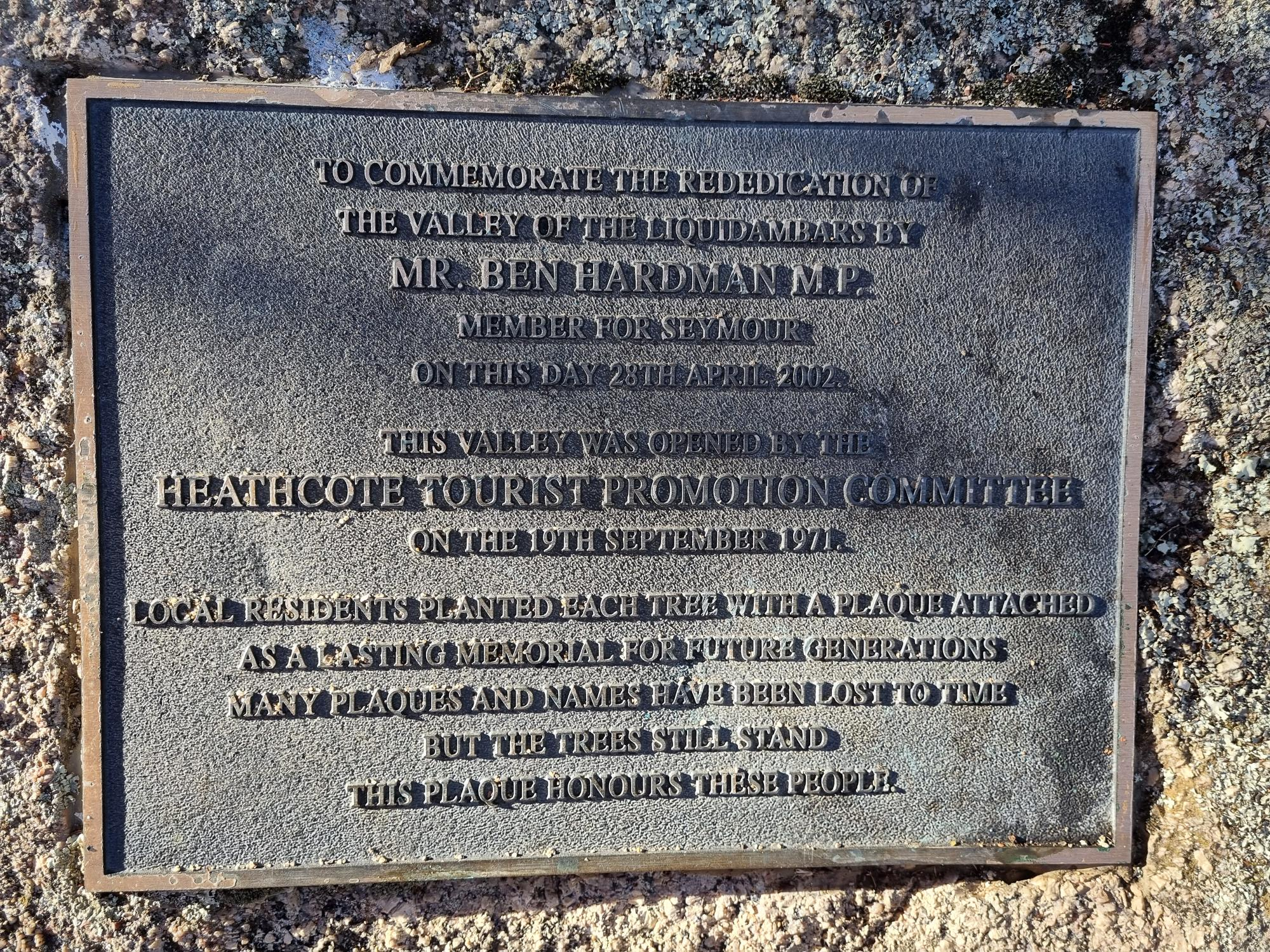
Commemorative plaque at Valley of Liquid Ambers

== Tourism ==
The Valley of Liquid Ambers is promoted as one of the main attractions of Heathcote and the wider City of Greater Bendigo and is a popular tourist destination for visitors to the region. The park is a popular picnic spot with several tables available and a rotunda erected by the Heathcote Lions Club in 1999. At one end of the park is a swing bridge that takes you across the McIvor Creek and back into town.

It is known as one of the most scenic places to visit in Victoria in Autumn when the leaves are particularly impressive.
