= Isobel Morphy-Walsh =

Indigenous Australian artist

- Born: Isobel Morphy-Walsh; 1963 (age 62–63)
- Occupations: Visual artist, weaver, storyteller
- Notable work: Acknowledgement of Country Shadow Sculpture
- Father: Uncle Larry Walsh

Isobel Morphy-Walsh is an Indigenous Australian artist, weaver, and storyteller. Her work focuses on First Nations narratives, and she has received several notable commissions, grants, and awards throughout her career.

== Biography ==
Morphy-Walsh is described as "a proud Nirim Baluk woman from the Taun Wurrung (Taungurung) people." She is a multi-disciplinary artist and storyteller who uses different mediums and formats to weave stories into both performance and visual art. She is also a weaver, curator, producer, activist, and educator who has spent much of her life working with her community. Her work has a strong and deliberate focus on First Nations narratives, protecting and promoting Indigenous peoples and language, and emphasising the significance of history, culture, and country. She comes from a family of storytellers and weavers, and some of her work has involved family collaborations, including with her father Uncle Larry Walsh, who was part of the Stolen Generation. Morphy-Walsh is a Board member of the Taungurung Land and Waters Council (TLaWC), the corporate representative body of the Taungurung people. In July 2024, Morphy-Walsh was included in Creative Heathcote, a booklet showcasing the work of creatives living in the Heathcote region.

Morphy-Walsh has worked for museums and galleries, engaging in curatorial work that focuses on Victorian First Nations cultures, communities, histories, art, expressions, stories, and engagement. She supports the need to decolonise cultural heritage institutions, particularly through the treatment and interpretation of artworks, objects, and images, histories and narratives, with a focus on the communities they come from, and approaches taken in development. Isobel embeds the values of her culture and ancestors in all that she does.

== Career ==
In 2021, Morphy-Walsh was appointed as the First Nations curator at Bendigo Art Gallery. Her role included conducting an audit on the gallery's collection and leading tours that highlighted works by Indigenous artists. In 2021, she also joined the Board of Management of National Exhibitions Touring Support (NETS) Australia. This is the national network committed to the delivery of best practice touring exhibitions of contemporary visual culture to remote and metropolitan communities throughout Australia.

Morphy-Walsh is a member of the artistic team that helps to shape the artistic vision of the Melbourne Theatre Company (MTC), and works to champion future Australian theatre-makers.

In April 2024, Morphy-Walsh was announced as one of the Wheeler Centre's Hot Desk Fellows, a fellowship program intended to ‘provide emerging writers with a space to inspire their process and build a creative community’. Morphy-Walsh was the Just Pretending Playwright Fellow for ‘Thudagun’s Lost Stolen Children’ (play). The play "will examine how creation mythology and lived experience intersect. This play uses DhunagWurrunng (Taungurung) creation story about Thudagun – an old witch/women who steals children as a frame to discuss the effect of the Stolen Generation though the lens of intergenerational trauma. The writers father Uncle Larry Walsh and the writer recently gave testimony to the Yoorrook Justice Commission about Uncle Larry’s lived experience being Stolen and the effect of intergenerational trauma that is carried down the family lives as a result."

Morphy-Walsh is a contributor to Blak & Bright's Black Stories Hub, an initiative that is supported by the Australian Government through Creative Australia. Blak & Bright is Australia's leading organisation for presenting and promoting First Nations literary voices, through festivals and other events. Her reading, Truth Telling and Treaty, was delivered on 15 June 2024.

== Selected works ==
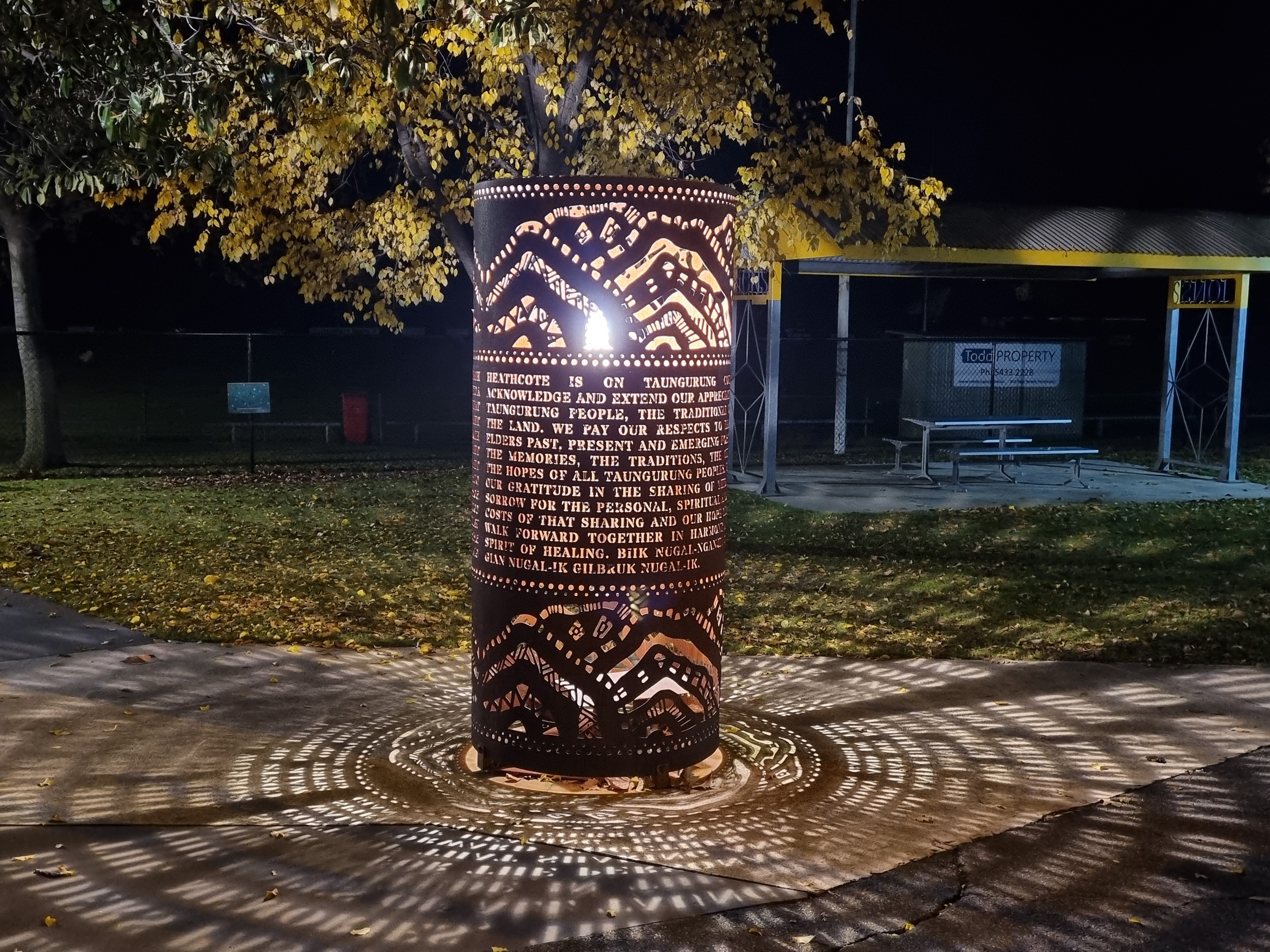
The Shadow Sculpture at night

- Acknowledgement of Country Shadow Sculpture - This work is on prominent public display. It was installed at Barrack Reserve on High Street in Heathcote in 2022, where it is lit up every evening from 6pm. The shadows and imagery create a dramatic effect on the ground and illuminate the words of the Acknowledgement of Country. The City of Greater Bendigo, in consultation with TLaWC and Morphy-Walsh worked together to commission and create the piece. When creating the sculpture, Morphy-Walsh, was inspired by the WAH, crow’s view of Mount Camel, and the mountain range in the area. The artwork emphasises the protection that the mountains give and provides a moment of reflection. The TLaWC Community Engagement Coordinator, Aunty Joanne Honeysett, said, “The sculpture recognises and acknowledges Traditional Owners and I hope having the artwork displayed will prompt conversations in the community about our shared histories and cultures, and how we can all play our part in achieving reconciliation.”
- Gunga-na Dhum-nganjinu (The Stories we Hold Tightly) - Morphy-Walsh's first production was a live performance commissioned by Yirramboi Festival and received development funding and support from Yirramboi Festival, City of Melbourne, and Creative Victoria through the Creative Projects Fund. Presented in May 2023 at Yirramboi Festival, it used the combined skills of Morphy-Walsh and several family members in the weaving together of song, storytelling, and movement.l. The production examined the creation stories and myths that make us who we are. A stationary observation exhibit was part of this production. Morphy-Walsh and her co-writers received the Victorian Green Room Award for Writing: Theatre - Independent in 2024 for this production.
- Gunawarra: Re-creation - Morphy-Walsh was commissioned by Ilbijerri to write this work which was her first solo play. It was performed by the Ilbijerri Theatre Company at Southbank's Lawler Theatre in Melbourne in late 2024. This play is a contemporary creation work based on passed down Taungurung stories that have been passed down, and was part of Ilbijerri and MTC's presentation of Blak in the Room. It looks at the continuation of creation and the stories of Blak women healing.
