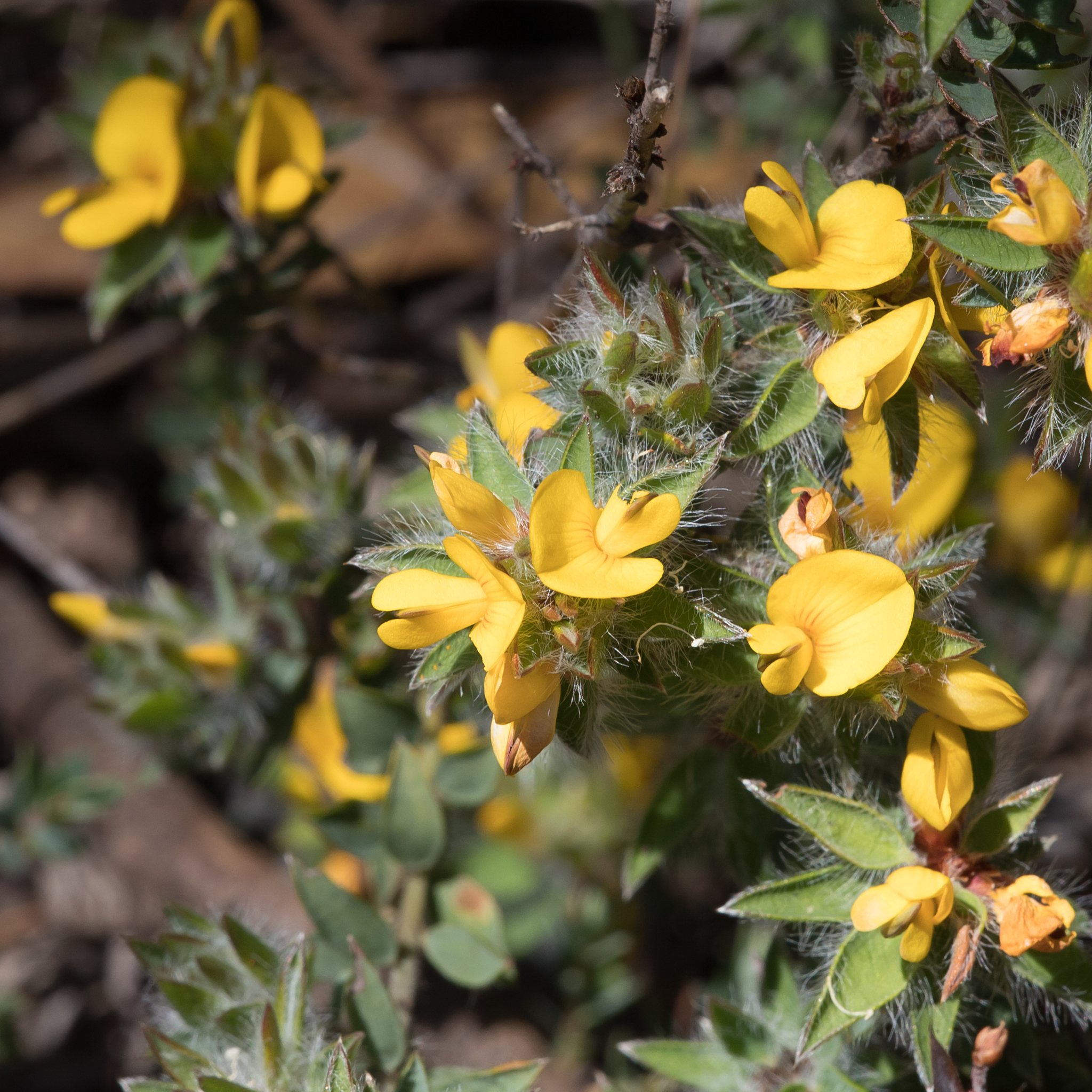
- Pultenaea trinervis in Cox Scrub Conservation Park

Scientific classification
- Kingdom: Plantae
- Clade: Tracheophytes
- Clade: Angiosperms
- Clade: Eudicots
- Clade: Rosids
- Order: Fabales
- Family: Fabaceae
- Subfamily: Faboideae
- Genus: Pultenaea
- Species: P. trinervis

Binomial name
- Pultenaea trinervis J.M.Black

= Pultenaea trinervis =

Three-nerved bush-pea

Species of plant

Pultenaea trinervis, commonly known as three-nerved bush-pea, is a species of flowering plant in the family Fabaceae and is endemic to the south-east of South Australia. It is a low, prostrate to erect shrub with hairy, elliptic to lance-shaped leaves and yellow to orange and red, pea-like flowers.

== Description ==
Pultenaea trinervis is an erect to prostrate shrub that typically grows to a height of 15–50 m (49–164 ft) and has branches that are hairy at first. The leaves are arranged alternately, elliptic to lance-shaped, mostly 6.8–13.5 mm (0.27–0.53 in) long, 2–4 mm (0.079–0.157 in) wide with egg-shaped stipules 1.8–3.5 mm (0.071–0.138 in) long at the base. The edges of the leaves have long hairs and the lower surface is softly-hairy with three veins visible. The flowers are 6–8 mm (0.24–0.31 in) long and arranged in small, leafy groups near the ends of branchlets. The sepals are 3–4 mm (0.12–0.16 in) long with triangular lobes and two bracteoles 2.0–3.2 mm (0.079–0.126 in) long at the base of the sepal tube. The standard petal is yellow-orange with red striations and 7–8.5 mm (0.28–0.33 in) long, the wings yellow to orange and about the same length as the standard, and the keel yellowish-green to red and 7.0–7.5 mm (0.28–0.30 in) long. Flowering mainly occurs from September to January and the fruit is an egg-shaped, brown pod 4–5 mm (0.16–0.20 in) long.

== Taxonomy ==
Pultenaea trinervis was first formally described in 1923 by John McConnell Black in the Transactions and proceedings of the Royal Society of South Australia from specimens collected near Port Lincoln. The specific epithet (trinervis) means "three-nerved".

== Distribution and habitat ==
Three-nerved bush-pea grows in heathland and mallee on the Eyre Peninsula, southern Mount Lofty Ranges and Kangaroo Island in South Australia.
