= Philip Chauncy =

Philip Lamothe Snell Chauncy (1816–1880) was a colonial surveyor and amateur ethnographer.

Born on 21 June 1816, at Datchet in Buckinghamshire, England, he travelled to the colonies in Australia, residing in Victoria after 1839 and at the Swan River Colony (Perth, WA) between 1841 and 1853. He was appointed to the position of assistant government surveyor at Swan River. Chauncy interviewed the Indigenous inhabitants on his journeys, recording the names of the places he was documenting and incidental remarks. His reports became a source of ethnographic material for contemporary works such as Robert Brough Smyth's The Aborigines of Victoria (Melbourne 1878), supplying an appendix, 'Notes and Anecdotes of the Aborigines of Australia', along with his other remarks, and later authors of texts regarding Indigenous Australians.

The site of Chauncy Spring in the Shire of Mundaring, which he surveyed in 1847 and recorded by the existing local name 'Jardemin', was gazetted in 1848 at Perth with his name.

He married Susan Augusta Mitchell (1828–1867, daughter of William Mitchell) in 1848.
