= Heathcote-Graytown National Park =

National park in Victoria, Australia

- IUCN category II (national park)
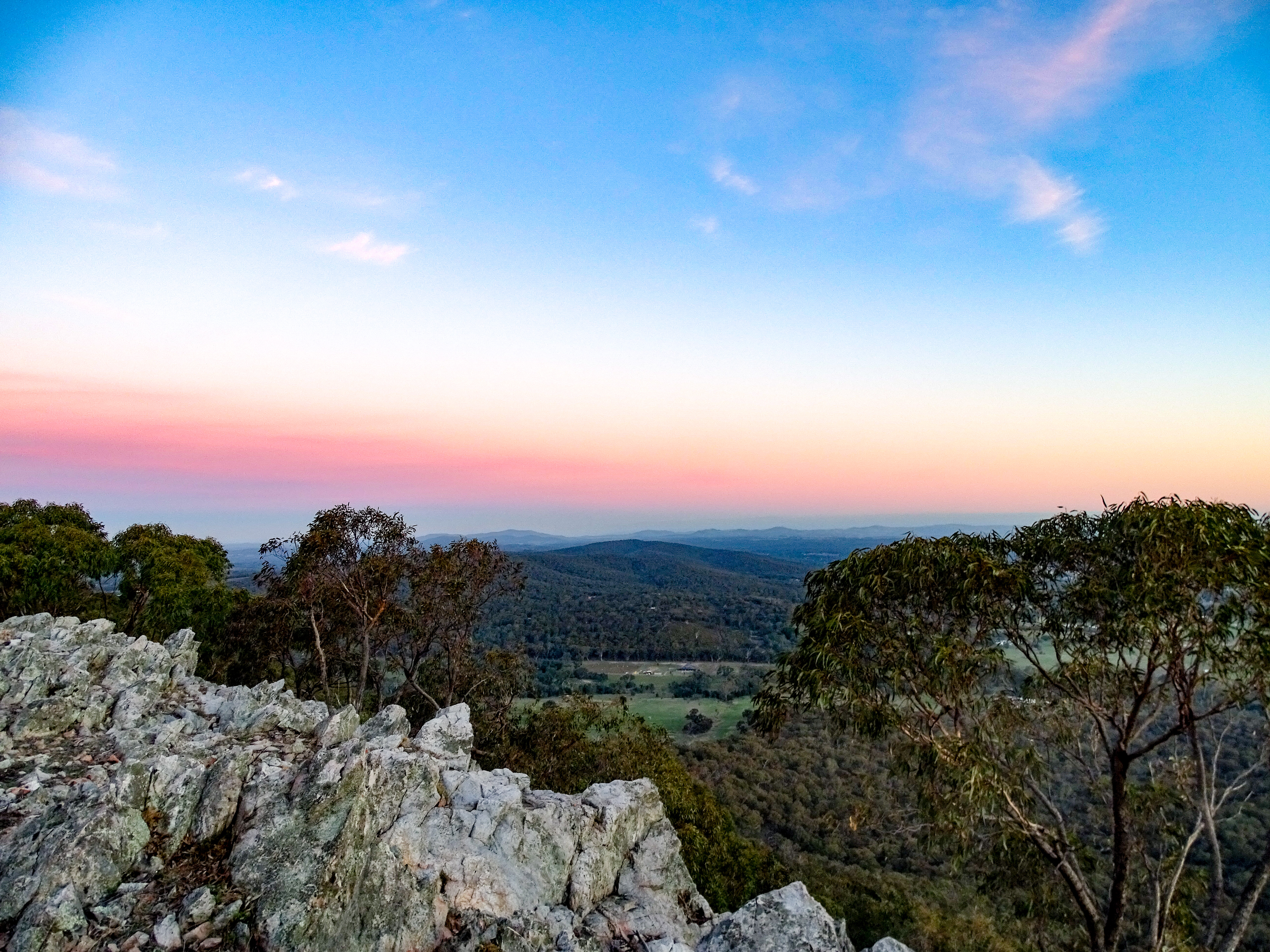
- View from Mt Ida within the National Park

- Location within Victoria
- Location: Victoria
- Nearest city: Heathcote
- Coordinates: 36°47′46.8″S 144°51′58.8″E
- Area: 128.33 km^{2} (49.55 sq mi)
- Established: 30 October 2002
- Governing body: Parks Victoria
- Website: Official website

The Heathcote-Graytown National Park is a national park located in the North Central region of Victoria, Australia. The 12,833-hectare (31,710-acre) national park, which includes sections of the Great Dividing Range, adjoins a number of state forests, including the McIvor Ranges State Forest and is located just outside the town of Heathcote.

The park lies within the Rushworth Box-Ironbark Region Important Bird Area, identified as such by BirdLife International because of its importance for swift parrots and other woodland birds.

The area was gazetted as a national park by the Victorian Government on 30 October 2002. It was primarily proclaimed to protect Victoria's diminishing box-ironbark forests, crucial in retaining Victoria's biodiversity.

== See also ==
- Protected areas of Victoria
- List of national parks of Australia
