= Margaret Georgina Corrick =

Australian botanist

- Born: 11 October 1922; Hobart, Tasmania, Australia
- Died: 12 August 2020 (aged 97); Melbourne, Victoria, Australia
- Education: Friends' School
- Known for: Pultenaea
- Scientific career
- Fields: Botany
- Author abbrev. (botany): Corrick

Margaret Georgina Corrick (11 October 1922 – 12 August 2020) was an Australian botanist. She collected over 10,000 specimens and was an expert on Pultenaea.

== Life ==
Margaret Georgina Corrick was born in Hobart, Tasmania on 11 October 1922. Her parents were members of the Tasmanian Field Naturalists Club and she and her sisters joined as children. She was educated at the Friends' School in Hobart. Before her marriage she worked as a bank clerk, while afterwards she moved with her bank employee husband Bill to Launceston and Leeton. In 1962 they moved to Casterton, where the couple joined the Field Naturalists Club of Victoria (FNCV). A further move was to Hamilton, where Corrick served as secretary of the local branch of the FNCV from 1965 to 1968. Later she served as assistant secretary of the FNCV and, from 1976 to 1978 as president. In 2005 she was made an honorary member.

In a volunteer capacity and with the help of several naturalists, she began compiling a list of the flora of Victoria Range.

Corrick was employed as a technical assistant by the National Herbarium of Victoria from 1975 to 1986, before being promoted to technical officer from 1986 until her retirement in 1987. She was then appointed honorary associate at the Herbarium.

During her career, Corrick collected over 10,000 specimens, of which nearly 6,000 are held in the National Herbarium of Victoria. She was an authority on the genus Pultenaea and published six names, despite being a "self-taught amateur". She collaborated with photographer Bruce Furhrer on two books, Wildflowers of Southern Western Australia (1996) and Wildflowers of Victoria (2000) and assisted him with A Field Guide to Australian Fungi (2005).

The standard author abbreviation Corrick is used to indicate this person as the author when citing a botanical name.

Corrick died on 12 August 2020 in Melbourne, Victoria. She was predeceased by her husband, Bill, and survived by her daughter and three sons, grandchildren and great-grandchildren.

== Works ==
- Corrick, Margaret G.; Fuhrer, Bruce A. (1996). Wildflowers of southern Western Australia. Five Mile Press. ISBN 978-1-875971-49-7.
- Corrick, Margaret G.; Fuhrer, Bruce A. (2000). Wildflowers of Victoria and adjoining areas. Bloomings Books. ISBN 978-1-876473-14-3.
