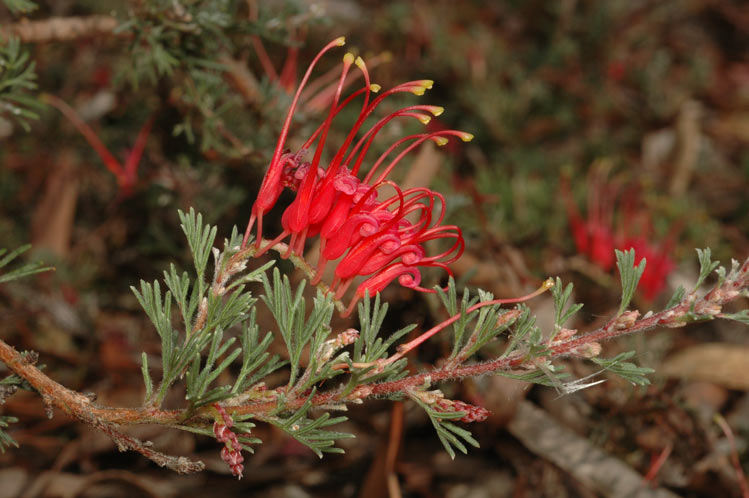
- Grevillea humifusa in the Australian National Botanic Gardens

Conservation status
- Critically Endangered (IUCN 3.1)

- Endangered (EPBC Act)

Scientific classification
- Kingdom: Plantae
- Clade: Embryophytes
- Clade: Tracheophytes
- Clade: Angiosperms
- Clade: Eudicots
- Order: Proteales
- Family: Proteaceae
- Genus: Grevillea
- Species: G. humifusa

Binomial name
- Grevillea humifusa Olde & Marriott

= Grevillea humifusa =

Spreading grevillea

Species of shrub endemic to Western Australia

Grevillea humifusa, commonly known as spreading grevillea, is a species of flowering plant in the family Proteaceae and is endemic to a restricted area of the south-west of Western Australia. It is a prostrate shrub with long, trailing stems, divided leaves with linear lobes and clusters of pink to pale red and cream-coloured flowers with a reddish, yellow-tipped style.

== Description ==
Grevillea humifusa is a prostrate shrub with trailing stems typically up to 3 m (9.8 ft) long, its branchlets with long, soft hairs. Its leaves are divided, 15–20 mm (0.59–0.79 in) long with linear lobes 5–10 mm (0.20–0.39 in) long and about 0.5 mm (0.020 in) wide, the edges rolled under. The flowers are arranged in clusters of twelve to thirty on a silky-to woolly-hairy rachis 8–15 mm (0.31–0.59 in) long. The flowers are pink to pale red and cream-coloured, the style pink, red or orange with a yellow tip, the pistil 22–24 mm (0.87–0.94 in) long. Flowering occurs from September to November and the fruit is an oblong follicle 12–15 mm (0.47–0.59 in) long.

== Taxonomy ==
Grevillea humifusa was first formally described in 1994 by Peter M. Olde and Neil R. Marriott in The Grevillea Book, from specimens collected by Olde near Eneabba in 1991. The specific epithet (humifusa) means "procumbent".

== Distribution and habitat ==
Spreading grevillea is only known from a single population of about 1500 plants near Eneabba, where it grows in disturbed, open low woodland on gravelly loam soils. The tree canopy of this habitat consists of Eucalyptus loxophleba and E. wandoo, while the undergrowth includes species such as Kennedia prostrata, Jacksonia sp. and Dianella revoluta. The land that these plants are found on comprises private pasture and adjoining road reserves. The species is likely endemic to this area, because despite a number of surveys, it has not been discovered elsewhere.

== Ecology ==
Grevillea humifusa is lignotuberous and regenerates after fire. Following fires in the Shire road reserve population in 1995, plants were observed to have regenerated well. Three years afterwards in July 1998, new juvenile plants were found, suggesting fire may be involved in stimulating seed germination.

The pollinator species of G. humifusa are currently unknown, however, a variety of insects such as meat ants, black bull ants and honeybees have been observed on flowers. It is possibly also pollinated by birds, although no birds have been seen feeding on the plant's nectar and pollen during field observations undertaken for research of this species' biology and ecology.

== Conservation ==
Grevillea humifusa is listed as critically endangered on the IUCN Red List of Threatened Species and under the Western Australian Government Biodiversity Conservation Act (2016). It is also listed as endangered under the Australian Government Environment Protection and Biodiversity Conservation Act 1999 and as threatened by the Western Australian Government Department of Biodiversity, Conservation and Attractions.

This species faces a variety of threats, including competition from introduced weeds, grazing and damage from rabbits, inappropriate fire regimes, road and firebreak maintenance activities and lack of available habitat suitable for the species.

Many introduced weeds, such as grasses and clovers occur within the species' distribution in the Shire Road reserve. While adult G. humifusa plants appear to be able to successfully compete with these weeds, young seedlings may become smothered. These weeds also intensify the risk of fire, as they add to the fuel load which increases the heat of fires.

Too frequent fires are a threat to the species. If a fire recurred before adult plants coud regrow from lignotubers and replenish the seed bank, the only known population could be severely impacted.

This species is not known to occur within any protected areas, and thus requires conservation actions to support species recovery. These include weed and rabbit control, restricting access to known population sites, implementing appropriate fire management strategies and establishing translocated populations.

== Use in horticulture ==
Grevillea humifusa is cultivated as an ornamental plant and features dense, silvery-grey foliage contrasting with the flowers. It can be grown in most well-drained soil and is drought and frost-tolerant.

== See also ==
- List of Grevillea species
