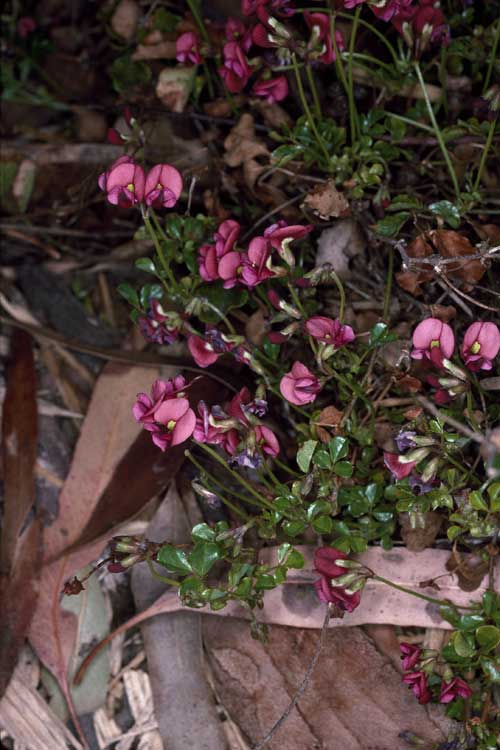
- Kennedia glabrata in the Australian National Botanic Gardens

Conservation status
- Vulnerable (EPBC Act)

Scientific classification
- Kingdom: Plantae
- Clade: Tracheophytes
- Clade: Angiosperms
- Clade: Eudicots
- Clade: Rosids
- Order: Fabales
- Family: Fabaceae
- Subfamily: Faboideae
- Genus: Kennedia
- Species: K. glabrata

Binomial name
- Kennedia glabrata Lindl.

Synonyms
- Caulinia glabrata (Lindl.) F.Muell.; Caulinia glabrata (Lindl.) Kuntze isonym; Zichya glabrata (Lindl.) Benth.; Zichya glabrata (Lindl.) Benth. isonym

= Kennedia glabrata =

Northcliffe kennedia

Species of legume

Kennedia glabrata, commonly known as Northcliffe kennedia, is a species of flowering plant in the family Fabaceae and is endemic to the south-west of Western Australia. It is a prostrate shrub or creeper with trifoliate leaves and orange-pink to red flowers with a yellow centre.

== Description ==
Kennedia glabrata is a prostrate shrub or creeper with hairy stems. The leaves are trifoliate, 20–105 mm (0.79–4.13 in) long with stipules 2–5 mm (0.079–0.197 in) long at the base, the leaflets with wavy edges. The flowers are arranged in groups on an erect flower stalk up to 150 mm (5.9 in) long, each flower on a glabrous pedicel about 5 mm (0.20 in) long. The five sepals are glabrous and 5.0–6.2 mm (0.20–0.24 in) long. The standard petal is orange-pink to red with a yellow centre and 12–13 mm (0.47–0.51 in) long, the wings red and about 9 mm (0.35 in) long and the keel red and about 10 mm (0.39 in) long. Flowering occurs from August to November and the fruit is a flattened pod 15–30 mm (0.59–1.18 in) long.

== Taxonomy ==
Kennedia glabrata was first formally described in 1836 by John Lindley in Edwards's Botanical Register. The specific epithet (glabrata) means "nearly glabrous".

== Distribution and habitat ==
Northcliffe kennedia grows in shallow pockets of soil on granite outcrops from Northcliffe to near Esperance.

== Conservation status ==
Kennedia glabrata is listed as "vulnerable" under the Australian Government Environment Protection and Biodiversity Conservation Act 1999 and as "Threatened Flora (Declared Rare Flora — Extant)" under the Western Australian Biodiversity Conservation Act 2016. The main threats to the species include weed invasion, grazing pressure, disturbance by feral pigs and dieback caused by Phytophthora cinnamomi.
