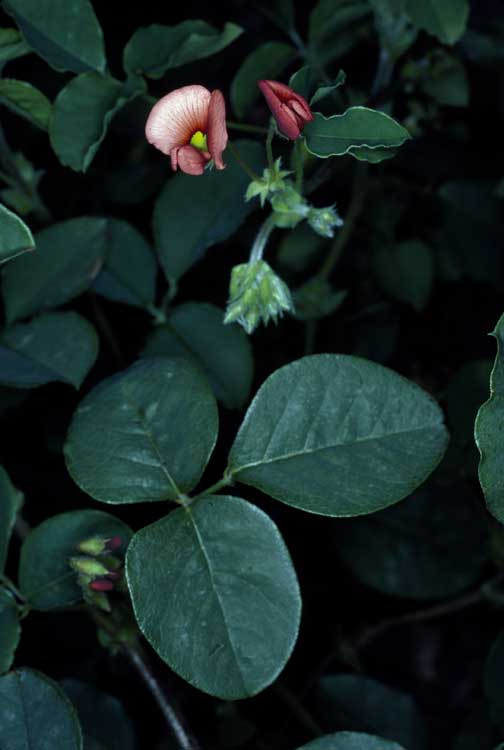
- Kennedia stirlingii

Scientific classification
- Kingdom: Plantae
- Clade: Tracheophytes
- Clade: Angiosperms
- Clade: Eudicots
- Clade: Rosids
- Order: Fabales
- Family: Fabaceae
- Subfamily: Faboideae
- Genus: Kennedia
- Species: K. stirlingii

Binomial name
- Kennedia stirlingii R.Br.

Synonyms
- List: Caulinia stirlingi F.Muell. orth. var.; Caulinia stirlingii (Lindl.) F.Muell.; Kennedya stirlingi Lindl. orth. var.; Kennedya stirlingii F.Muell orth. var.; Physolobium stirlingii (Lindl.) Benth. isonym; Physolobium stirlingii (Lindl.) Benth.

= Kennedia stirlingii =

Bushy kennedia

Species of legume

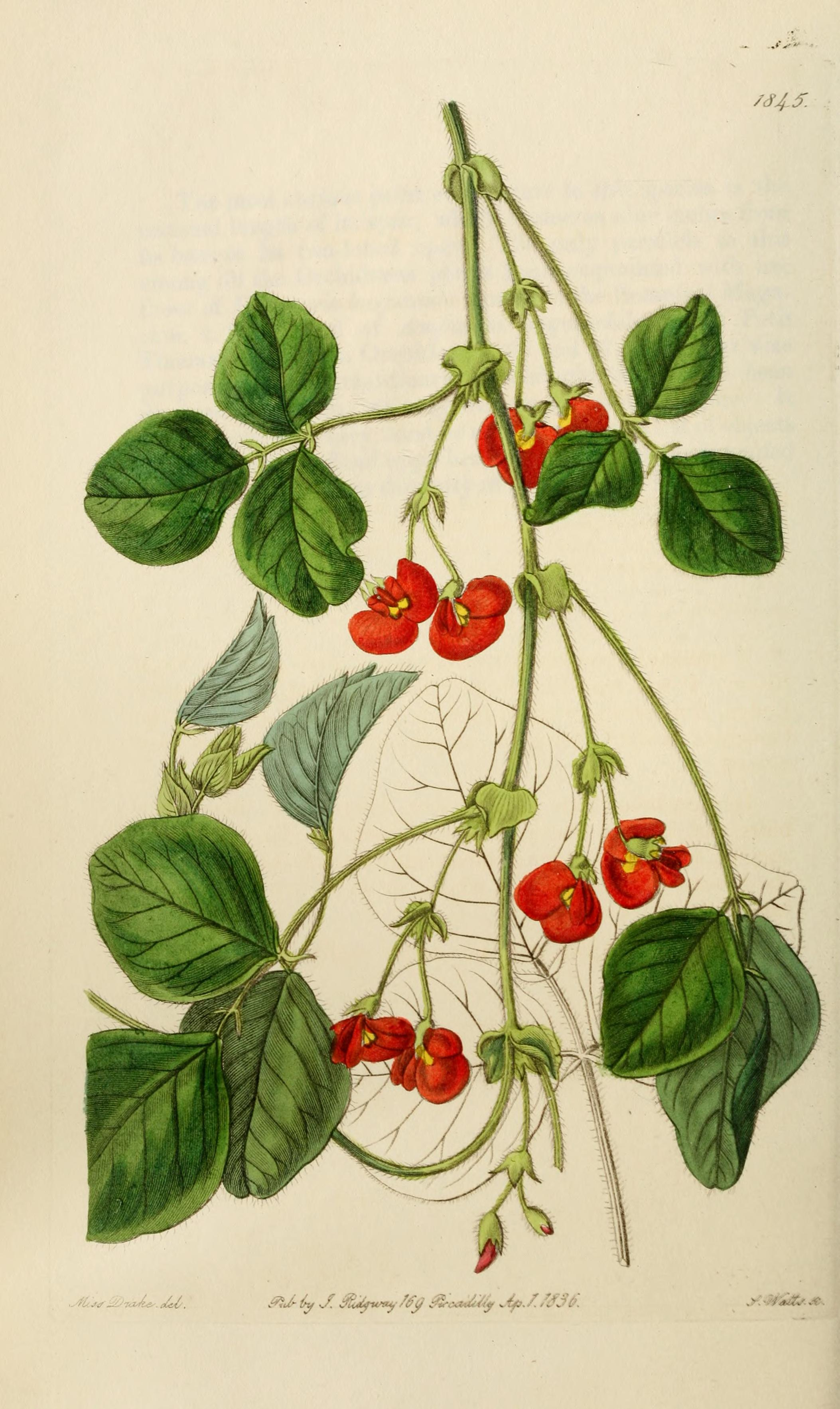
Illustration from Edwards's Botanical Register

Kennedia stirlingii, commonly known as bushy kennedia, is a species of flowering plant in the family Fabaceae and is endemic to the south-west of Western Australia. It is a trailing or twining shrub with trifoliate leaves and orange-red flowers.

== Description ==
Kennedia stirlingii is a trailing or twining shrub that typically grows to a height of 0.1–1 m (3.9 in – 3 ft 3.4 in) wide and has glabrous stems. The leaves are trifoliate, 65–75 mm (2.6–3.0 in) long with stipules 14–15 mm (0.55–0.59 in) long at the base, the leaflets flat. The flowers are uniformly orange-red and borne on hairy pedicels 15–25 mm (0.59–0.98 in) long. The five sepals are hairy and 6–9 mm (0.24–0.35 in) long, the standard petal 12–14.5 mm (0.47–0.57 in) long, the wings 9–11.5 mm (0.35–0.45 in) long and the keel 10.8–11.0 mm (0.43–0.43 in) long. Flowering occurs from August to November and the fruit is a hairy, flattened pod 20–30 mm (0.79–1.18 in) long.

== Taxonomy ==
Kennedia stirlingii was first formally described in 1844 by John Lindley in Edwards's Botanical Register. The specific epithet (stirlingii) honours James Stirling.

== Distribution and habitat ==
Bushy kennedia grows on granite outcrop, hillsides and moist areas in the Avon Wheatbelt, Jarrah Forest and Swan Coastal Plain biogeographic regions in south-western Western Australia.

== Conservation status ==
Kennedia stirlingii is listed as "not threatened" under the Western Australian Biodiversity Conservation Act 2016.
