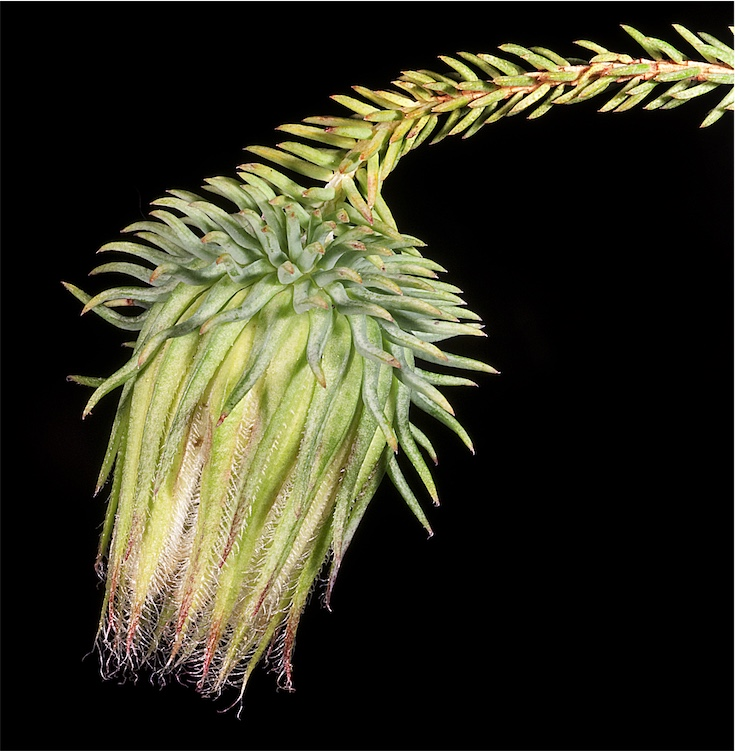
- Darwinia foetida near Bullsbrook

Conservation status
- Critically endangered (EPBC Act)

Scientific classification
- Kingdom: Plantae
- Clade: Tracheophytes
- Clade: Angiosperms
- Clade: Eudicots
- Clade: Rosids
- Order: Myrtales
- Family: Myrtaceae
- Genus: Darwinia
- Species: D. foetida

Binomial name
- Darwinia foetida Keighery
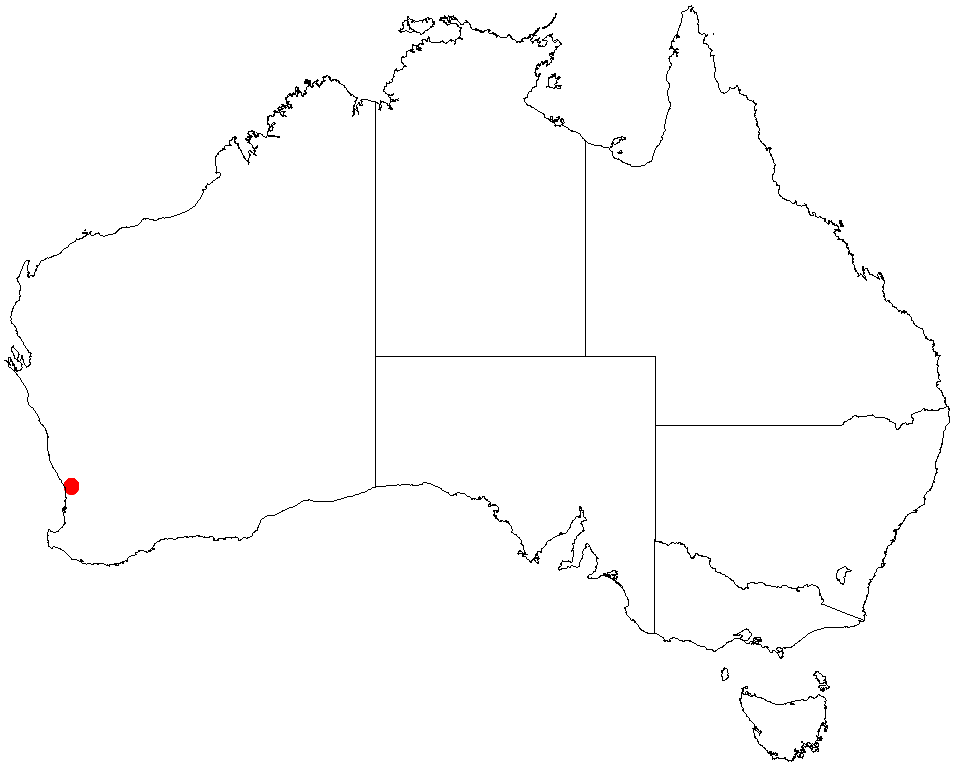
- Occurrence data from AVH

= Darwinia foetida =

Muchea bell

Species of flowering plant

Darwinia foetida, commonly known as Muchea bell, is a plant in the myrtle family Myrtaceae, and is endemic to Western Australia. It is a small upright shrub with greenish coloured nodding flowers at the apex of the stems, that have an unpleasant odour (hence the Latin specific epithet foetida, "smelly"). This is a very restricted species, known from only a couple of locations.

== Description ==
Darwinia foetida is a spreading upright shrub to 0.7 metres (2 ft) tall, often straggling over other plants for support. The young branches are green-brown and slender, with prominent decurrent leaf bases that become grey and woody. The green leaves are smooth, narrow and triangular in cross-section. The leaves are sharply bent forward and 3–5 mm (0.12–0.20 in) long, ending in a sharp point. The inflorescence consists of 12-15 flowers usually nodding at the end of the stem. The flower bracts are in rows, leaf-like and wider at the base. Individual flowers have two floral brown dry elongated bracts 2–3 mm (0.079–0.12 in) long tapering to a point. The longest bracts are red with green edges, hairs are 18–27 mm (0.71–1.1 in) long. Flowers are brown and tubular with ribs 3 mm (0.12 in) long. The sepals are a small triangle shape about 1 mm (0.039 in) long. Petals are egg-shaped to angled, about 1 mm (0.039 in) long and sharply pointed. The curved red style is wider at the base and 12–16 mm (0.47–0.63 in) long and tapering with hairs. It blooms between in late spring from October to November producing green flowers that have a foetid aroma.

== Taxonomy and naming ==
Darwinia foetida was first formally described in 2010 by Gregory John Keighery and published in the Australian Plant Census. The specific epithet (foetida) refers to the distinctive foetid smell of the flowers.

== Distribution and habitat ==
Muchea bell is found in a small area on the Swan Coastal Plain, with three locations recorded around Muchea about 70 kilometres (43 mi) north of Perth, Western Australia occupying a total area of about 1.2 square kilometres (0.5 sq mi). It grows on sandy grey-black mounds where there are seasonally moist winters to wet clay situations in either tall or low scrubland and areas where water collects.

== Conservation status ==
Darwinia foetida is classified as "critically endangered" under the Australian Government Environment Protection and Biodiversity Conservation Act 1999 and as "endangered" under the Biodiversity Conservation Act 2016 in Western Australia. The species has a restricted area of distribution in the Muchea area. The present main threat is grazing by rabbits, also weed invasion, inappropriate fire regimes and disease caused by Phytophthora cinnamomi.
