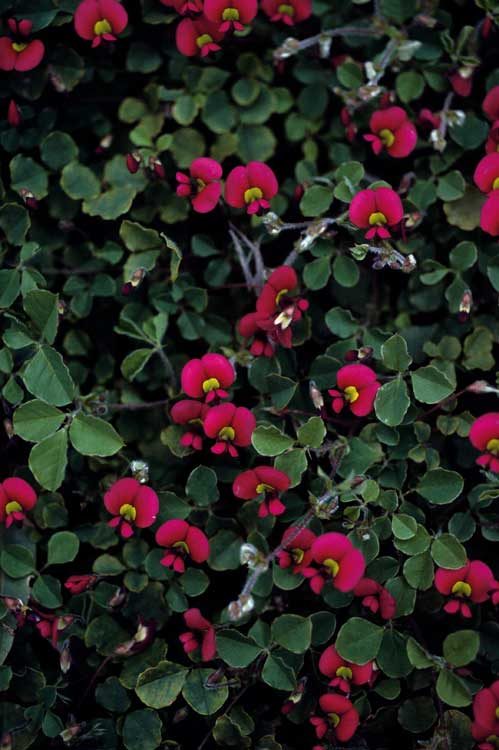
- In Maranoa Gardens

Scientific classification
- Kingdom: Plantae
- Clade: Tracheophytes
- Clade: Angiosperms
- Clade: Eudicots
- Clade: Rosids
- Order: Fabales
- Family: Fabaceae
- Subfamily: Faboideae
- Genus: Kennedia
- Species: K. carinata

Binomial name
- Kennedia carinata (Benth.) Van Houtte

Synonyms
- List: Caulinia carinata (Benth.) Kuntze; Kennedia carinata (Benth.) Domin isonym; Kennedia carinata (Benth.) Van Houtte var. carinata; Physolobium carinatum Benth. isonym; Physolobium carinatum Benth.; Physolobium carinatum Benth. nom. inval., nom. nud.; Physolobium gracile Loudon nom. inval., pro syn.

= Kennedia carinata =

Species of legume

Kennedia carinata is a species of flowering plant in the family Fabaceae and is endemic to the south-west of Western Australia. It is a prostrate shrub with trifoliate leaves and reddish-purple, pea-like flowers.

== Description ==
Kennedia carinata is a prostrate shrub with trifoliate leaves 131.5 mm (5.18 in) long with stipules present at the base of the petiole. The flowers are arranged on a hairy pedicel 12–25 mm (0.47–0.98 in) long. The five sepals are hairy and 6–7 mm (0.24–0.28 in) long, the standard petal reddish-purple and 8–15 mm (0.31–0.59 in) long, the wings 8–12.5 mm (0.31–0.49 in) long, and the keel 7.6–12.5 mm (0.30–0.49 in) long. Flowering occurs from September to November and the fruit is a flattened, hairy pod 27–30 mm (1.1–1.2 in) long and 7–10 mm (0.28–0.39 in) wide.

== Taxonomy and naming ==
This species was first formally described in 1837 by George Bentham who gave it the name Physolobium carinatum in Enumeratio plantarum quas in Novae Hollandiae ora austro-occidentali ad fluvium Cygnorum et in sinu Regis Georgii collegit Carolus Liber Baro de Hügel from specimens collected by Charles von Hügel near King George's Sound. In 1855 Louis Benoit Van Houtte changed the nae to Kennedia carinata. The specific epithet (carinata) means "keeled", referring to the petal keel.

== Distribution and habitat ==
This kennedia grows on swampy river flats and the lower slopes of hills in the Esperance Plains, Jarrah Forest, Swan Coastal Plain and Warren biogeographic regions of south-western Western Australia.

== Conservation status ==
Kennedia carinata is classified as "not threatened" by the Government of Western Australia Department of Biodiversity, Conservation and Attractions.
