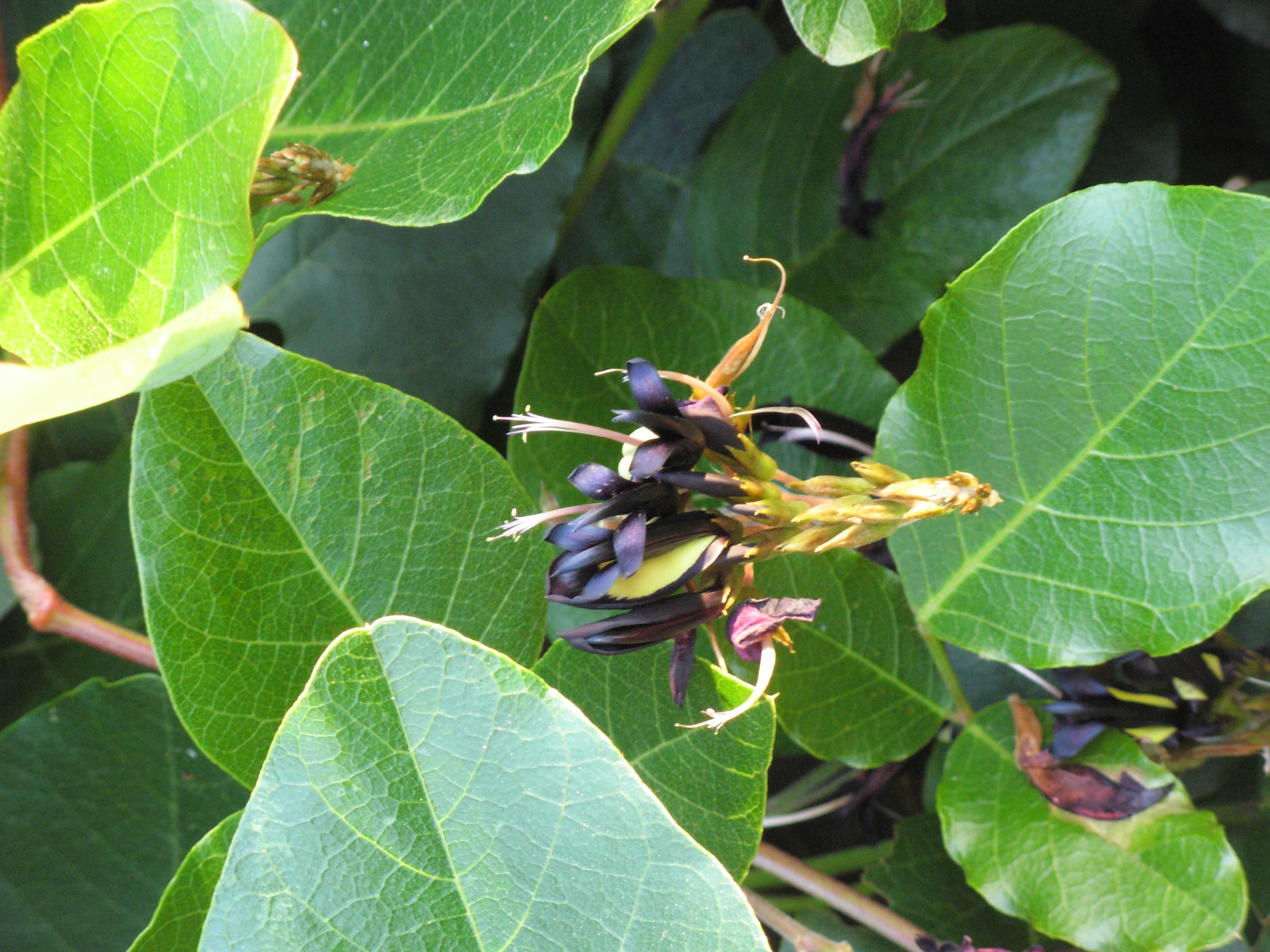

Scientific classification
- Kingdom: Plantae
- Clade: Tracheophytes
- Clade: Angiosperms
- Clade: Eudicots
- Clade: Rosids
- Order: Fabales
- Family: Fabaceae
- Subfamily: Faboideae
- Tribe: Phaseoleae
- Subtribe: Kennediinae
- Genus: Kennedia
- Species: K. nigricans

Binomial name
- Kennedia nigricans Lindl.

Synonyms
- Caulinia nigricans (Lindl.) F.Muell.; Caulinia nigricans (Lindl.) Kuntze isonym

= Kennedia nigricans =

Black kennedia

Species of legume

Kennedia nigricans, commonly known as black kennedia, is a species of flowering plant in the family Fabaceae and is endemic to the south-west of Western Australia. It is a trailing or twining shrub or climber with trifoliate leaves and black and yellow-orange flowers.

== Description ==
Kennedia nigricans is a trailing or twining shrub or a vigorous woody climber that typically climbs to a height of up to 4 m (13 ft) and spreads up to 6 m (20 ft). The leaves are dark green, trifoliate and 70–180 mm (2.8–7.1 in) long on a petiole 10–30 mm (0.39–1.18 in) long with stipules 4.5 mm (0.18 in) long at the base. The leaflets are egg-shaped, the end leaflet 30–90 mm (1.2–3.5 in) long and 20–70 mm (0.79–2.76 in) wide on a petiolule up to 17 mm (0.67 in) long. The lateral leaflets are smaller, on a short petiolule. The flowers are arranged in groups of up to fifteen on a peduncle 20–130 mm (0.79–5.12 in) long, each flower 30–33 mm (1.2–1.3 in) long on a pedicel 100–150 mm (3.9–5.9 in) long. The five sepals are 12–14 mm (0.47–0.55 in) long with triangular or lance-shaped teeth about 4 mm (0.16 in) long, the upper two joined for most of their length. The petals are violet or purple to almost black and yellow-orange, the standard petal is 22–27 mm (0.87–1.06 in) long, the wings 28–30 mm (1.1–1.2 in) long and the keel about 27 mm (1.1 in) long. Flowering occurs from July to November and the fruit is a pod 46–70 mm (1.8–2.8 in) long.

== Taxonomy ==
Kennedia nigricans was first formally described in 1835 by John Lindley in Edwards's Botanical Register, where it was also labelled as "Dingy-flowered Kennedya". The specific epithet (nigricans) means "blackish".

== Distribution and habitat ==
Black kennedia grows on coastal dunes, on creek margins and on flats in the Esperance Plains, Jarrah Forest and Swan Coastal Plain biogeographic regions of south-western Western Australia. It is also naturalised in other parts of that state and also in South Australia and Tasmania.

== Use in horticulture ==
A cultivar known as Kennedia nigricans 'Minstrel' was registered with the Australian Cultivar Registration Authority by Goldup Nursery of Mount Evelyn, Victoria in September 1985. This cultivar was selected from a batch of seedlings in 1983 and has a pale colouration instead of the yellow, which appears almost white.

This climber is noted for its vigour and can be used to cover embankments or unsightly structures. The species is adapted to a range of soils and prefers a sunny position. It is resistant to drought and has some frost tolerance. The species can be propagated by scarified seed or cuttings of semi-mature growth, while the cultivar requires propagation from cuttings to remain true to type.
