= Pultenaea benthamii =

Bentham's bush-pea

Scientific classification
- Kingdom: Plantae
- Clade: Tracheophytes
- Clade: Angiosperms
- Clade: Eudicots
- Clade: Rosids
- Order: Fabales
- Family: Fabaceae
- Subfamily: Faboideae
- Genus: Pultenaea
- Species: P. benthamii

Binomial name
- Pultenaea benthamii F.Muell.

Synonyms
- Pultenaea benthami F.Muell. nom. inval., nom. nud.; Pultenaea benthamii F.Muell. isonym; Pultenaea benthamii F.Muell. var. benthamii

Species of flowering plant

Pultenaea benthamii, commonly known as Bentham's bush-pea, is a species of flowering plant in the family Fabaceae and is endemic to south-eastern continental Australia. It is an erect shrub with sharply-pointed, narrow elliptic to linear leaves and yellow to orange and red flowers in clusters at the ends of branches.

== Description ==
Pultenaea benthamii is an erect shrub that typically grows to a height of up to 3.5 mm (0.14 in) with stems that are hairy when young. The leaves are narrow elliptic to linear, 5–25 mm (0.20–0.98 in) long and 1–3 mm (0.039–0.118 in) wide with stipules 1–2 mm (0.039–0.079 in) long at the base and a sharply pointed tip. The flowers are about 10 mm (0.39 in) long and borne in clusters in leaf axils at the ends of side shoots on pedicels 1–2 mm (0.039–0.079 in) long. There are dark brown bracteoles 2–5 mm (0.079–0.197 in) long at the base of the sepals and bracts 4–5 mm (0.16–0.20 in) long that fall off as the flower opens. The sepals are 3–6 mm (0.12–0.24 in) long and covered with pale hairs. The standard petal is yellow and orange, 11–12 mm (0.43–0.47 in) long, the wings yellow to orange and the keel is red to purple. Flowering occurs from September to November and the fruit is a flattened oval pod 6–8 mm (0.24–0.31 in) long.

== Taxonomy and naming ==
Pultenaea benthamii was first formally described in 1864 by Ferdinand von Mueller in Definitions of rare or hitherto undescribed Australian plants. The specific epithet (benthamii) honours George Bentham.

== Distribution and habitat ==
This pultenaea grows in forest, woodland and heath with scattered populations in the Grampians National Park, in eastern Victoria and in the far south-east of New South Wales.
