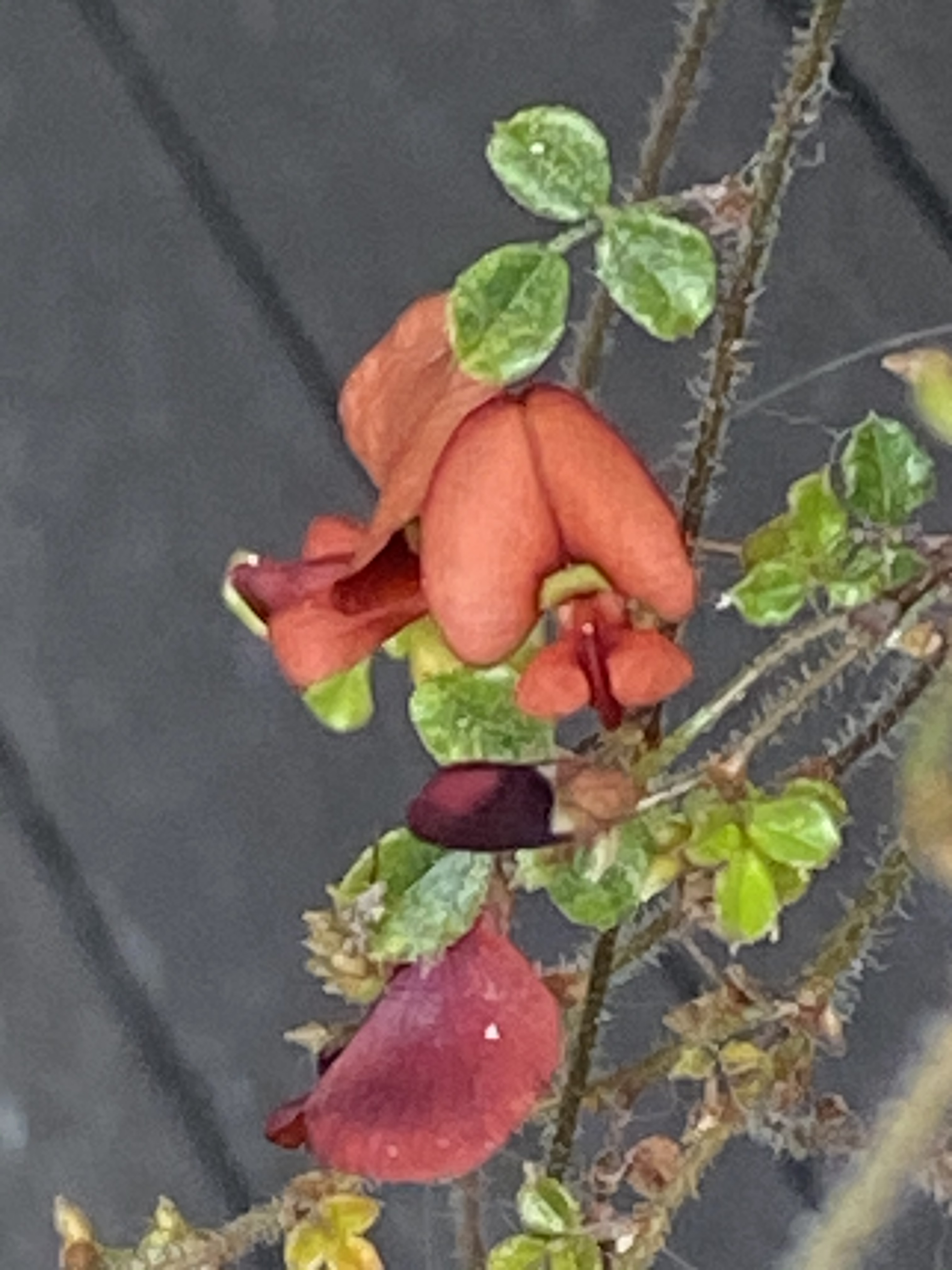

Scientific classification
- Kingdom: Plantae
- Clade: Tracheophytes
- Clade: Angiosperms
- Clade: Eudicots
- Clade: Rosids
- Order: Fabales
- Family: Fabaceae
- Subfamily: Faboideae
- Genus: Kennedia
- Species: K. microphylla

Binomial name
- Kennedia microphylla Meisn.

Synonyms
- Caulinia microphylla (Meisn.) F.Muell.

= Kennedia microphylla =

Species of legume

Kennedia microphylla is a species of flowering plant in the family Fabaceae and is endemic to the south-west of Western Australia. It is a prostrate, mat-forming creeper with relatively small, trifoliate leaves and red flowers.

== Description ==
Kennedia microphylla is a prostrate, mat-forming creeper that typically grows to 5–30 cm (2.0–11.8 in) wide and 1.5 m (4 ft 11 in) wide. The leaves are trifoliate, 13–20 mm (0.51–0.79 in) long with stipules 5.5 mm (0.22 in) long at the base, the leaflets flat. The flowers are uniformly red and borne on hairy pedicels about 3.5 mm (0.14 in) long. The five sepals are hairy and 4.0–4.5 mm (0.16–0.18 in) long. The standard petal is 9.5–10 mm (0.37–0.39 in) long, the wings 7.0–8.5 mm (0.28–0.33 in) long and the keel 7.5–8.0 mm (0.30–0.31 in) long. Flowering occurs from August to December and the fruit is a hairy, flattened pod 21–25 mm (0.83–0.98 in) long.

== Taxonomy ==
Kennedia microphylla was first formally described in 1844 by Carl Meissner in Lehmann's Plantae Preissianae. The specific epithet (microphylla) means "small-leaved".

== Distribution and habitat ==
This kennedia grows in sandy soil in swampy places and in coastal areas in the Avon Wheatbelt, Esperance Plains, Jarrah Forest and Swan Coastal Plain biogeographic regions in south-western Western Australia.

== Conservation status ==
Kennedia microphylla is listed as "not threatened" under the Western Australian Biodiversity Conservation Act 2016.
