= Leioproctus sequax =

Scientific classification
- Kingdom: Animalia
- Phylum: Arthropoda
- Clade: Pancrustacea
- Class: Insecta
- Order: Hymenoptera
- Family: Colletidae
- Genus: Leioproctus
- Species: L. sequax

Binomial name
- Leioproctus sequax Maynard 2013

Species of bee

Leioproctus sequax, or Leioproctus (Alokocolletes) sequax, is a species of bee in the family Colletidae and subfamily Colletinae. It is endemic to Australia. It was described by Australian entomologist Glynn Maynard in 2013.

== Etymology ==
The specific epithet sequax (Latin: "follower") refers to the species following Leioproctus excubitor.

== Description ==
Female body length is 9 mm. Integumental colouration is mainly black. The hair is mostly white.

== Distribution and habitat ==
The species occurs in arid central Australia. The type locality is 12.8 km north-east of Windorah, in south-western Queensland.

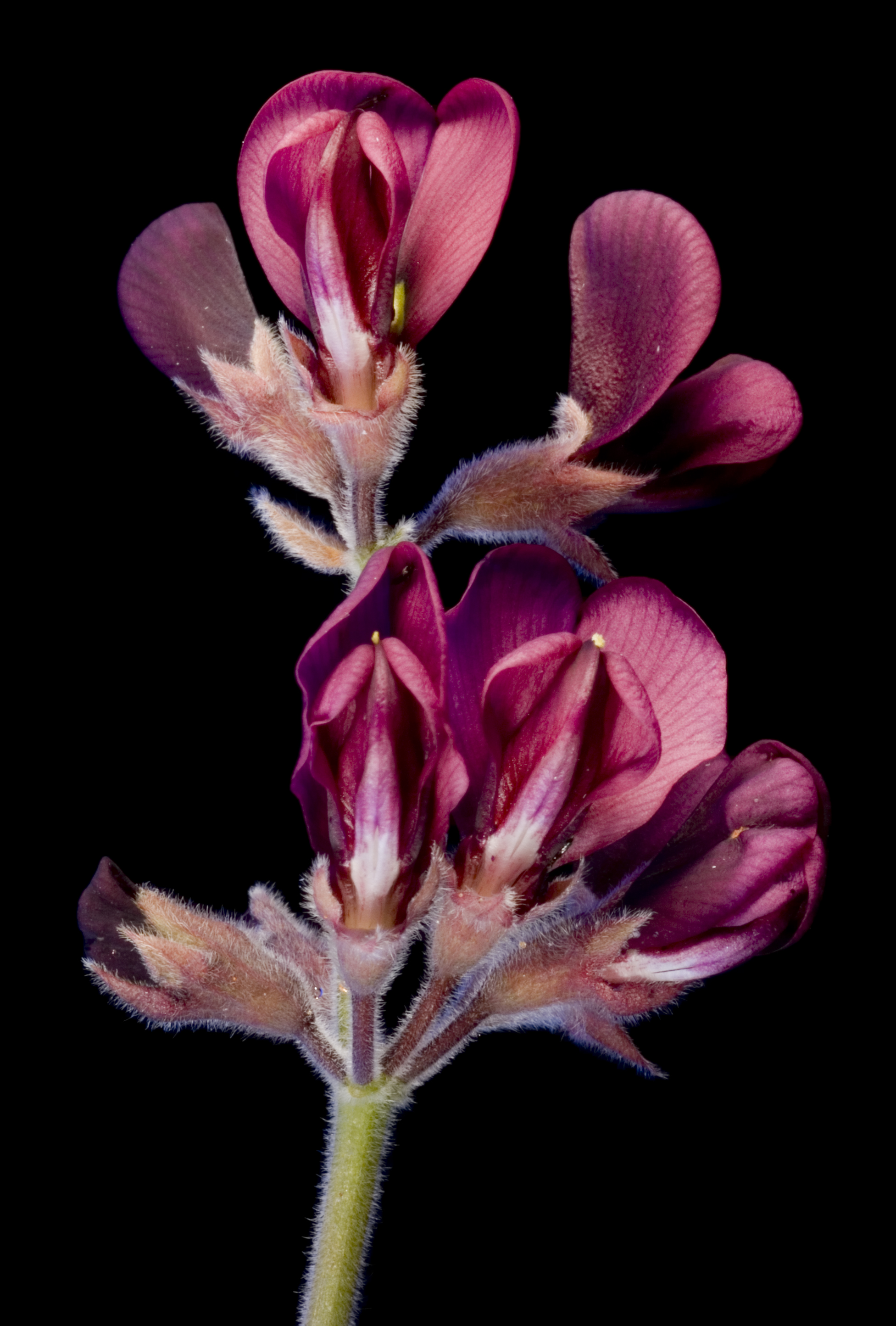
Flowers of Kennedia prorepens, a forage plant of the bees

== Behaviour ==
The adults are flying mellivores. Flowering plants visited by the bees include Kennedia prorepens, Cullen patens, Parakeelya balonensis and Trachymene glaucifolia, as well as Ptilotus species.

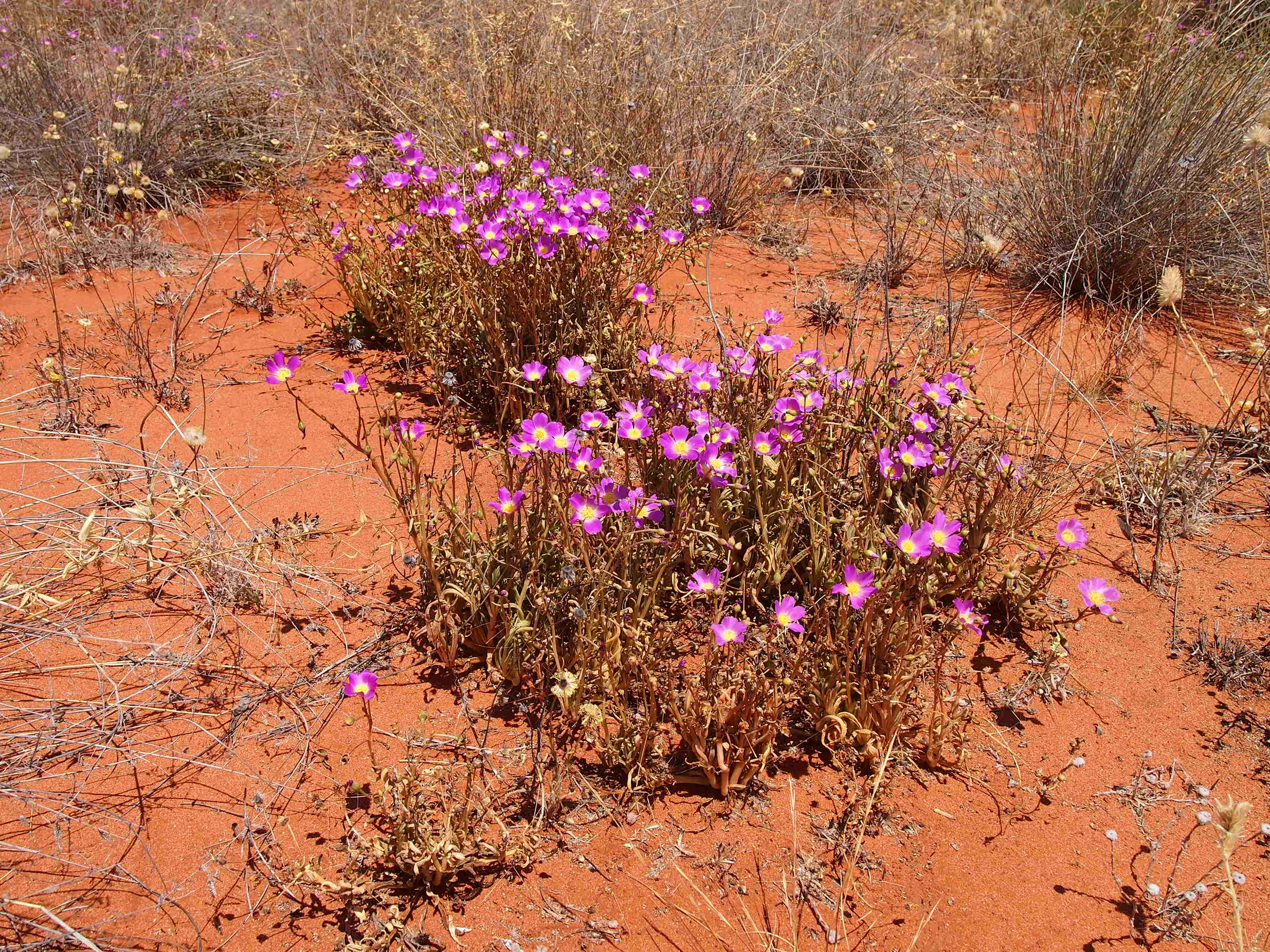
Parakeelya balonnensis (broad-leaf parakeelya), a forage plant of the bees
