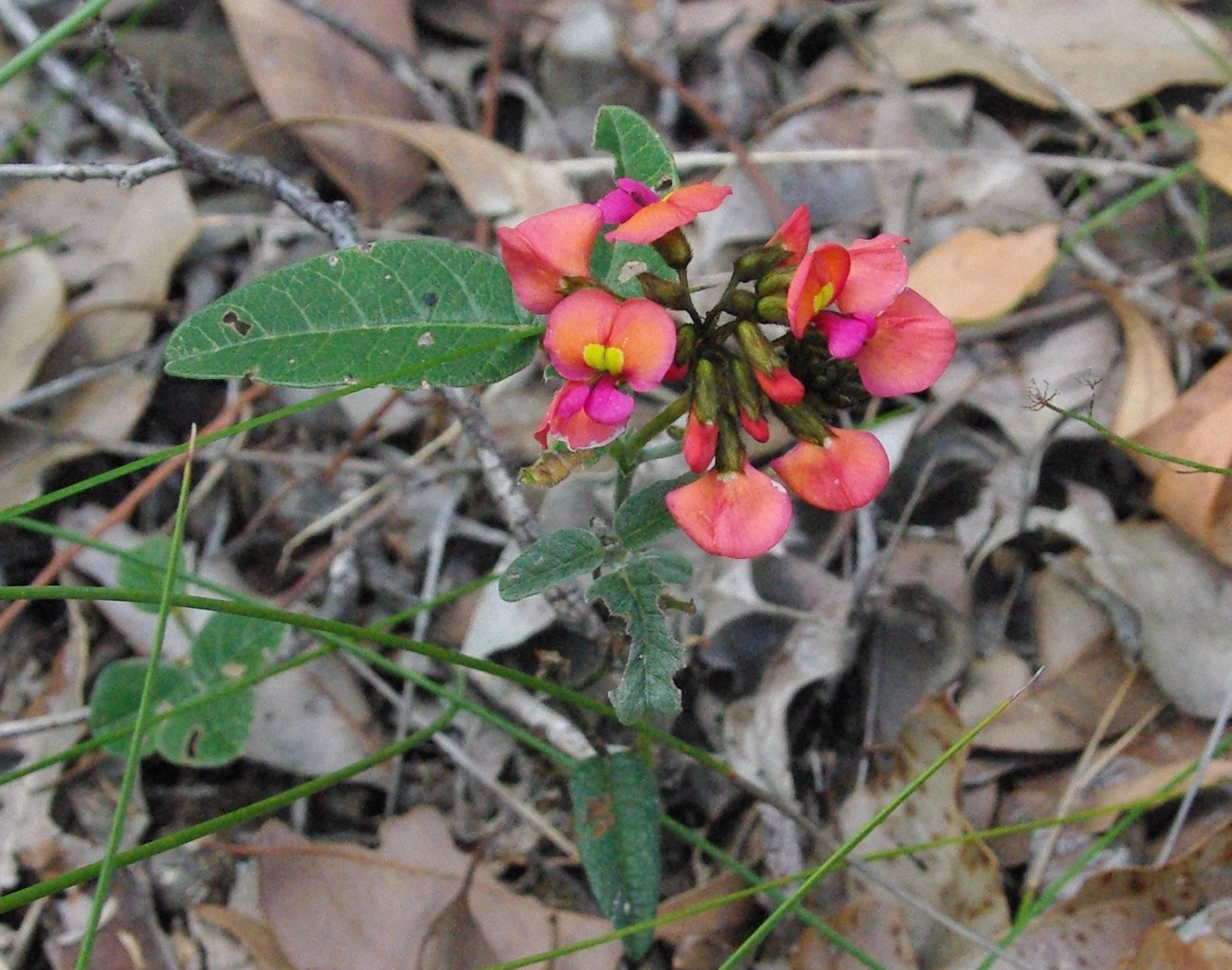
- Kennedia coccinea in Glen Forrest, Western Australia

Scientific classification
- Kingdom: Plantae
- Clade: Tracheophytes
- Clade: Angiosperms
- Clade: Eudicots
- Clade: Rosids
- Order: Fabales
- Family: Fabaceae
- Subfamily: Faboideae
- Genus: Kennedia
- Species: K. coccinea

Binomial name
- Kennedia coccinea (Curtis) Vent.

Synonyms
- List: Caulinia coccinea (Curtis) F.Muell.; Caulinia coccinea (Curtis) Kuntze isonym; Caulinia eximia (Lindl. ex Paxton) F.Muell.; Caulinia eximia (Lindl. ex Paxton) Kuntze isonym; Caulinia inophylla (Lindl.) Kuntze; Glycine coccinea Curtis nom. et typ. cons.; Kennedia coccinea var. angustifolia (Lindl.) Diels; Kennedia coccinea var. elegans Paxton; Kennedia coccinea var. inophylla (Lindl.) Domin; Kennedia coccinea var. villosa (Lindl.) Domin; Kennedia dilatata Sweet nom. inval., nom. nud.; Kennedia dilatata A.Cunn. ex Lindl.; Kennedia eximia Lindl. ex Paxton; Kennedia heterophylla Sweet nom. inval., nom. nud.; Kennedia inophylla Sweet nom. inval., nom. nud.; Kennedia inophylla Lindl.; Kennedia pannosa (Paxton) Daveau; Kennedya coccinea Domin orth. var.; Kennedya coccinea var. inophylla Domin orth. var.; Kennedya coccinea var. villosa Domin orth. var.; Kennedya inophylla Lindl.; Zichya angustifolia Lindl.; Zichya coccinea (Curtis) Benth. isonym; Zichya coccinea (Curtis) Hügel; Zichya coccinea (Curtis) Benth. isonym; Zichya dilatata (A.Cunn. ex Lindl.) E.Pritz.; Zichya inophylla (Lindl.) Benth. isonym; Zichya inophylla (Lindl.) Hügel; Zichya inophylla (Lindl.) Benth. isonym; Zichya pannosa Paxton; Zichya sericea Hügel; Zichya tricolor Lindl.; Zichya villosa Lindl.

= Kennedia coccinea =

Coral vine

Species of legume

Kennedia coccinea, commonly known as coral vine, is a species of flowering plant in the family Fabaceae and is endemic to the south-west of Western Australia. It is a twining, climbing or prostrate shrub with trifoliate leaves and orange-pink, red and pink, pea-like flowers.

== Description ==
Kennedia coccinea is a twining, climbing or prostrate shrub, with stems up to 4 mm (0.16 in) in diameter covered with white to ginger-coloured hairs. The leaves are trifoliate, the end leaflet 11–83 mm (0.43–3.27 in) long and 7–55 mm (0.28–2.17 in) wide, the lateral leaflets smaller. The leaves are a darker green on the upper surface than the lower and are on a petiole 6–60 mm (0.24–2.36 in) long, each leaflet on a petiolule 0.5–3 mm (0.020–0.118 in) long. The stipules at the base of the petiole are triangular, 1.7–5 mm (0.067–0.197 in) long. The flowers are 9.5–16 mm (0.37–0.63 in) long and arranged in groups of between three and thirty on a peduncle 60–230 mm (2.4–9.1 in) long, each flower on a pedicel 1.5–10 mm (0.059–0.394 in) long. The five sepals are hairy, 5–8 mm (0.20–0.31 in) long with lobes 2–4 mm (0.079–0.157 in) long. The standard petal is orange-red to pink with a greenish-yellow centre, 9.8–16 mm (0.39–0.63 in) long, the wings pink and 8.9–14 mm (0.35–0.55 in) long and the keel red and 8–11 mm (0.31–0.43 in) long. Flowering occurs from July to December and the fruit is a flattened, narrow oblong pod 25–72 mm (0.98–2.83 in) long.

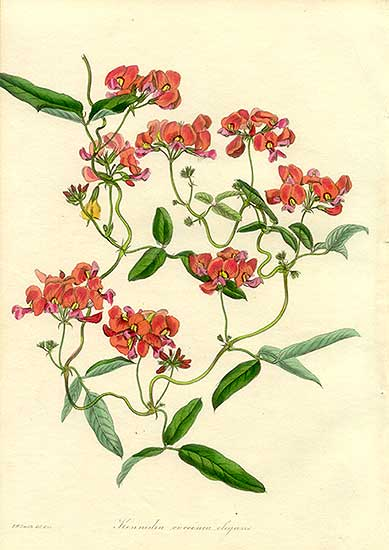
Kennedia coccinea var. elegans illustrated in Paxton's Magazine of Botany in 1835

== Taxonomy ==
This species was first formally described in 1794 by William Curtis who gave it the name Glycine coccinea in his Botanical Magazine from plants raised "in the neighbourhood of London from Botany-Bay seeds". In 1805, Étienne Pierre Ventenat changed the name to Kennedia coccinea in his book Jardin de la Malmaison. The specific epithet (coccinea) means "scarlet".

Two varieties, elegans and coccinea were described in Paxton's Magazine of Botany in 1835, and a further three varieties molly, sericea and villosawere transferred from the genus Zichya in 1923 by Czech botanist Karel Domin. All five of these varieties are now regarded as synonyms of K. coccinea by the Australian Plant Census.

In 2010, Terena R. Lally described three subspecies of K. coccinea and the names are accepted by the Australian Plant Census:

- Kennedia coccinea subsp. calcaria Lally is a prostrate or scrambling shrub with flowers in groups of thirteen to thirty or more, growing on sand in coastal heath;
- Kennedia coccinea (Curtis) Vent. subsp. coccinea is a twining or scrambling shrub with flowers in groups of thirteen to thirty or more, growing in forest;
- Kennedia coccinea subsp. esotera Lally is a prostrate shrub with flowers in groups of three to twelve.

== Distribution and habitat ==
Subspecies calcaria grows in sand over limestone in coastal heath between Jurien Bay and Albany, subsp. coccinea in forest and woodland in a wide area between Northam Augusta and Albany, and subsp. esotera in open forest, mallee-heath or scrub, often in disturbed areas, from near Eneabba to Albany and Israelite Bay.

== Conservation status ==
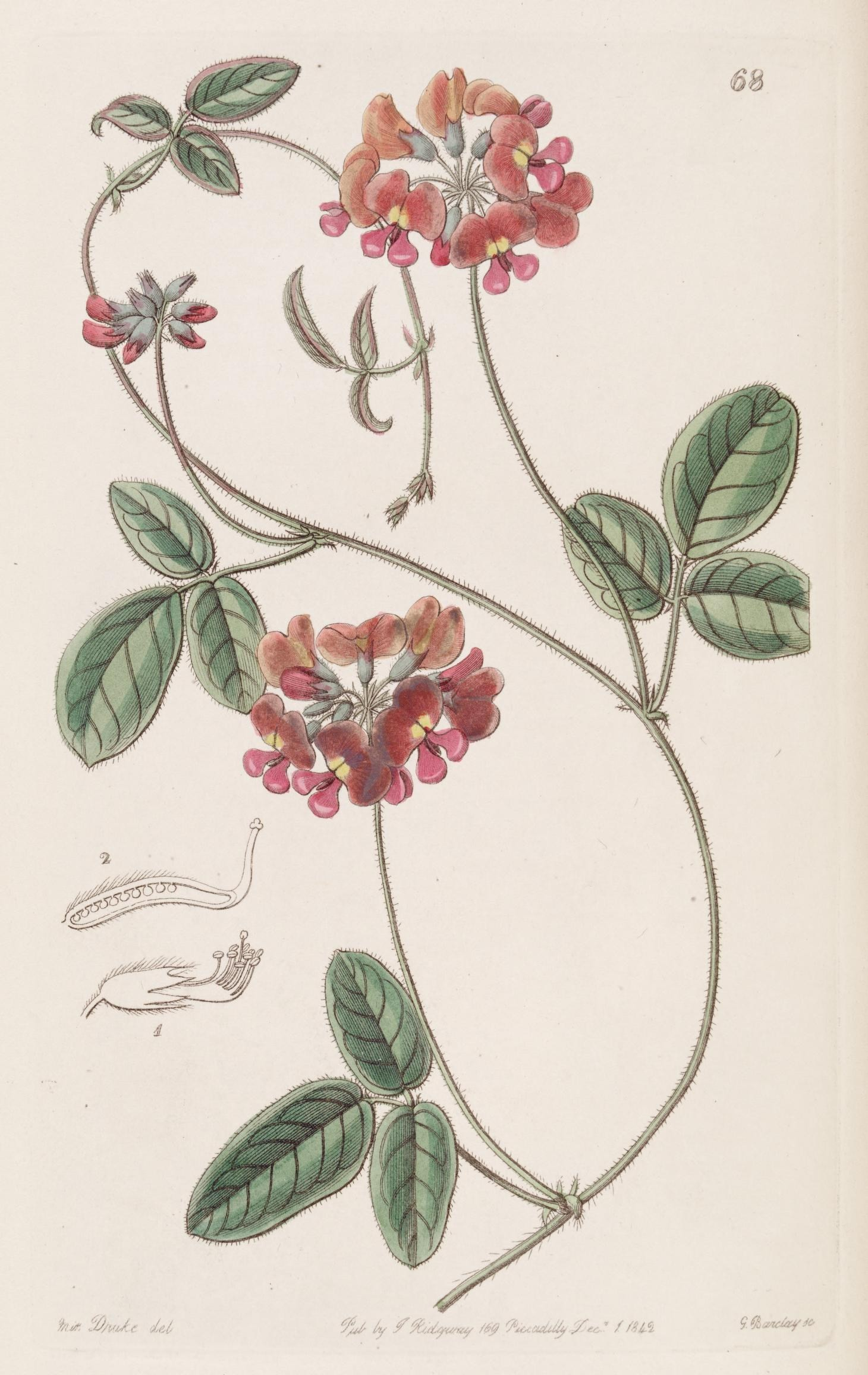
Illustration from 1842

All three subspecies of K. coccinea are listed as "not threatened" by the Government of Western Australia Department of Biodiversity, Conservation and Attractions.

== Use in horticulture ==
The species is naturally adapted to sandy or lighter soils and prefers some shade. It is resistant to drought and has some frost tolerance. Plants can be propagated by scarified seed or cuttings of semi-mature growth.
