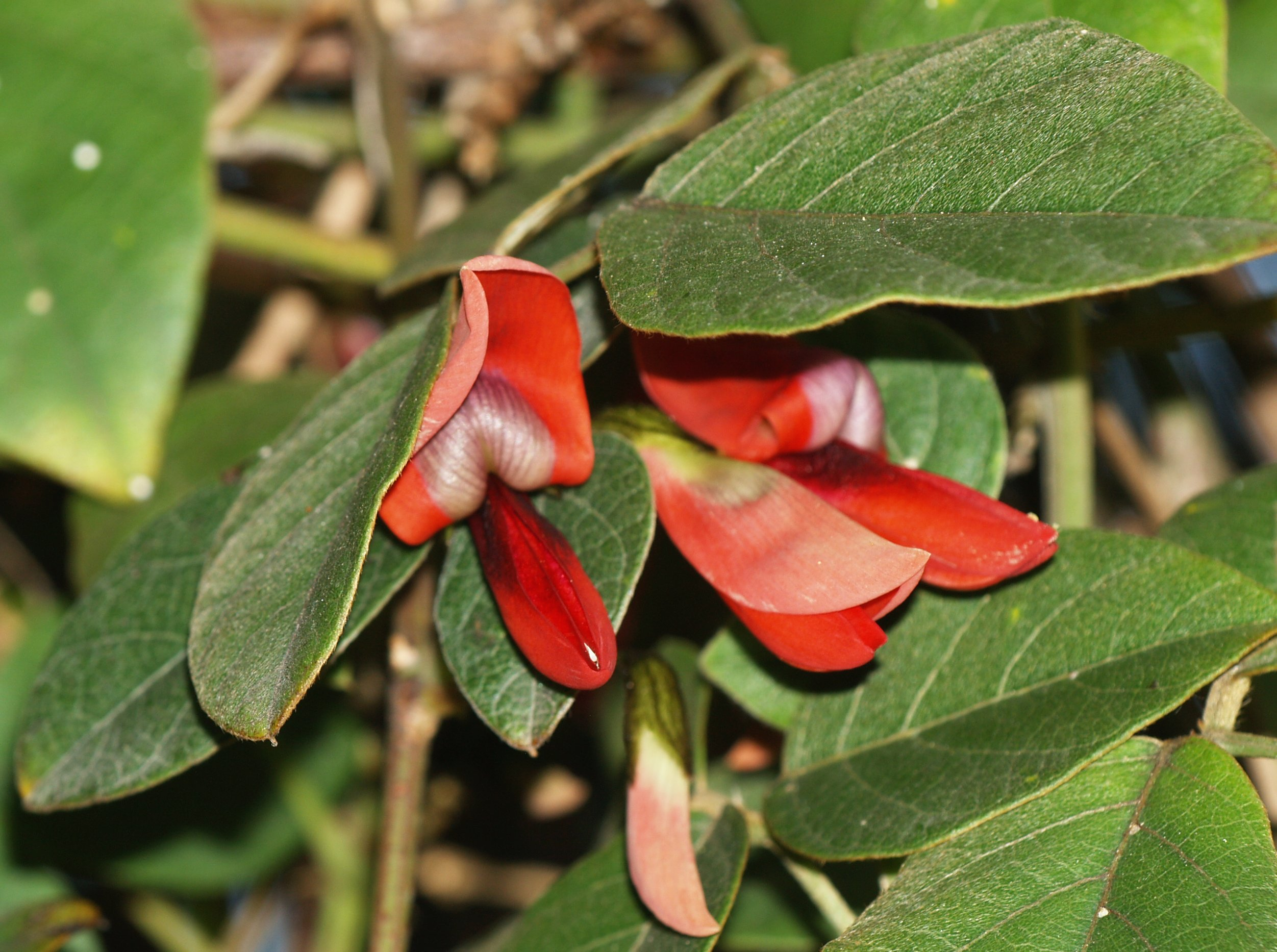
- Kennedia rubicunda

Scientific classification
- Kingdom: Plantae
- Clade: Tracheophytes
- Clade: Angiosperms
- Clade: Eudicots
- Clade: Rosids
- Order: Fabales
- Family: Fabaceae
- Subfamily: Faboideae
- Genus: Kennedia
- Species: K. rubicunda

Binomial name
- Kennedia rubicunda Vent.
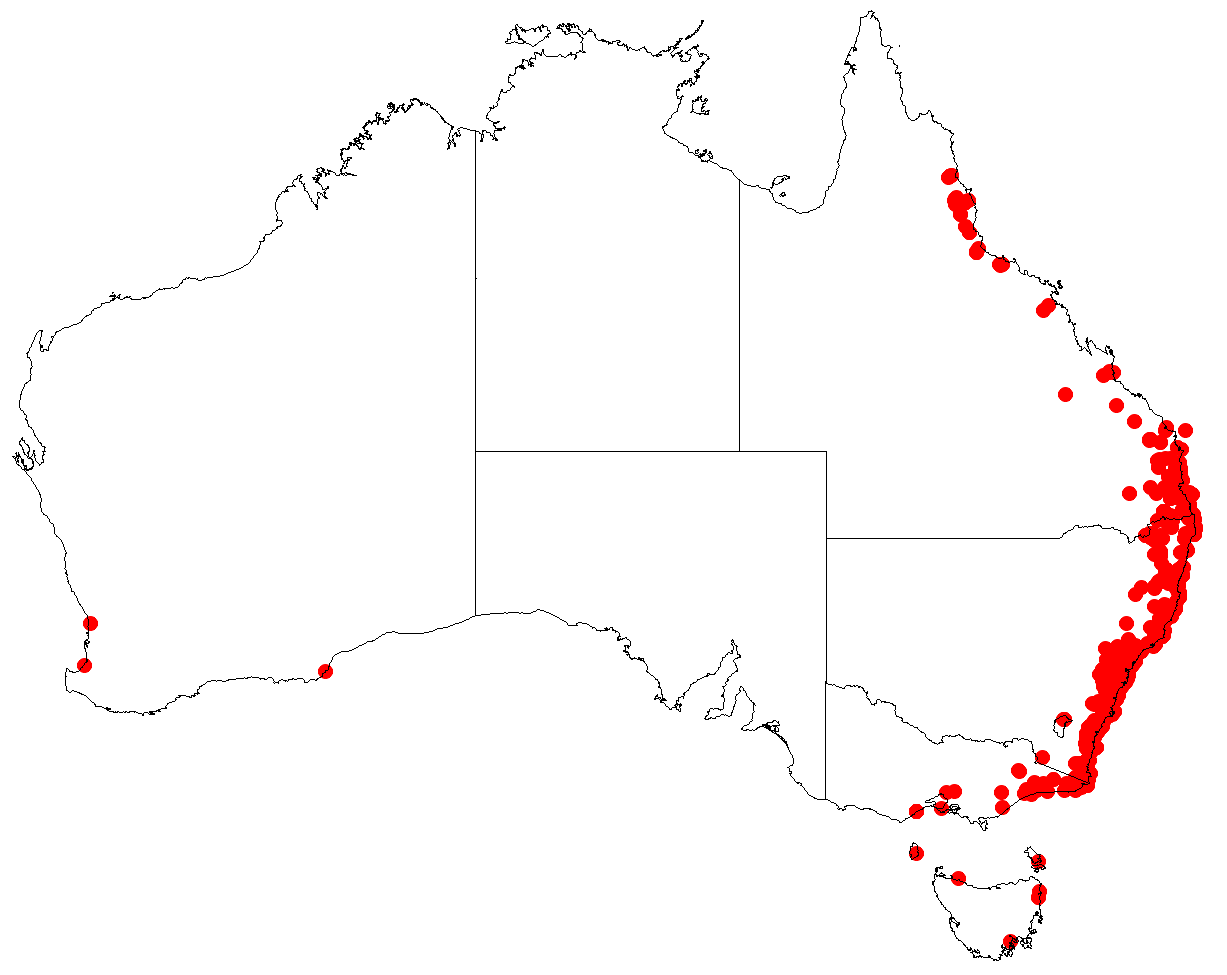
- Australian occurrence data from Australasian Virtual Herbarium

Synonyms
- Caulinia rubicunda (Schneev.) Moench; Glycine rubicunda Schneev.; Glycine rubicunda Curtis isonym; Kennedia rubicunda (Schneev.) Vent. var. rubicunda

= Kennedia rubicunda =

Dusky coral pea

Species of legume

Kennedia rubicunda, commonly known as the dusky coral pea, is a species of flowering plant in the family Fabaceae and is endemic to eastern continental Australia. It is a twining or prostrate herb with trifoliate leaves and dark red or purple flowers.

== Description ==
Kennedia rubicunda is a twining or prostrate herb with stems up to 4 metres (13 ft) long and covered with rusty-brown hairs. The leaves are trifoliate on a petiole 10–50 mm (0.39–1.97 in) long, the leaflets egg-shaped to lance-shaped, 30–120 mm (1.2–4.7 in) long and 20–80 mm (0.79–3.15 in) wide with lance-shaped stipules 2–4 mm (0.079–0.157 in) long at the base of the petiole. Dark red pea flowers are arranged in racemes of up to twelve on a peduncle 20–70 mm (0.79–2.76 in) long, each flower on a pedicel 10–20 mm (0.39–0.79 in) long. The sepals are 10–15 mm (0.39–0.59 in) long and densely covered with rusty-brown hairs and the petals are 30–40 mm (1.2–1.6 in) long. Flowering mostly occurs from September to December and the fruit is a rusty-hairy, flattened pod 50–100 mm (2.0–3.9 in) long containing ten to fifteen seeds.

== Taxonomy ==
Dusky coral pea was first formally described in 1793 by Dutch botanist George Voorhelm Schneevoogt, who gave it the name Glycine rubicunda in his book Icones Plantarum rariorum. In 1804 it was published under its current name by French botanist Étienne Pierre Ventenat in his book, Jardin de la Malmaison. The specific epithet (rubicunda) refers to the species' red flowers.

== Distribution and habitat ==
Kennedia rubicunda is widespread in a variety of habitats, including in forests and rainforest margins, on the coast and nearby tablelands of Queensland, New South Wales and far eastern Victoria. It is an introduced species in India, Tasmania and the North Island of New Zealand (where it is considered a weed).

== Ecology ==
Flowers of K. rubicunda are pollinated by birds. Seed dispersal by ants (myrmecochory) has been reported, in which ants are attracted to fatty acid-rich elaiosomes attached to the outside of the seeds. The plant is killed by bushfire but regenerates from seed dormant in the soil and is often abundant after fire. K. rubicunda forms a symbiosis with soil nitrogen fixing bacteria (rhizobia) resulting in the formation of nodules on the roots that fix atmospheric nitrogen which is used for plant growth.

== Use in horticulture ==
This plant is noted for its vigour and can be used to cover embankments or structures. The species is adapted to a range of well-drained soils and adapts to positions with sun or partial shade. It is resistant to drought and has some frost tolerance. The species can be propagated by scarified seed or cuttings of semi-mature growth.
