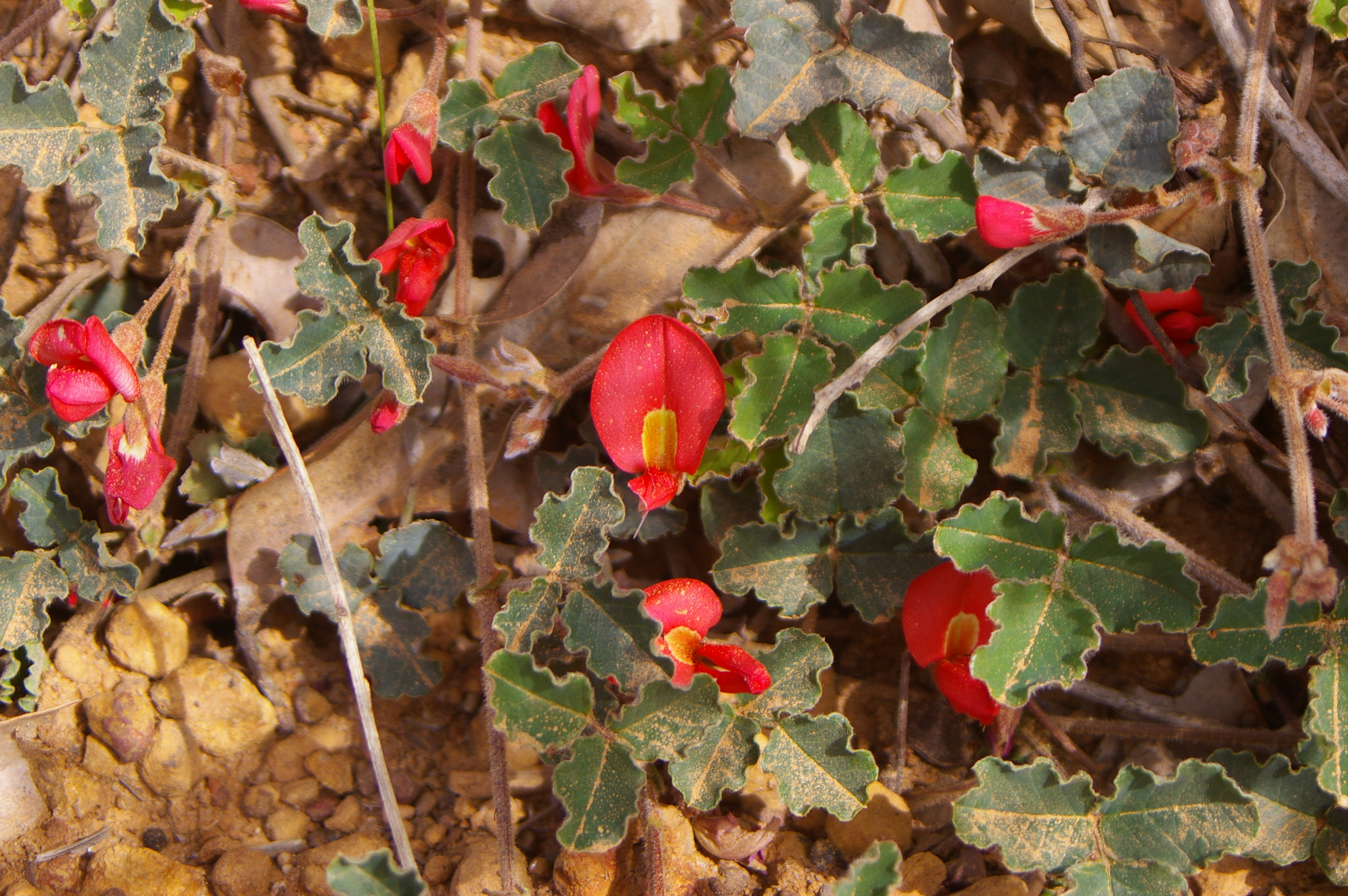
- Kennedia prostrata Drummond Nature Reserve

Scientific classification
- Kingdom: Plantae
- Clade: Tracheophytes
- Clade: Angiosperms
- Clade: Eudicots
- Clade: Rosids
- Order: Fabales
- Family: Fabaceae
- Subfamily: Faboideae
- Tribe: Phaseoleae
- Subtribe: Kennediinae
- Genus: Kennedia; Vent.

Species
- See text.

Synonyms
- Caulinia Moench nom. illeg.; Physolobium Benth. isonym; ?Zichya Hügel

= Kennedia =

Genus of legumes

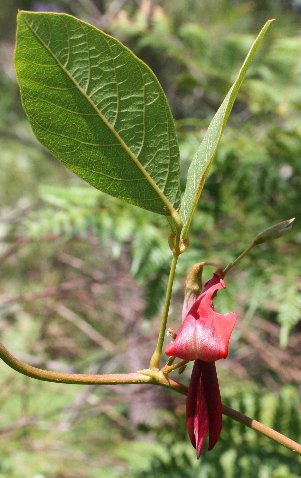
Kennedia rubicunda, Wolli Creek, Sydney, NSW

Kennedia is a genus of thirteen species of flowering plants in the pea family Fabaceae and is endemic to Australia. Plants in this genus are prostrate or climbing perennials with trifoliate leaves and large, showy, pea-like flowers. There are species in all Australian states.

== Description ==
Plants in the genus Kennedia are prostrate or climbing perennials that usually have softly-hairy foliage and a stem that is woody at the base. The leaves are arranged alternately along the stems and are usually trifoliate with stipules at the base of the petiole and small stipellae at the base of the leaflets. The flowers are arranged in leaf axils, relatively large and showy, red, blue, violet or almost black with stipule-like bracts at the base but that sometimes fall of as the flowers open. The five sepals are joined to form a bell-shaped tube with five teeth about the same length as the tube, the upper two partly fused. The standard petal is more or less round, the wings are sickle-shaped and the keel curves inwards. Nine of the lower stamens are fused into an open sheath and the style is thread-like. The fruit is a flattened or cylindrical pod.

== Taxonomy ==
The genus Kennedia was first formally described in 1805 by Étienne Pierre Ventenat in his book, Jardin de la Malmaison. The name Kennedia honours John Kennedy, a partner in the firm of nurserymen, Lee and Kennedy of Hammersmith, London.

== Species list ==
The following is a list of Kennedia species accepted by the Australian Plant Census as of October 2021:

- Kennedia beckxiana F.Muell. – Cape Arid kennedia (W.A.)
- Kennedia carinata (Benth.) Van Houtte (W.A.)
- Kennedia coccinea (Curtis) Vent. – coral vine (W.A.)
  - Kennedia coccinea subsp. calcaria Lally
  - Kennedia coccinea (Curtis) Vent. subsp. coccinea
  - Kennedia coccinea subsp. esotera Lally
- Kennedia glabrata Lindl. – Northcliffe kennedia (W.A.)
- Kennedia lateritia F.Muell. (W.A., possibly naturalised in Vic.)
- Kennedia microphylla Meisn. (W.A.)
- Kennedia nigricans Lindl. – black coral pea (W.A., possibly naturalised in S.A. and Tas.)
- Kennedia procurrens Benth. – purple running pea (Qld., N.S.W.)
- Kennedia prorepens (F.Muell.) F.Muell. (W.A., N.T., S.A., Qld.)
- Kennedia prostrata R.Br. – running postman (W.A., S.A., N.S.W., Vic., Tas.)
- Kennedia retrorsa Hemsl. (N.S.W.)
- Kennedia rubicunda (Schneev.) Vent. – dusky coral pea (Qld., N.S.W., Vic.)
- Kennedia stirlingii R.Br. – bushy kennedia (W.A.)

== Use in horticulture ==
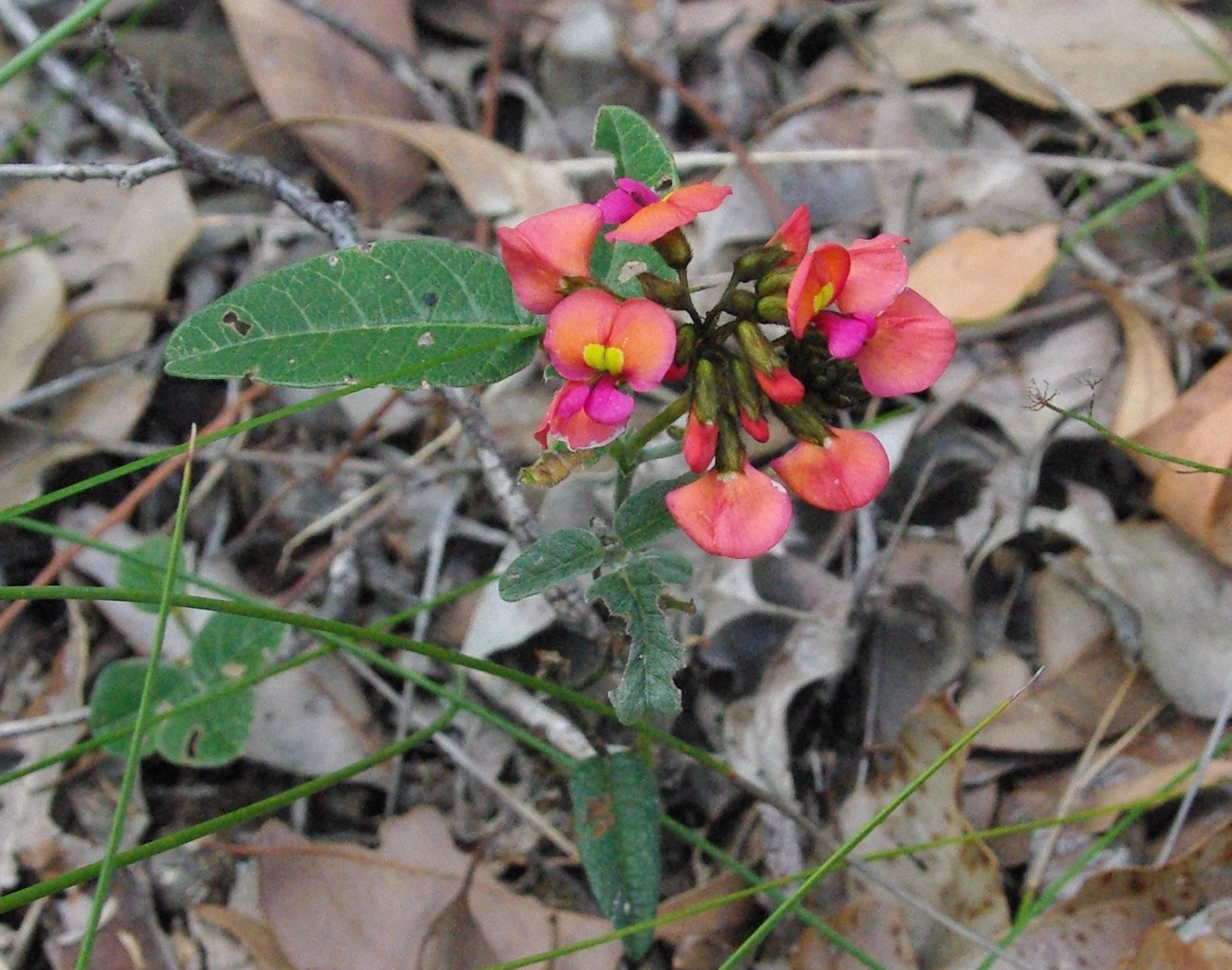
Kennedia coccinea in Glen Forrest, Western Australia

Kennedias are frost-tolerant with a preference for light, well-drained soil in full sun. Once established they will spread into shaded areas. Western Australian species are heat-tolerant and make good covers for sheds, fences and walls with support. Many kennedias are vigorous climbers; K. rubicunda (commonly used in revegetation projects around Sydney, where it is indigenous) and K. nigricans can cover up to five metres of wall from tube in nine months. The most popular species in cultivation, K. prostrata, is a much less vigorous groundcover plant.

They are propagated from seed during spring; in the warmer summer months they are easily propagated from cuttings. This robust genus can be heavily cut back after flowering to prevent invasive growth.
