= Biodiversity Conservation Act 2016 =

Biodiversity Conservation Act 2016 may refer to:

- Biodiversity Conservation Act 2016 (WA)
- Biodiversity Conservation Act 2016 (NSW)
