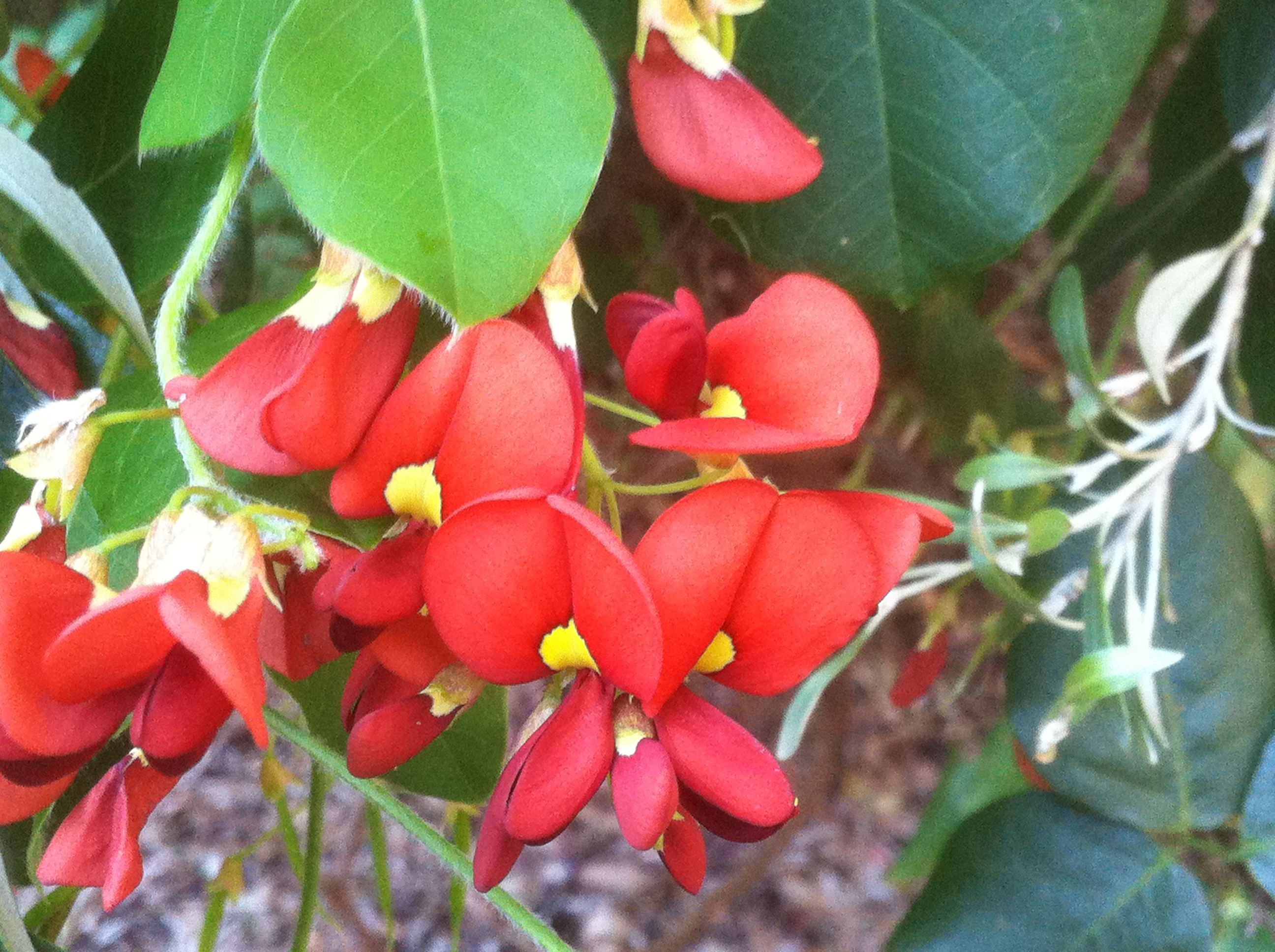

Conservation status
- Endangered (EPBC Act)

Scientific classification
- Kingdom: Plantae
- Clade: Tracheophytes
- Clade: Angiosperms
- Clade: Eudicots
- Clade: Rosids
- Order: Fabales
- Family: Fabaceae
- Subfamily: Faboideae
- Genus: Kennedia
- Species: K. lateritia

Binomial name
- Kennedia lateritia F.Muell.

Synonyms
- Kennedia macrophylla (Meisn.) Benth. nom. illeg.; Kennedia macrophylla (Meisn.) F.Muell nom. illeg.; Kennedya macrophylla Benth. orth. var.; Kennedya macrophylla F.Muell. orth. var.; Physolobium macrophyllum Meisn.

= Kennedia lateritia =

Species of legume

Kennedia lateritia, commonly known as Augusta kennedia, is a species of flowering plant in the family Fabaceae and is endemic to the south-west of Western Australia. It is a woody climber with twining stems, trifoliate leaves and orange-red and yellow flowers arranged in groups of up to twenty-four.

== Description ==
Kennedia lateritia is a woody climber with twining stems that cover low vegetation or sometimes climb trees to a height of up to 4 m (13 ft). Its leaves are trifoliate with elliptic, round or broadly egg-shaped leaflets 50–85 mm (2.0–3.3 in) long and 35–75 mm (1.4–3.0 in) wide, each leaf on a petiole 30–50 mm (1.2–2.0 in) long and the end leaflet on petiolule up to about 8 mm (0.31 in) long. There are stipules 15–20 mm (0.59–0.79 in) long at the base of the petiole. The flowers are arranged in up to eight clusters of three along a peduncle up to 100 mm (3.9 in) long, each flower on a pedicel about 8 mm (0.31 in) long. The five sepals are 6–7 mm (0.24–0.28 in) long and the petals are 15–18 mm (0.59–0.71 in) long. The standard petal is brick red with a yellow base and the wings are about the same length as the keel. Flowering occurs from October to November and the fruit is a cylindrical pod 40–50 mm (1.6–2.0 in) long and 6–10 mm (0.24–0.39 in) wide.

== Taxonomy ==
Kennedia lateritia was first formally described in 1864 by Ferdinand von Mueller in Fragmenta Phytographiae Australiae. The specific epithet (lateritia) means "brick red".

== Distribution and habitat ==
Augusta kennedia grows in low coastal heath, often among granite outcrops in the Augusta-Cape Leeuwin area of south-western Western Australia.

== Conservation status ==
This species of twining pea is listed as "endangered" under the Australian Government Environment Protection and Biodiversity Conservation Act 1999 and as "Threatened Flora (Declared Rare Flora — Extant)" (as Kennedia macrophylla) by the Department of Biodiversity, Conservation and Attractions. The main threats to the species include trampling by tourists, inappropriate fire regimes and land clearing.
