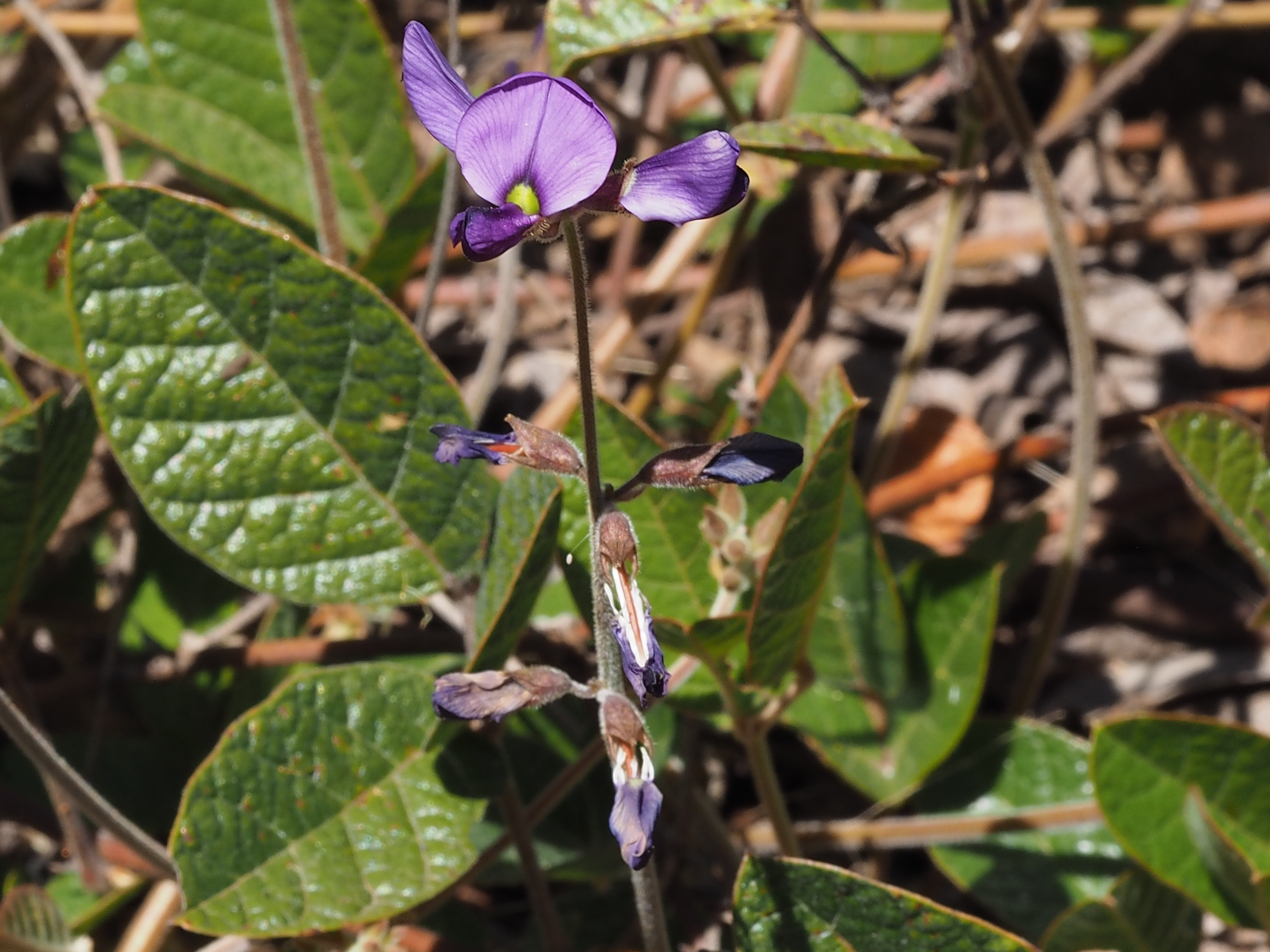
- Kennedia procurrens in the Pilliga Scrub

Scientific classification
- Kingdom: Plantae
- Clade: Tracheophytes
- Clade: Angiosperms
- Clade: Eudicots
- Clade: Rosids
- Order: Fabales
- Family: Fabaceae
- Subfamily: Faboideae
- Genus: Kennedia
- Species: K. procurrens

Binomial name
- Kennedia procurrens Benth.

= Kennedia procurrens =

Purple running pea

Species of legume

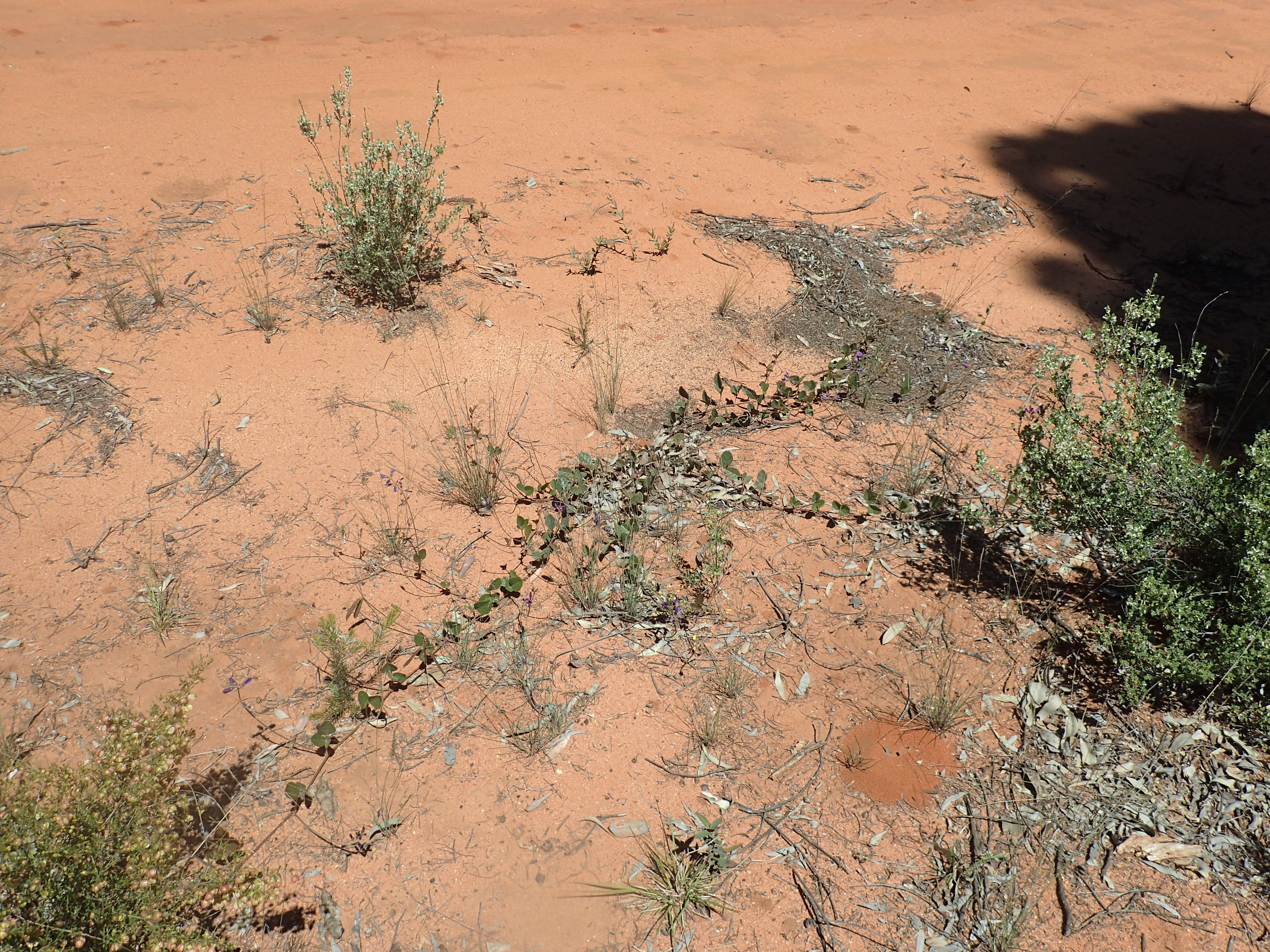
Habit

Kennedia procurrens, commonly known as the purple running pea, is a species of flowering plant in the family Fabaceae and is endemic to eastern Australia. It is a prostrate or climbing herb with trifoliate leaves and pale red to mauve or violet flowers.

== Description ==
Kennedia procurrens is a prostrate or climbing herb with softly-hairy stems 1–2 mm (0.039–0.079 in) long. The leaves are trifoliate with broadly egg-shaped or broadly elliptic leaves 20–50 mm (0.79–1.97 in) long and 10–35 mm (0.39–1.38 in) wide with egg-shaped stipules 4–6 mm (0.16–0.24 in) long at the base. The flower are pale red to mauve or violet, 10–15 mm (0.39–0.59 in) long and arranged in groups of two to ten on a flowering stem 10–40 mm (0.39–1.57 in) long, the flowers on peduncles 130 mm (5.1 in) long. Flowering occurs from late winter to summer and the fruit is a glabrous, cylindrical or flattened pod 50–60 mm (2.0–2.4 in) long.

== Taxonomy ==
Kennedia procurrens was first formally described in 1848 in Thomas Mitchell's Journal of an Expedition into the Interior of Tropical Australia. The specific epithet (procurrens) means "extending", "jutting out" or "projecting".

== Distribution and habitat ==
Purple running pea grows in woodland in sandy soil in southern Queensland and northern New South Wales as far south as Coonabarabran.
