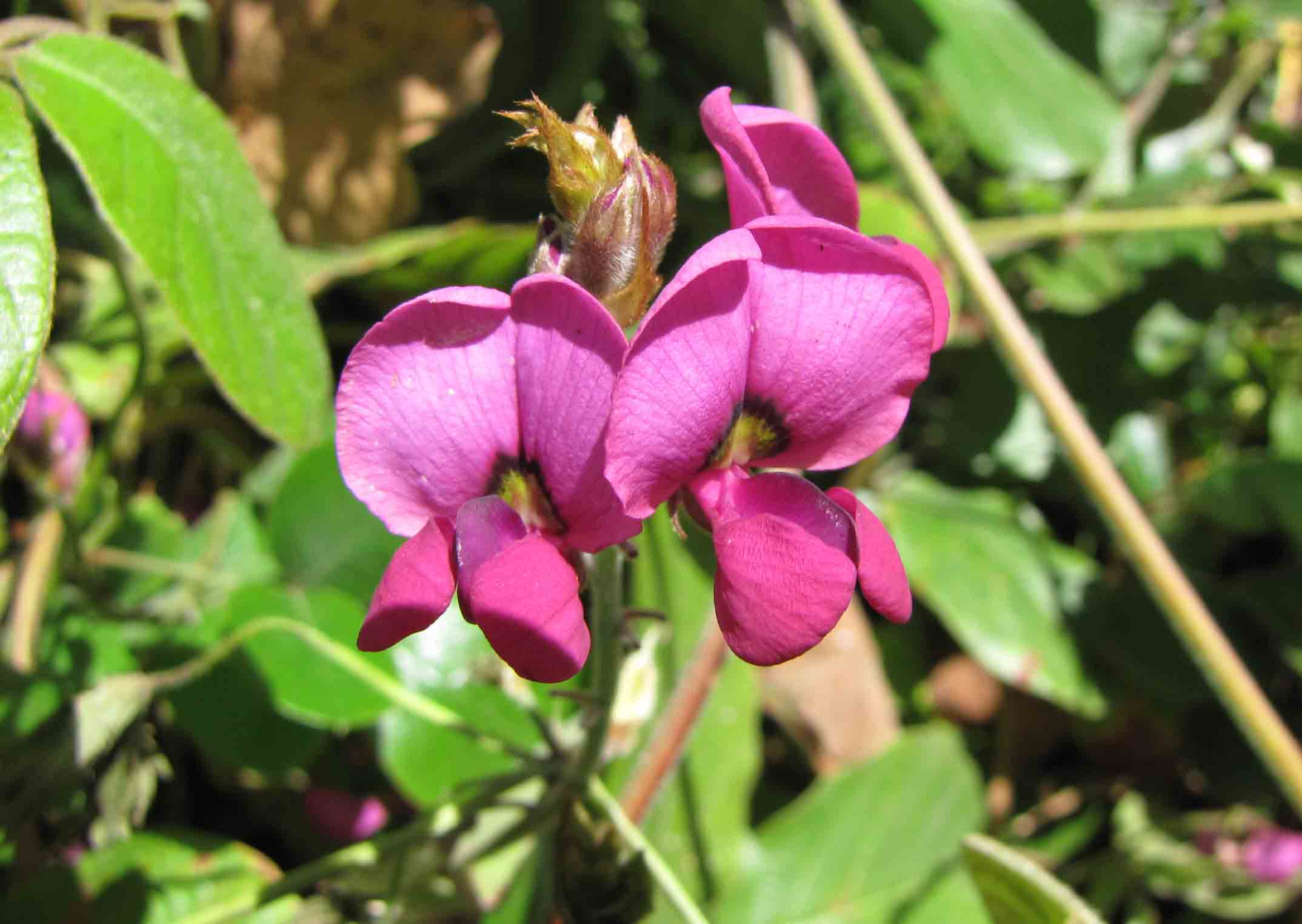
- In the Australian National Botanic Gardens

Conservation status
- Critically Endangered (IUCN 3.1)

- Vulnerable (EPBC Act)

Scientific classification
- Kingdom: Plantae
- Clade: Tracheophytes
- Clade: Angiosperms
- Clade: Eudicots
- Clade: Rosids
- Order: Fabales
- Family: Fabaceae
- Subfamily: Faboideae
- Genus: Kennedia
- Species: K. retrorsa

Binomial name
- Kennedia retrorsa Hemsl.

= Kennedia retrorsa =

Species of legume

Kennedia retrorsa is a species of flowering plant in the family Fabaceae and is endemic to New South Wales. It is a climbing herb with trifoliate leaves and pinkish-purple or scarlet flowers.

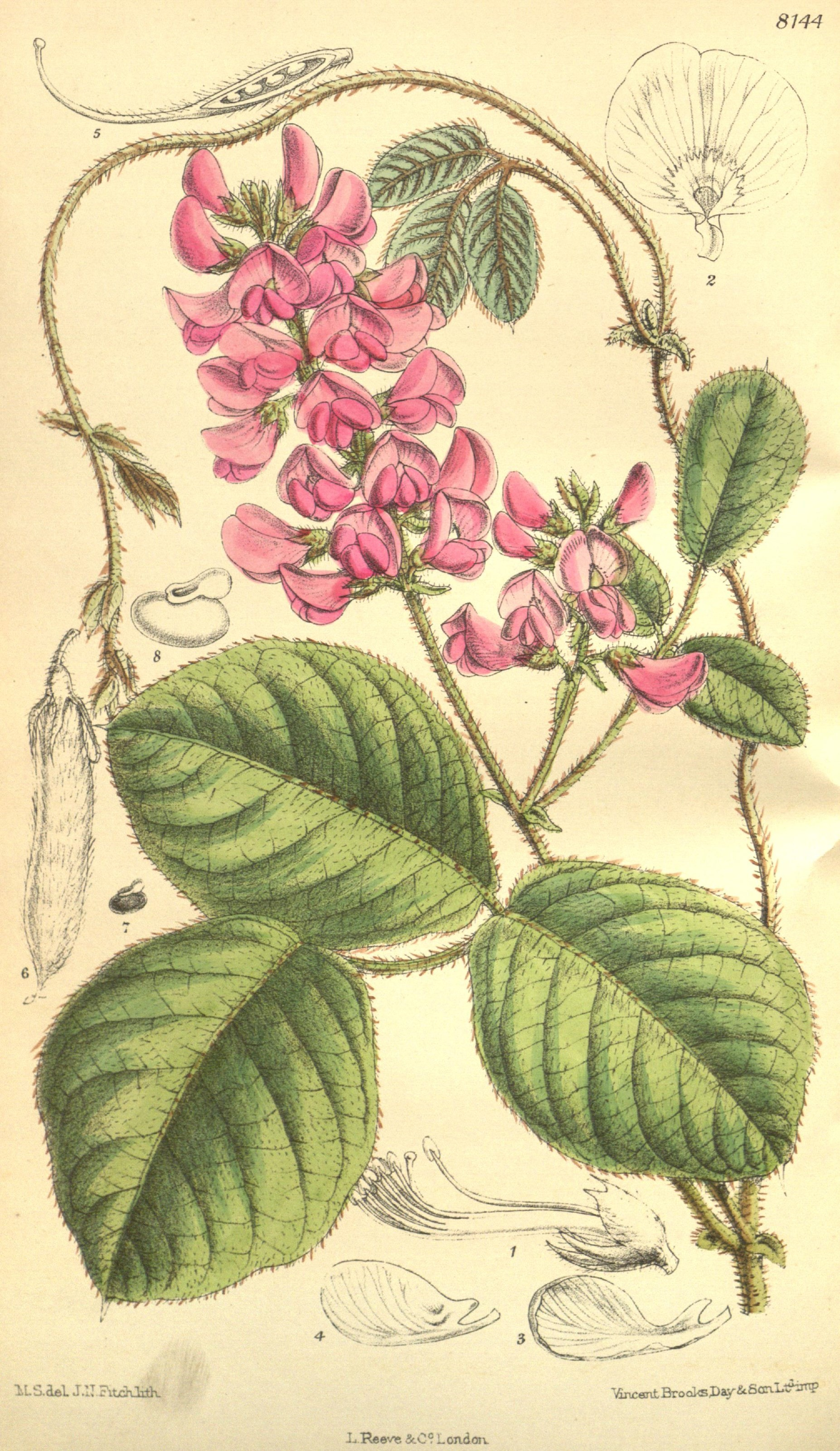
Illustration from Curtis's Botanical Magazine

== Description ==
Kennedia retrorsa is a vigorous climbing herb covered with rust-coloured or white hairs. The leaves are trifoliate with broadly elliptic to more or less circular leaflets 30–130 mm (1.2–5.1 in) long and 30–100 mm (1.2–3.9 in) wide with stipules about 5 mm (0.20 in) long at the base. The flowers are arranged in groups of four to twenty in racemes up to 250 mm (9.8 in) long on a peduncle 50–150 mm (2.0–5.9 in) long with lance-shaped bracts at the base. The sepals are 6–8 mm (0.24–0.31 in) long and the petals are pinkish-purple or scarlet and 12–15 mm (0.47–0.59 in) long, the standard petal more or less circular. Flowering mainly occurs from September to December and the fruit is a densely hairy, flattened pod about 60 mm (2.4 in) long.

== Taxonomy ==
Kennedia retrorsa was first formally described in 1907 by William Hemsley in Curtis's Botanical Magazine from specimens raised in Kew Gardens from seed "received from the Sydney Botanic Garden". The specific epithet (retrorsa) means "pointing backwards".

== Distribution and habitat ==
This kennedia is only known from the Goulburn River National Park where it grows in cool, damp and rocky places in a range of habitats, usually in sandy soil.

== Conservation status ==
Kennedia retrorsa is listed as a critically endangered species on the IUCN Red List and as vulnerable under the Australian Government Environment Protection and Biodiversity Conservation Act 1999 and the New South Wales Government Biodiversity Conservation Act 2016.
