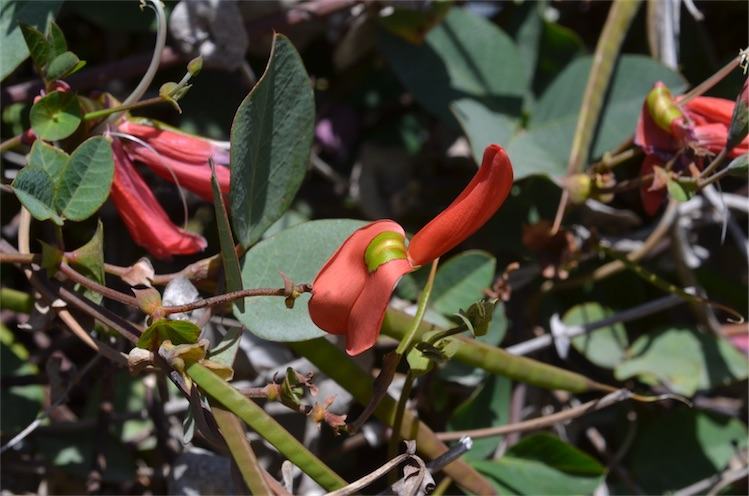
- Kennedia beckxiana in Royal Botanic Gardens, Cranbourne

Conservation status
- Priority Four — Rare Taxa (DEC)

Scientific classification
- Kingdom: Plantae
- Clade: Tracheophytes
- Clade: Angiosperms
- Clade: Eudicots
- Clade: Rosids
- Order: Fabales
- Family: Fabaceae
- Subfamily: Faboideae
- Genus: Kennedia
- Species: K. beckxiana

Binomial name
- Kennedia beckxiana F.Muell.

= Kennedia beckxiana =

Cape Arid kennedia

Species of legume

Kennedia beckxiana, commonly known as Cape Arid kennedia, is a species of flowering plant in the family Fabaceae and is endemic to the south-west of Western Australia. It is a prostrate or twining shrub or a climber with trifoliate leaves and red and yellow, pea-like flowers.

== Description ==
Kennedia beckxiana is a prostrate or twining shrub or a climber. Its leaves are trifoliate with stipules at the base of the petiole. The flowers are arranged on a hairy pedicel 8.0–8.5 mm (0.31–0.33 in) long. The five sepals are hairy and 9.5–11 mm (0.37–0.43 in) long, the standard petal red with a yellow base and up to 34 mm (1.3 in) long, the wings 30–35 mm (1.2–1.4 in) long, and the keel 28–30 mm (1.1–1.2 in) long. Flowering occurs from September to December and the fruit is a flattened pod 80–90 mm (3.1–3.5 in) long and 5–7 mm (0.20–0.28 in) wide.

== Taxonomy and naming ==
Kennedia beckxiana was first formally described in 1880 by Ferdinand von Mueller in Fragmenta phytographiae Australiae from specimens collected by William Webb near King George's Sound. The specific epithet (beckxiana) honours Gustav Beckx, a Belgian consul-general.

== Distribution and habitat ==
Cape Arid kennedia grows on granite hills and outcrops in the Esperance Plains, Mallee and Swan Coastal Plain biogeographic regions of south-western Western Australia.

== Conservation status ==
Kennedia beckxiana is classified as "Priority Four" by the Government of Western Australia Department of Biodiversity, Conservation and Attractions, meaning that is rare or near threatened.
