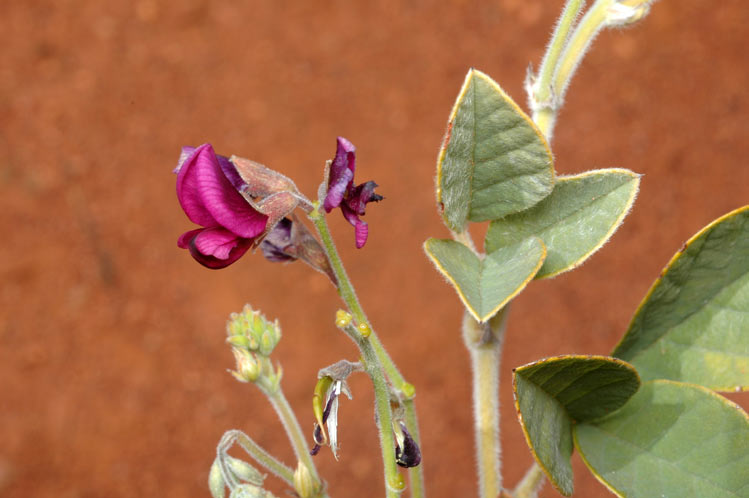
- In the Collier Range National Park

Scientific classification
- Kingdom: Plantae
- Clade: Tracheophytes
- Clade: Angiosperms
- Clade: Eudicots
- Clade: Rosids
- Order: Fabales
- Family: Fabaceae
- Subfamily: Faboideae
- Genus: Kennedia
- Species: K. prorepens

Binomial name
- Kennedia prorepens (F.Muell.) F.Muell.

= Kennedia prorepens =

Species of flowering plant

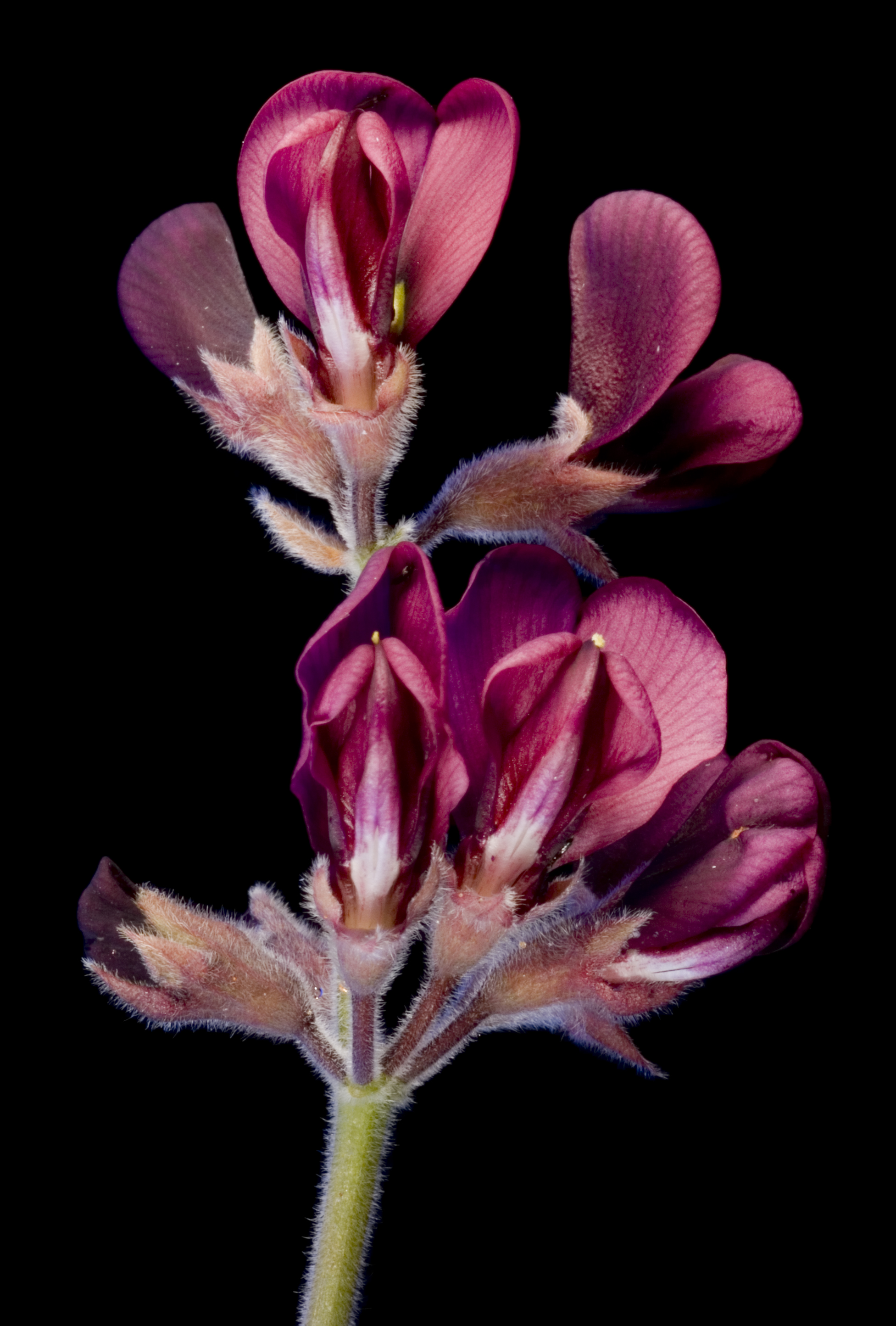
Flower detail

Kennedia prorepens is a species of flowering plant in the family Fabaceae and is endemic to Australia. It is a prostrate, multi-stemmed shrub with trifoliate leaves and pale blue, violet or maroon flowers.

== Description ==
Kennedia prorepens is a prostrate, multi-stemmed herb, the stems up to 0.5 mm (0.020 in) long. The leaves are trifoliate on a petiole 5–20 mm (0.20–0.79 in) long with broadly egg-shaped to wedge-shaped leaflets 7–30 mm (0.28–1.18 in) long and 7–20 mm (0.28–0.79 in) wide on petiolules 2–7 mm (0.079–0.276 in) long. The flower are pale red, violet or maroon, 10–15 mm (0.39–0.59 in) long and arranged in clusters of up to four 50–200 mm (2.0–7.9 in) long, each cluster with two to twelve or more flowers and each flower on a hairy pedicel 1.5–3 mm (0.059–0.118 in) long. The sepals are 5.5–7.0 mm (0.22–0.28 in) long, joined at the base forming a bell-shaped tube. The standard petal is 9.5–15 mm (0.37–0.59 in) long, the wings 9–12 mm (0.35–0.47 in) long and the keel 10–12 mm (0.39–0.47 in) long. Flowering occurs from April to November and the fruit is a glabrous flattened pod 28–33 mm (1.1–1.3 in) long.

== Taxonomy ==
This species was first formally described in 1874 by Ferdinand von Mueller, who gave it the name Caulinia prorepens in Fragmenta Phytographiae Australiae. In 1882, von Mueller changed the name to Kennedia prorepens. The specific epithet (prorepens) means "forwards-creeping".

== Distribution and habitat ==
Kennedia prorepens is widespread in Western Australia, its range extending to the south of the Northern Territory, north-western South Australia and western Queensland.
