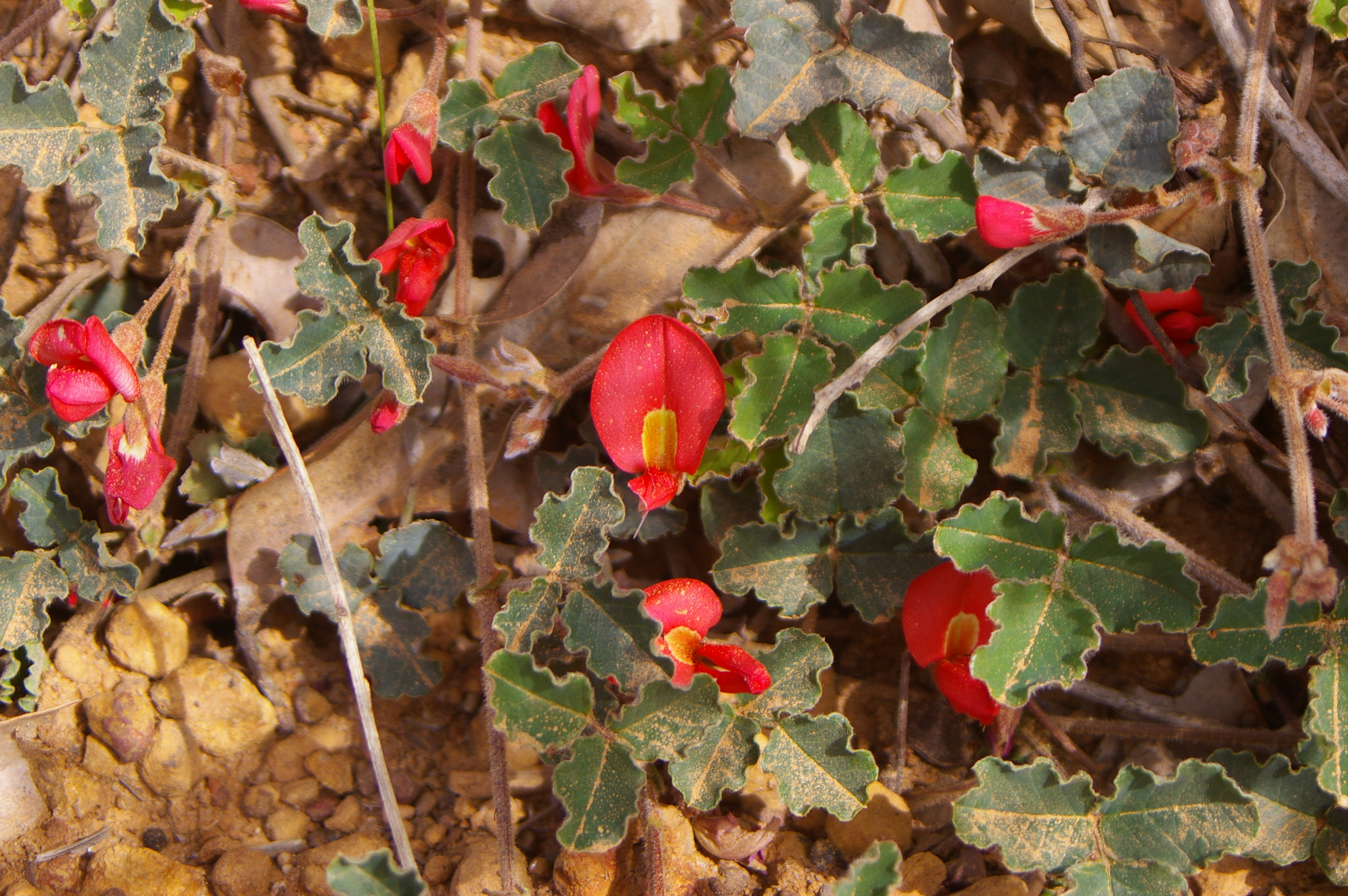
- Kennedia prostrata in Drummond Nature Reserve.

Scientific classification
- Kingdom: Plantae
- Clade: Tracheophytes
- Clade: Angiosperms
- Clade: Eudicots
- Clade: Rosids
- Order: Fabales
- Family: Fabaceae
- Subfamily: Faboideae
- Genus: Kennedia
- Species: K. prostrata

Binomial name
- Kennedia prostrata R.Br.
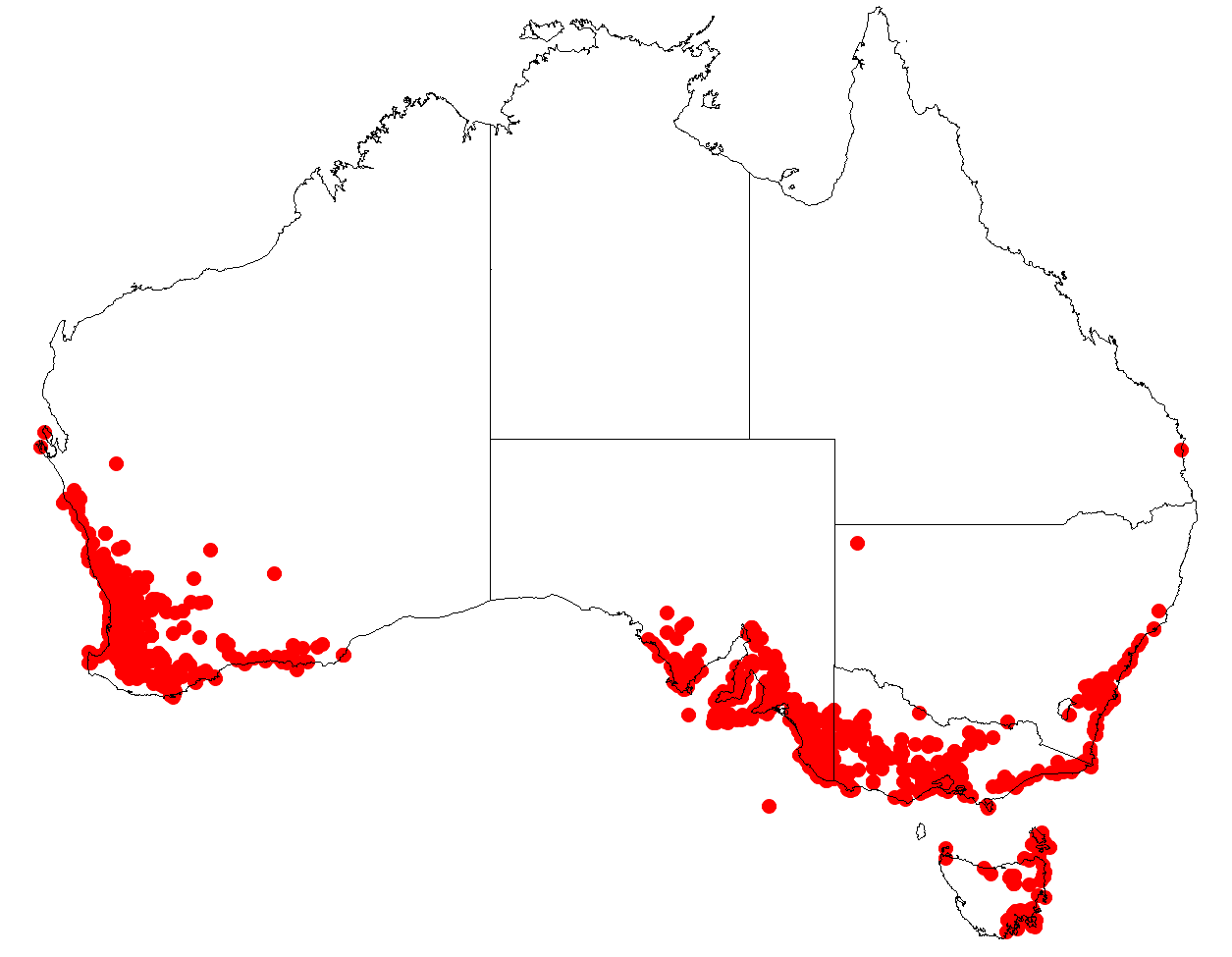
- Occurrence data from AVH

Synonyms
- List: Caulinia prostrata (R.Br.) F.Muell.; Kennedia marryatae Lindl.; Kennedia marryatiana Benth. nom. illeg., nom. superfl.; Kennedia marryattae Lindl. orth. var.; Kennedia prostrata f. major (DC.) Siebert & Voss; Kennedia prostrata R.Br. f. prostrata; Kennedia prostrata var. major DC.; Kennedia prostrata var. minor G.Don; Kennedia prostrata R.Br. var. prostrata; Kennedia stipularis Desv.; Kennedya marryattae Benth. orth. var.; Kennedya marryattiana Benth. orth. var.; Kennedya prostrata F.Muell. orth. var.; Kennedya prostrata f. major Siebert & Voss orth. var.; Kennedya prostrata var. alba Guilf. nom. inval., nom. nud.; Kennedya prostrata var. major DC. orth. var.; Kennedya prostrata var. minor G.Don orth. var.

= Kennedia prostrata =

Running postman

Species of plant

Kennedia prostrata, commonly known as running postman, scarlet coral pea or scarlet runner, is a species of flowering plant in the family Fabaceae and is endemic to Australia. It is a prostrate or twining shrub with trifoliate leaves and, usually, red flowers.

== Description ==
Kennedia prostrata is a prostrate or twining shrub with wiry stems up to 2 m (6 ft 7 in) long that are hairy when young. The leaves are on a petiole vary from 5 to 50 mm (0.20 to 1.97 in) long, with more or less round leaflets, which are from 6 to 35 mm (0.24 to 1.38 in) long and wide with wavy edges. The end leaflet on a petiolule is from 2 to 9 mm (0.079 to 0.354 in) long, but the side leaflets more or less sessile. There is a heart-shaped stipule about 5 mm (0.20 in) long at the base of the petiole.

The flowers are borne singly or in pairs on a peduncle from 5 to 30 mm (0.20 to 1.18 in) long, with bracts from 2 to 5 mm (0.079 to 0.197 in) long at the base, the individual flowers on pedicels being from 5 to 25 mm (0.20 to 0.98 in) long. The five sepals are hairy, from 6 to 8 mm (0.24 to 0.31 in) in length, and the petals are usually scarlet, rarely white. The standard petal is from 13 to 23 mm (0.51 to 0.91 in) long, the wings from 12 to 18 mm (0.47 to 0.71 in) long, and the keel from 12 to 22 mm (0.47 to 0.87 in) long. Flowering occurs from April to November, and the fruit is a flattened cylindrical pod from 20 to 50 mm (0.79 to 1.97 in) in length.

== Taxonomy ==
Kennedia prostrata was first formally described by Robert Brown in 1812 in Hortus Kewensis. The specific epithet (prostrata) means "prostrate".

== Distribution and habitat ==
Running postman occurs in all Australian states and territories, except Queensland and the Northern Territory, and grows in a variety of habitats, often on coastal sand dunes and on rock outcrops.

== Use in horticulture ==
The species is naturally adapted to sandy or lighter soils and prefers a sunny position. A widely cultivated species, it grows in temperate to subtropical areas and is hardy in most situations.
