= Biodiversity Conservation Act 2016 (WA) =

Act of the Western Australian Parliament

Parliament of Western Australia
- Long title: An Act to provide for the conservation and protection of biodiversity and biodiversity components in Western Australia; and the ecologically sustainable use of biodiversity components in Western Australia; and the repeal of the Wildlife Conservation Act 1950 and the Sandalwood Act 1929; and consequential amendments to other Acts, and for related purposes.
- Citation: No. 24 of 2016
- Royal assent: 21 September 2016

The Biodiversity Conservation Act 2016 is a state-based act of parliament in Western Australia (WA). It came into force on 1 January 2019. This Act 2016 and its Regulations replace the Sandalwood Act 1929 and the Wildlife Conservation Act 1950, and establish a new framework for the conservation and protection of biodiversity in Western Australia. Unlike the previous legislation, it covers both species and ecological communities, and creates criteria for different types listings, including listing species as "endangered", "critically endangered" or "vulnerable". This brings WA in line with the Environment Protection and Biodiversity Conservation Act 1999.
