= Isonym =

Term in botanical nomenclature

An isonym, in botanical taxonomy, is a name of a taxon that is identical to another designation, and based on the same type, but published at a different time by different authors. Citation from that source follows:

When the same name, based on the same type, has been published independently at different times by different authors, then only the earliest of these "isonyms" has nomenclatural status. The name is always to be cited from its original place of valid publication, and later isonyms may be disregarded.

That is, the later isonyms are to be discarded (they are not botanical names), and only the first one is to be used (though it is not necessarily the accepted name for a taxon).

An exception is made for family names that have been conserved; the place of publication listed for those names is considered to be correct and the name valid (and legitimate), even if an earlier publication of the same name is discovered.

== See also ==
- Basionym – Scientific name on which another scientific name is based
- Homonym (biology) – Scientific name that is identical in spelling to a name with a different type
- Isotype (biology) – Example of an organism used to describe its species, a duplicate of the holotype (not the type of an isonym)
