= Reed-leaf wattle =

Reed-leaf wattle is a common name for several plants and may refer to:

- Acacia calamifolia
- Acacia euthycarpa, endemic to southern Australia
