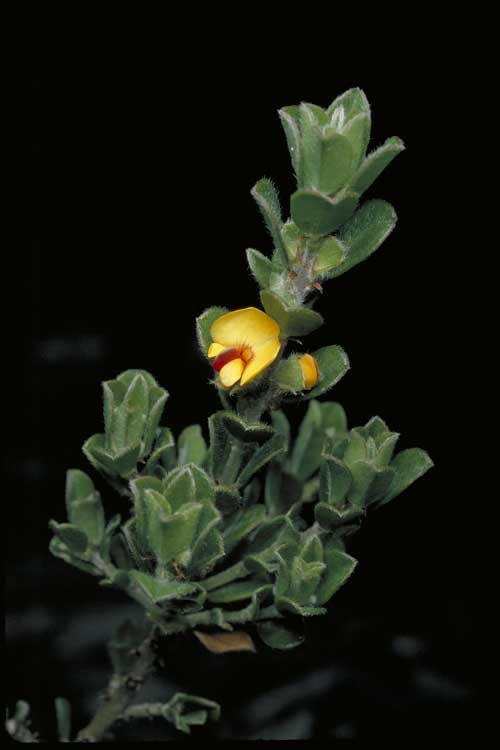
- In the Australian National Botanic Gardens

Scientific classification
- Kingdom: Plantae
- Clade: Tracheophytes
- Clade: Angiosperms
- Clade: Eudicots
- Clade: Rosids
- Order: Fabales
- Family: Fabaceae
- Subfamily: Faboideae
- Genus: Pultenaea
- Species: P. heterochila

Binomial name
- Pultenaea heterochila F.Muell.

= Pultenaea heterochila =

Species of flowering plant

Pultenaea heterochila is a species of flowering plant in the family Fabaceae and is endemic to the south of Western Australia. It is an erect, low-lying or prostrate shrub with hairy leaves and yellow and red flowers.

== Description ==
Pultenaea heterochila is an erect, low-lying or prostrate shrub that typically grows to a height of up to 1.8 m (5 ft 11 in) and has hairy stems. The leaves are flat and hairy, 5–12 mm (0.20–0.47 in) long and 3–8.2 mm (0.12–0.32 in) wide with stipules 1–2.7 mm (0.039–0.106 in) long at the base. The flowers are arranged on pedicels 3.5–5 mm (0.14–0.20 in) long, and the sepals are 6–8 mm (0.24–0.31 in) long with bracteoles 1.7–2.4 mm (0.067–0.094 in) long at the base. The standard petal is yellow, 7–9.7 mm (0.28–0.38 in) long, the wings 6.0–8.5 mm (0.24–0.33 in) long and the keel is red and 7.2–9.0 mm (0.28–0.35 in) long. Flowering occurs from May to September and the fruit is a pod.

== Taxonomy and naming ==
This species was first formally described in 1811 by Robert Brown who gave it the name Euchilus obcordatus in William Aiton's Hortus Kewensis. In 1863, Ferdinand von Mueller changed the name to Pultenaea heterochila in Fragmenta phytographiae Australiae, the name Pultenaea obcordata having been used by Henry Cranke Andrews for a different taxon, now known as Pultenaea daphnoides J.C.Wendl. The specific epithet (heterochila) means "unequal-lipped", referring to the sepal lobes.

== Distribution ==
This pultenaea grows in sandy soil over limestone in the Avon Wheatbelt, Coolgardie, Esperance Plains, Hampton, Jarrah Forest, Mallee and Warren biogeographic regions of southern Western Australia.

== Conservation status ==
Pultenaea heterochila is classified as "not threatened" by the Government of Western Australia Department of Parks and Wildlife.
