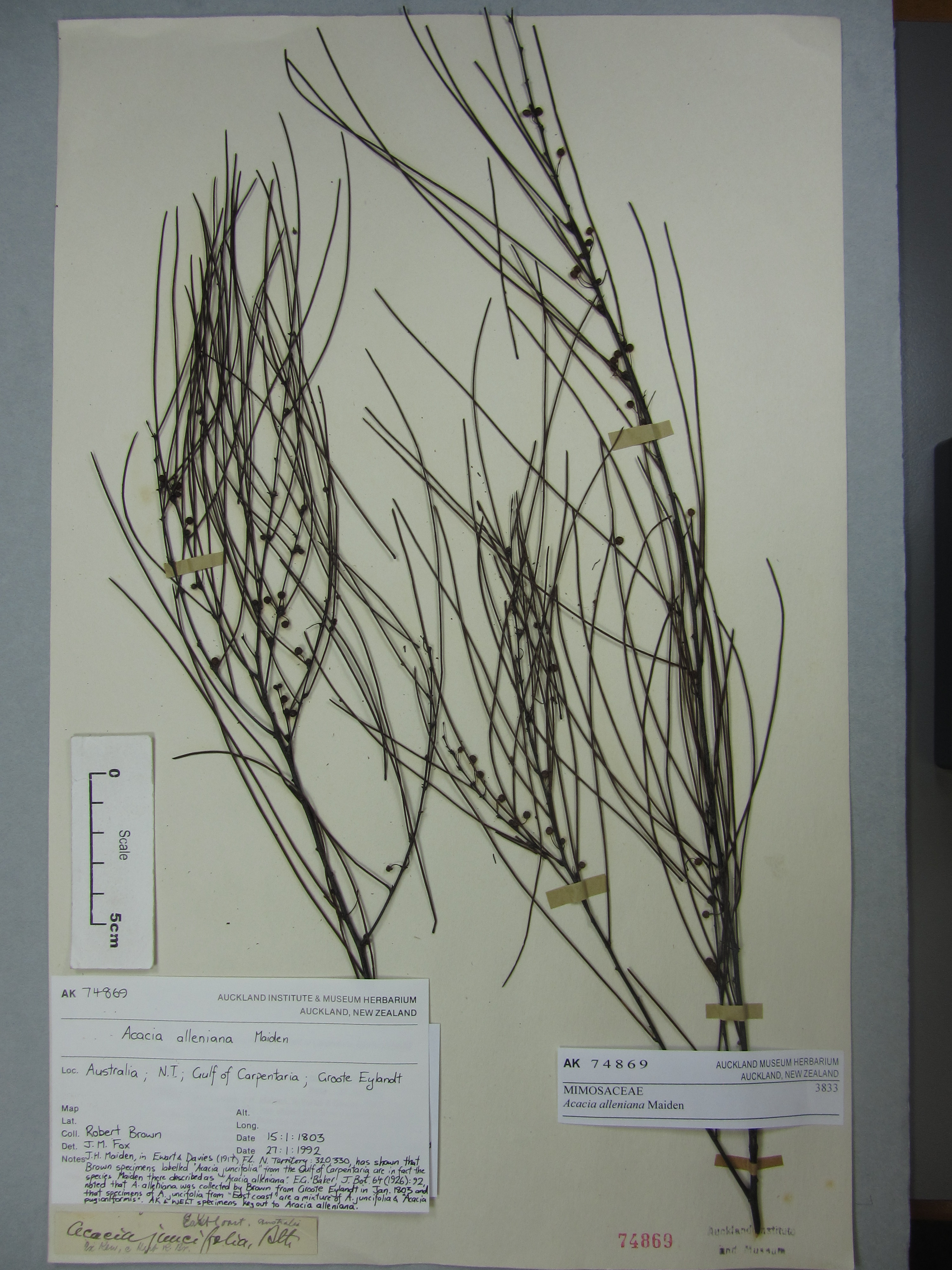

Conservation status
- Least Concern (IUCN 3.1)

Scientific classification
- Kingdom: Plantae
- Clade: Embryophytes
- Clade: Tracheophytes
- Clade: Spermatophytes
- Clade: Angiosperms
- Clade: Eudicots
- Clade: Rosids
- Order: Fabales
- Family: Fabaceae
- Subfamily: Caesalpinioideae
- Clade: Mimosoid clade
- Genus: Acacia
- Species: A. alleniana

Binomial name
- Acacia alleniana Maiden
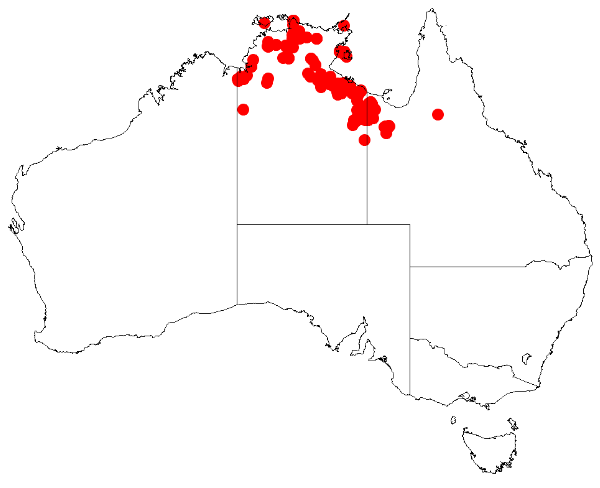
- Occurrence data from AVH

Synonyms
- Acacia tenuissima F.Muell. nom. inval., pro syn.; Racosperma allenianum (Maiden) Pedley; Acacia juncifolia auct. non Benth.: Bentham, G. (5 October 1864)

= Acacia alleniana =

Species of legume

Acacia alleniana is a species of flowering plant in the family Fabaceae and is endemic to northern parts of Australia. It is a spindly, open shrub or tree with slender branchlets, thread-like phyllodes, and yellow flowers arranged in 2 to 6 spherical heads in the axils of phyllodes, and thinly leathery pods up to 150 mm (5.9 in) long.

== Description ==
Acacia alleniana is a spindly, open shrub or tree that typically grows to a height of around 5 m (16 ft) and has glabrous, dark reddish-brown branchlets, sometimes pendulous branches. The phyllodes are thread-like, cylindrical to quadrangular in cross-section, 120–240 mm (4.7–9.4 in) long and 0.5–0.8 mm (0.020–0.031 in) wide. The flowers are borne in 2 to 6 more or less spherical heads 6–13 mm (0.24–0.51 in) in diameter on peduncles 6–13 mm (0.24–0.51 in) long, each head with about 35 yellow flowers. Flowering occurs from February to April, and the pods are thinly leathery, linear, up to 15 mm (0.59 in) long, 2.0–2.5 mm (0.079–0.098 in) wide and raised over the seeds. The seeds are brown, oblong to elliptic, and 4.0–5.5 mm (0.16–0.22 in) long.

== Taxonomy ==
Acacia alleniana was first formally described in 1917 Joseph Maiden in The Flora of the Northern Territory from specimens collected in 1912. The specific epithet (alleniana) honours Charles Ernest Frank Allen, a former curator of the Darwin Botanical Gardens.

This species is closely related to Acacia jasperensis and Acacia juncifolia.

== Distribution ==
Acacia alleniana is native in the Northern Territory from around Darwin, south and east in Arnhem Land and on many of the islands in the Gulf of Carpentaria. Its range extends into far north-western Queensland where it is found on hills and sandstone slopes growing in skeletal sandy soils.

== See also ==
- List of Acacia species
