= Port Clinton =

Port Clinton is the name of several places in the United States:

- Port Clinton, Ohio
- Port Clinton, Pennsylvania

Outside the continental US:

- Port Clinton, Queensland, in Australia
- Clinton, South Australia, often referred to as Port Clinton in Australia
