= Loricobbia =

Scientific classification
- Kingdom: Plantae
- Clade: Tracheophytes
- Clade: Angiosperms
- Clade: Eudicots
- Clade: Rosids
- Order: Fabales
- Family: Fabaceae
- Subfamily: Faboideae
- Clade: Mirbelioids
- Genus: Loricobbia; R.L.Barrett, Clugston & Orthia

Genus of flowering plants

Loricobbia is a genus of flowering plants in the family Fabaceae. It includes six species native to Southwest Australia.

== Species ==
Six species are accepted.

- Loricobbia aspalathoides (Meisn.) R.L.Barrett & T.D.Macfarl.
- Loricobbia ochreata (Meisn.) R.L.Barrett & T.D.Macfarl.
- Loricobbia pauciflora (M.B.Scott) R.L.Barrett & T.D.Macfarl.
- Loricobbia pinifolia (Meisn.) R.L.Barrett & T.D.Macfarl.
- Loricobbia reticulata (Sm.) R.L.Barrett & T.D.Macfarl.
- Loricobbia skinneri (F.Muell.) R.L.Barrett & T.D.Macfarl.

== Taxonomy ==
The species were formerly included in Pultenaea. Phylogenetic studies found Pultenaea to be paraphyletic relative to several other mirbelioid genera. Russell L. Barrett et al. analysed recent phylogenetic data on Pultenaea species and found five distinct lineages, which the authors recognised as distinct genera – Pultenaea sensu stricto, the reinstated Euchilus, and the newly described genera Grievea, Jennata, and Loricobbia.
