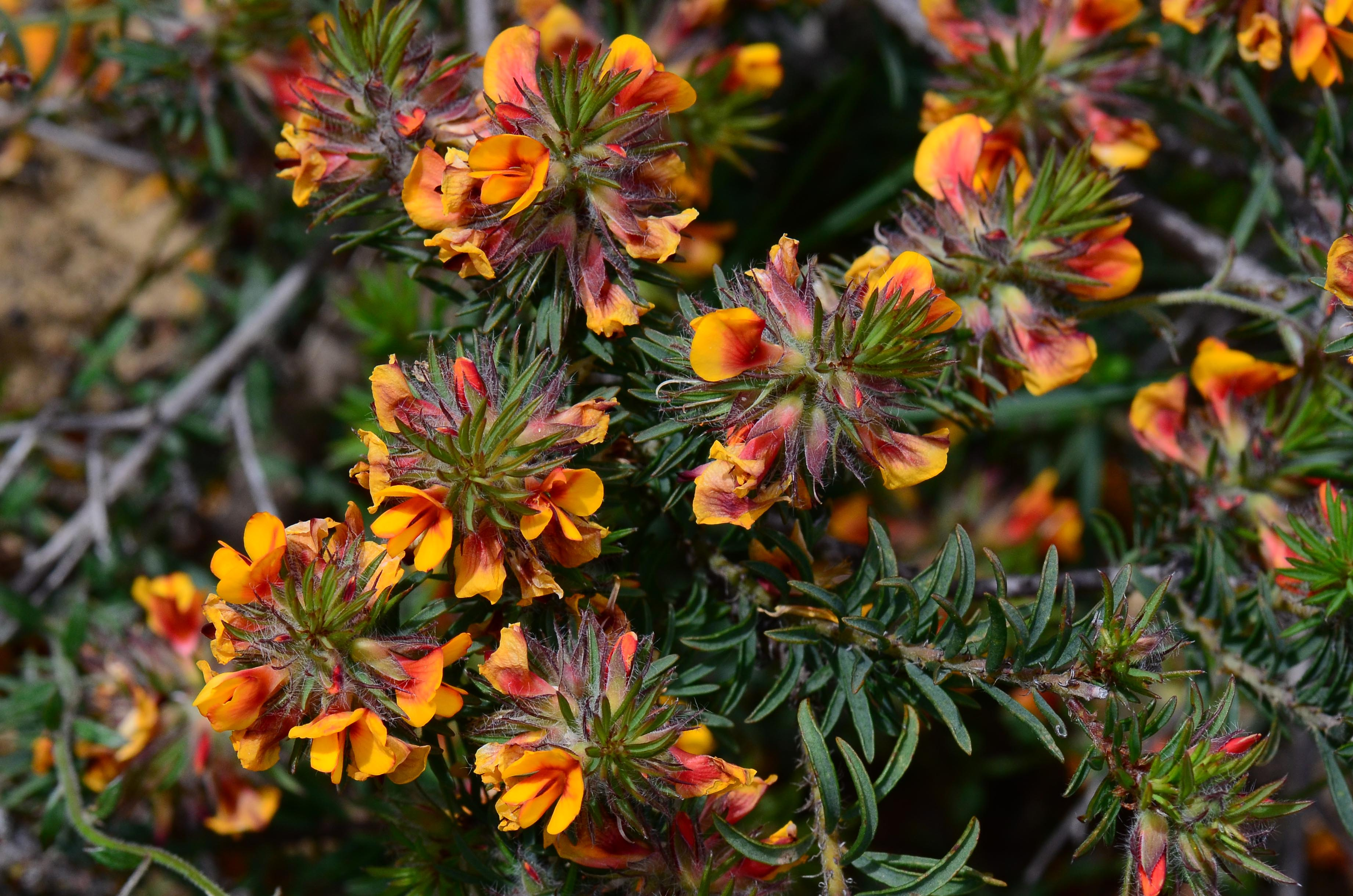
- Pultenaea humilis in the Grampians National Park

Scientific classification
- Kingdom: Plantae
- Clade: Tracheophytes
- Clade: Angiosperms
- Clade: Eudicots
- Clade: Rosids
- Order: Fabales
- Family: Fabaceae
- Subfamily: Faboideae
- Genus: Pultenaea
- Species: P. humilis

Binomial name
- Pultenaea humilis Benth. ex Hook.f.

Synonyms
- Pultenaea humilis var. glabrescens H.B.Will.; Pultenaea humilis Benth. ex Hook.f. var. humilis

= Pultenaea humilis =

Dwarf bush-pea

Species of flowering plant

Pultenaea humilis, commonly known as dwarf bush-pea, is a species of flowering plant in the family Fabaceae and is endemic to south-eastern Australia. It is a spreading, often low-lying shrub with branches that are hairy when young, elliptic to lance-shaped leaves with the narrower end towards the base, and yellow to orange and red flowers.

== Description ==
Pultenaea humilis is a spreading, often low-lying or prostrate shrub that typically grows to a height of about 20–80 cm (7.9–31.5 in) and has branches 15–30 cm (5.9–11.8 in) long and hairy when young. The leaves are arranged alternately, elliptic to lance-shaped leaves with the narrower end towards the base, 4–16 mm (0.16–0.63 in) long and 1.0–4.5 mm (0.039–0.177 in) wide with lance-shaped stipules 1–3.0 mm (0.039–0.118 in) long at the base. The edges of the leaves curve upwards and the upper surface is paler than the lower surface. The flowers are arranged singly in leaf axils in clusters near the ends of branches. They are 10–13 mm (0.39–0.51 in) long on pedicels about 0.5 mm (0.020 in) long with linear to triangular bracteoles 6.5–8 mm (0.26–0.31 in) long attached to the side of the sepal tube. The sepals are 7–11 mm (0.28–0.43 in) long, the standard petal yellow to orange with a red base and 8–10 mm (0.31–0.39 in) wide, the wings are yellow to red and the keel yellow to reddish-brown. Flowering occurs from October to December and the fruit is an egg-shaped pod 4–5 mm (0.16–0.20 in) long.

== Taxonomy and naming ==
Pultenaea humilis was first formally described in 1856 by Joseph Dalton Hooker in The Botany of the Antarctic voyage of H.M. Discovery ships Erebus and Terror. III. Flora Tasmaniae, based on an unpublished description by George Bentham. The specific epithet (humilis) means "low" or "small".

== Distribution and habitat ==
Dwarf bush-pea grows in heath, woodland and forest and is found in scattered populations on the south-western slopes of New South Wales, and the northern midlands of Tasmania. It is widespread and relatively common in central and western areas on and south of the Great Dividing Range in Victoria.

== Conservation status ==
Pultenaea humilis is relatively common in Victoria, but is listed as "vulnerable" in New South Wales under the New South Wales Government Biodiversity Conservation Act and as "vulnerable" in Tasmania under the Tasmanian Government Threatened Species Protection Act 1995.
