= P. densifolia =

P. densifolia may refer to:

- Pinanga densifolia, a flowering plant
- Pultenaea densifolia, a bush pea
