= Pultenaea bracteamajor =

Scientific classification
- Kingdom: Plantae
- Clade: Tracheophytes
- Clade: Angiosperms
- Clade: Eudicots
- Clade: Rosids
- Order: Fabales
- Family: Fabaceae
- Subfamily: Faboideae
- Genus: Pultenaea
- Species: P. bracteamajor

Binomial name
- Pultenaea bracteamajor de Kok

Species of flowering plant

Pultenaea bracteamajor is a species of flowering plant in the family Fabaceae and is endemic to Queensland. It is an erect shrub with cylindrical leaves and yellow to orange and red flowers.

== Description ==
Pultenaea bracteamajor is an erect shrub that typically grows to a height of 0.1–1.0 m (3.9 in – 3 ft 3.4 in) and has hairy branches. The leaves are round to u-shaped in cross-section, 5.5–16.5 mm (0.22–0.65 in) long and 1.0–1.8 mm (0.039–0.071 in) wide on a petiole 1.2–3 mm (0.047–0.118 in) long. There are stipules 1.0–1.5 mm (0.039–0.059 in) long at the base and a sharp point on the tip. The flowers are arranged in groups on the ends of branchlets, the sepals 3.8–5 mm (0.15–0.20 in) long with leaf-like, linear to triangular bracteoles 1–1.5 mm (0.039–0.059 in) long at the base. The standard petal is yellow to orange and 7–9 mm (0.28–0.35 in) long, the wings yellow to orange and 5.5–7 mm (0.22–0.28 in) long and the keel is red to purple. Flowering occurs from August to January and the fruit is an oval pod about 6–7.5 mm (0.24–0.30 in) long.

== Taxonomy and naming ==
Pultenaea bracteamajor was first formally described in 2004 by Rogier Petrus Johannes de Kok in Australian Systematic Botany from specimens collected near Gayndah. The specific epithet (bracteamajor) refers to the bracts that are much larger than those of P. bracteaminor.

== Distribution and habitat ==
This pultenaea grows in the understorey of woodland and forest in the Burnett and Darling Downs regions of south-eastern Queensland.
