= Acacia serpentinicola =

Scientific classification
- Kingdom: Plantae
- Clade: Tracheophytes
- Clade: Angiosperms
- Clade: Eudicots
- Clade: Rosids
- Order: Fabales
- Family: Fabaceae
- Subfamily: Caesalpinioideae
- Clade: Mimosoid clade
- Genus: Acacia
- Species: A. serpentinicola

Binomial name
- Acacia serpentinicola (Maslin) Pedley
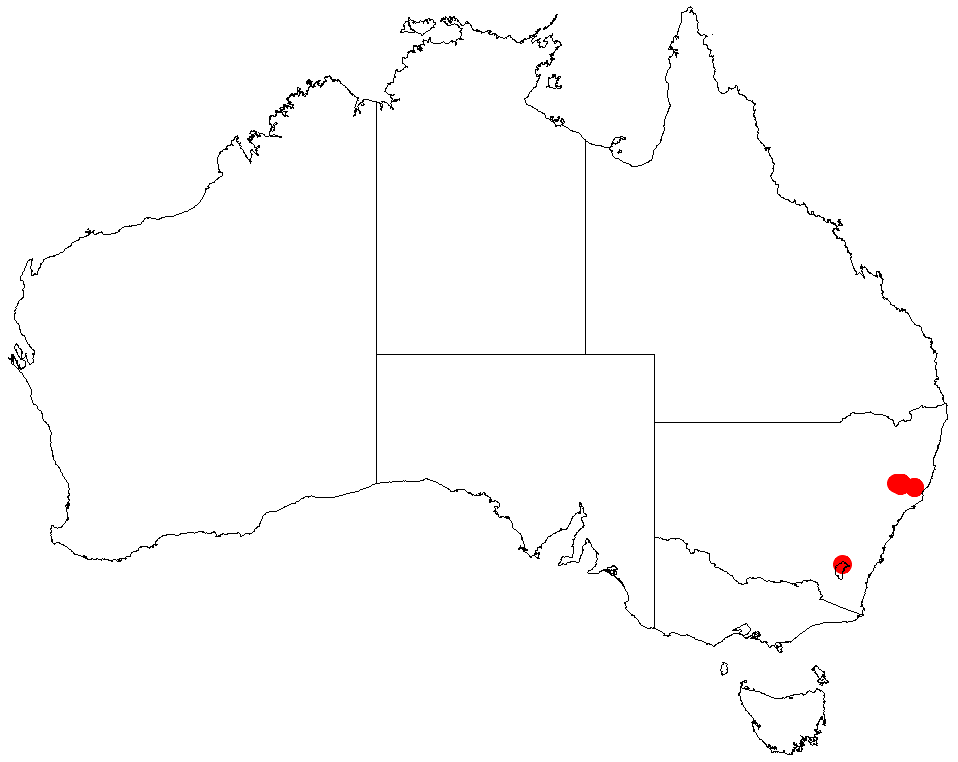
- Occurrence data from AVH

Species of legume

Acacia serpentinicola is a species of wattle native to northern New South Wales.

== Description ==
The shrub typically grows to a height of about 1.5 m (4 ft 11 in) and has a spreading habit. It has glabrous, terete dark greyish brown branchlets. Like most species of Acacia it has phyllodes rather than true leaves. The glabrous, pungent and subrigid phyllodes are flat and curved to straight with a linear to narrowly oblanceolate shape. The phyllodes are 5 to 10 cm (2.0 to 3.9 in) in length and 1.5 to 5 mm (0.059 to 0.197 in) wide and have a slightly impressed midvein. It mostly blooms between August and October.

== Taxonomy ==
It belongs to the Acacia juncifolia group and was once regarded as a subspecies of the much more widespread A. juncifolia.

== Distribution ==
It has a limited distribution in north eastern New South Wales where it found on serpentinite ridges between Mount George and Bralga Tops and upper areas of the Barnard River where it is situated in rugged parts of the Great Dividing Range.

== See also ==
- List of Acacia species
