= Pultenaea tenella =

Delicate bush-pea

Scientific classification
- Kingdom: Plantae
- Clade: Tracheophytes
- Clade: Angiosperms
- Clade: Eudicots
- Clade: Rosids
- Order: Fabales
- Family: Fabaceae
- Subfamily: Faboideae
- Genus: Pultenaea
- Species: P. tenella

Binomial name
- Pultenaea tenella Benth.

Species of flowering plant

Pultenaea tenella, commonly known as delicate bush-pea, is a species of flowering plant in the family Fabaceae and is endemic to the high country near the border between New South Wales and Victoria in south-eastern continental Australia. It is a small, prostrate, mat-forming shrub with elliptic to linear leaves and yellow to orange and red, pea-like flowers.

== Description ==
Pultenaea tenella is a trailing, prostrate, mat-forming shrub that typically grows to a height of 10–15 cm (3.9–5.9 in) and has trailing branchlets up to 40 cm (16 in) long that form adventitious roots at the nodes. The leaves are arranged in whorls of three, elliptic to linear, mostly 3.5–6.0 mm (0.14–0.24 in) long and 0.8–1.0 mm (0.031–0.039 in) wide with stipules 0.6–0.8 mm (0.024–0.031 in) long at the base. The upper surface of the leaves is glabrous but the lower surface is hairy. The flowers are borne singly in leaf axils on a pedicel 6–15 mm (0.24–0.59 in) long with linear bracteoles 1.7–2.0 mm (0.067–0.079 in) long attached. The sepals are 5.5–6.0 mm (0.22–0.24 in) long, the standard yellow to orange with a red base and 8.4–9.5 mm (0.33–0.37 in) long, the wings yellow to orange and 7.2–9.0 mm (0.28–0.35 in) long and the keel yellow and 7.0–7.2 mm (0.28–0.28 in) long. Flowering occurs from December to January and the fruit is a flattened pod 5.0–5.8 mm (0.20–0.23 in) long.

== Taxonomy and naming ==
Pultenaea tenella was first formally described in 1864 by George Bentham in Flora Australiensis from specimens collected by Ferdinand von Mueller at "an elevation of 5,000 ft (1,500 m)". The specific epithet (tenella) means "delicate".

== Distribution and habitat ==
This pultenaea grows in swamps and moist herbfields in the ranges of north-eastern Victoria, and there is a single record from Mount Kosciuszko in New South Wales.
