= P. pedunculata =

P. pedunculata may refer to:

- Petrophile pedunculata, conesticks, a flowering plant species
- Pultenaea pedunculata, the matted bush-pea, a flowering plant species
