= Jennata =

Jennata may refer to:

- Jannata, a town in Lebanon
- Jennata (plant), a genus of flowering plants
