= Pultenaea bracteaminor =

Scientific classification
- Kingdom: Plantae
- Clade: Tracheophytes
- Clade: Angiosperms
- Clade: Eudicots
- Clade: Rosids
- Order: Fabales
- Family: Fabaceae
- Subfamily: Faboideae
- Genus: Pultenaea
- Species: P. bracteaminor

Binomial name
- Pultenaea bracteaminor de Kok

Species of flowering plant

Pultenaea bracteaminor is a species of flowering plant in the family Fabaceae and is endemic to Queensland. It is an erect shrub with cylindrical leaves and yellow to orange and red flowers.

== Description ==
Pultenaea bracteaminor is an erect shrub that typically grows to a height of 10–30 cm (3.9–11.8 in) and has hairy branches. The leaves are round to u-shaped in cross-section, 5–11.5 mm (0.20–0.45 in) long and 0.7–0.8 mm (0.028–0.031 in) wide with stipules 3–4 mm (0.12–0.16 in) long at the base and with the edges rolled under. The flowers are arranged in crowded groups on the ends of branchlets, the sepals 5.0–5.5 mm (0.20–0.22 in) long with scale-like, three-pointed bracts and boat-shaped to linear bracteoles 2–4 mm (0.079–0.157 in) long. The standard petal is yellow to orange and 7.2–9 mm (0.28–0.35 in) long, the wings yellow to orange and 7–8 mm (0.28–0.31 in) long and the keel is red to purple. Flowering occurs from August to September and the fruit is an oval pod 3.5–5 mm (0.14–0.20 in) long.

== Taxonomy and naming ==
Pultenaea bracteaminor was first formally described in 2004 by Rogier Petrus Johannes de Kok in Australian Systematic Botany from specimens collected near Jandowae by Bob Coveny. The specific epithet (bracteaminor) refers to the bracts that are scale-like and much smaller than those of P. bracteamajor.

== Distribution and habitat ==
This pultenaea grows in woodland and forest in the Burnett and Darling Downs regions of south-eastern Queensland.
