= Grievea =

Scientific classification
- Kingdom: Plantae
- Clade: Tracheophytes
- Clade: Angiosperms
- Clade: Eudicots
- Clade: Rosids
- Order: Fabales
- Family: Fabaceae
- Subfamily: Faboideae
- Clade: Mirbelioids
- Genus: Grievea; R.L.Barrett, Clugston & Orthia

Genus of flowering plants

Grievea is a genus of flowering plants in the family Fabaceae. It includes two species native to Southwest Australia.

- Grievea brachytropis (Benth.) R.L.Barrett & Orthia
- Grievea craigiana (C.F.Wilkins, Orthia & Crisp) Orthia & R.L.Barrett

The species were formerly included in Pultenaea. Phylogenetic studies found Pultenaea to be paraphyletic relative to several other mirbelioid genera. Russell L. Barrett et al. analysed recent phylogenetic data on Pultenaea species and found five distinct lineages, which the authors recognised as distinct genera – Pultenaea sensu stricto, the reinstated Euchilus, and the newly described genera Grievea, Jennata, and Loricobbia.
