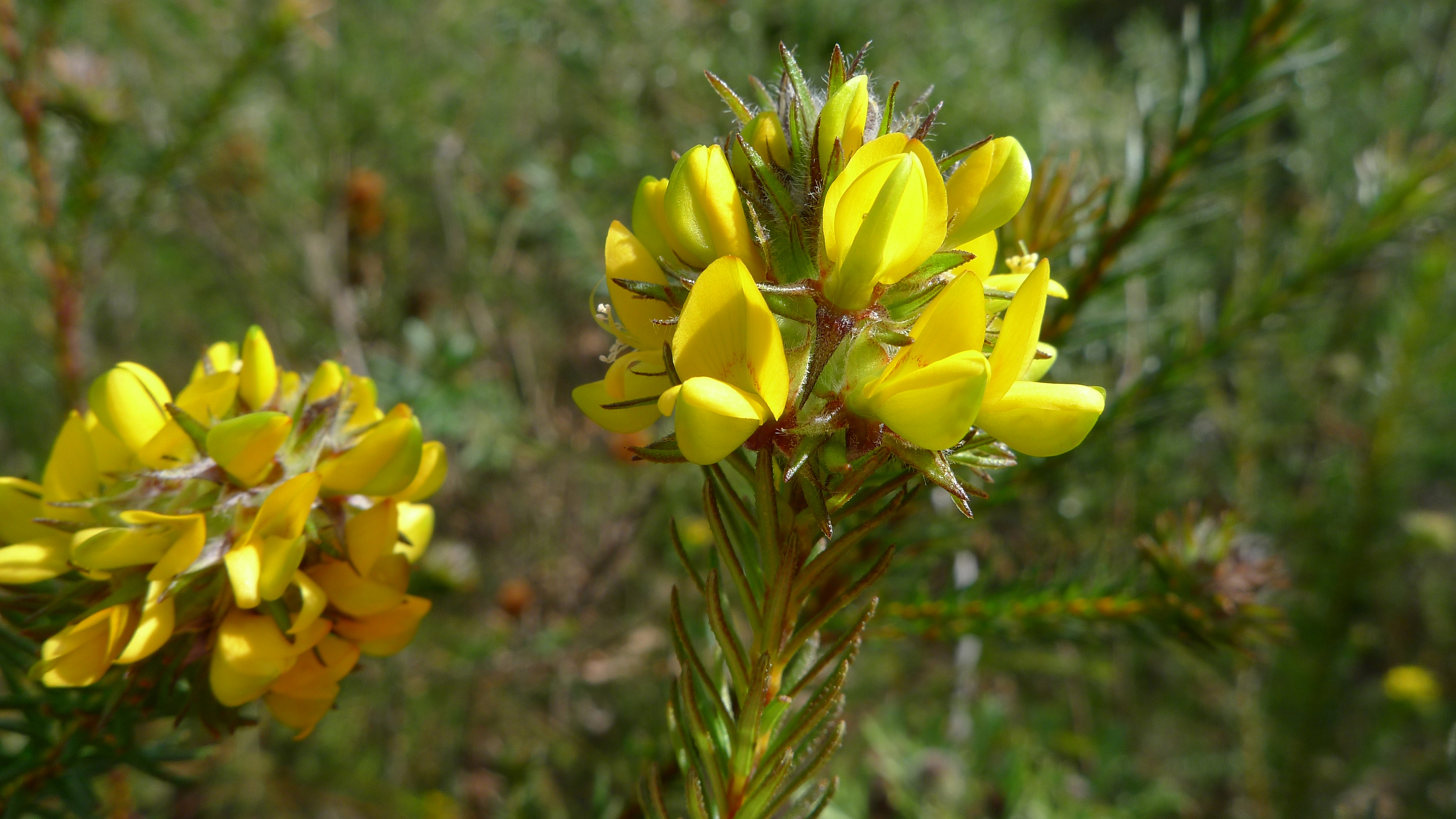

Scientific classification
- Kingdom: Plantae
- Clade: Tracheophytes
- Clade: Angiosperms
- Clade: Eudicots
- Clade: Rosids
- Order: Fabales
- Family: Fabaceae
- Subfamily: Faboideae
- Genus: Pultenaea
- Species: P. stipularis

Binomial name
- Pultenaea stipularis Sm.

Synonyms
- Pultenaea proteaeoides DC. nom. inval., pro syn.; Pultenaea psoraleoides Steud. nom. inval., nom. nud.

= Pultenaea stipularis =

Handsome bush-pea

Species of legume

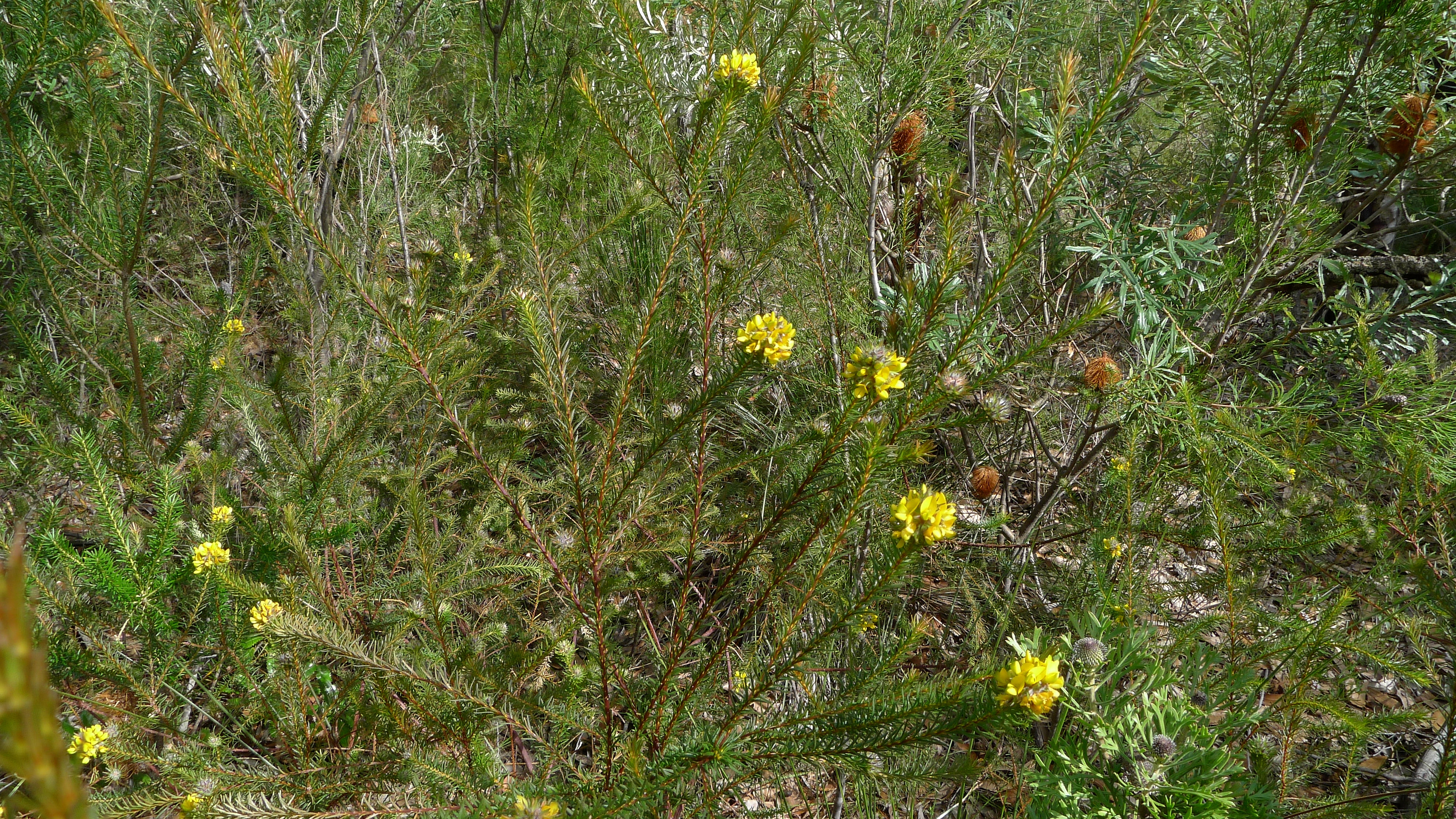
Habit in the Royal National Park

Pultenaea stipularis, commonly known as handsome bush-pea, is a species of flowering plant in the family Fabaceae and is endemic to New South Wales. It is an erect shrub with glabrous stems, linear to narrow elliptic leaves, and yellow to orange flowers, sometimes with red markings.

== Description ==
Pultenaea stipularis is an erect shrub that typically grow to a height of 0.8–2 m (2 ft 7 in – 6 ft 7 in) and has glabrous stems. The leaves are arranged alternately, linear to narrow elliptic, 15–26 mm (0.59–1.02 in) long and 1–2 mm (0.039–0.079 in) wide with stipules 7.8–9.3 mm (0.31–0.37 in) long at the base. The flowers are arranged in dense clusters at the ends of branches and are 10–15 mm (0.39–0.59 in) long, each flower on a pedicel 1–2 mm (0.039–0.079 in) long with overlapping bracts at the base. The sepals are 7.5–8.5 mm (0.30–0.33 in) long, joined at the base, and there are linear to triangular bracteoles 5.7–6.8 mm (0.22–0.27 in) long attached to the side of the sepal tube. The standard petal is yellow to orange with red markings and 8.5–12.5 mm (0.33–0.49 in) long, the wings are yellow to orange and 8.2–12.3 mm (0.32–0.48 in) long and the keel is yellow to reddish-brown and 8.0–11.2 mm (0.31–0.44 in) long. Flowering occurs from August to November and the fruit is a pod about 6.5 mm (0.26 in) long.

== Taxonomy ==
Pultenaea stipularis was first formally described in 1794 by James Edward Smith in A Specimen of the Botany of New Holland.

== Distribution and habitat ==
Handsome bush-pea grows in forest and tall heathland between Gosford on the Central Coast and Jervis Bay on the South Coast of New South Wales.
