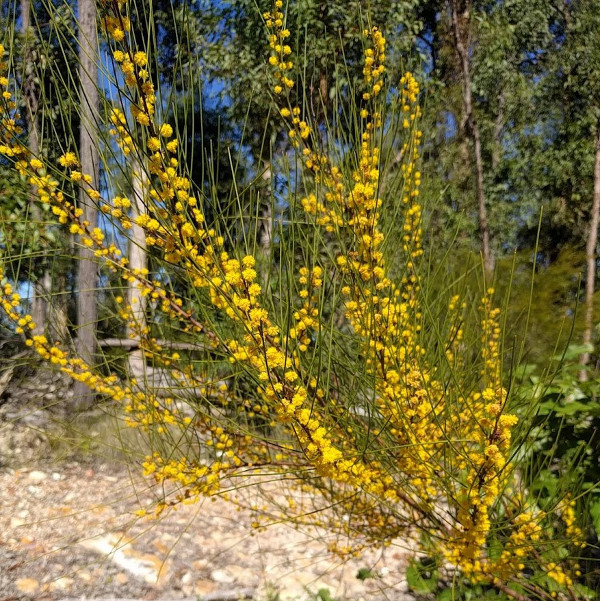
- North of Yengarie

Scientific classification
- Kingdom: Plantae
- Clade: Embryophytes
- Clade: Tracheophytes
- Clade: Spermatophytes
- Clade: Angiosperms
- Clade: Eudicots
- Clade: Rosids
- Order: Fabales
- Family: Fabaceae
- Subfamily: Caesalpinioideae
- Clade: Mimosoid clade
- Genus: Acacia
- Species: A. juncifolia

Binomial name
- Acacia juncifolia Benth.
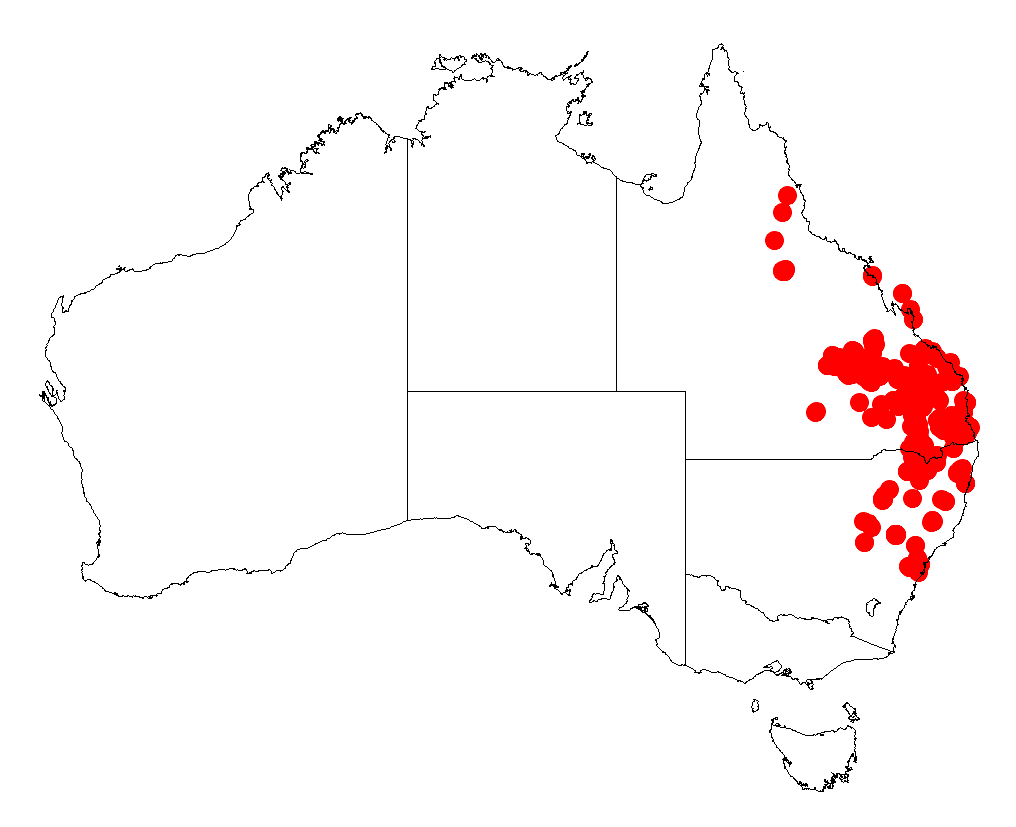
- Occurrence data from AVH

Synonyms
- Acacia juncifolia Benth. subsp. juncifolia; Acacia pinifolia Benth.; Racosperma juncifolium (Benth.) Pedley

= Acacia juncifolia =

Rush-leaf wattle

Species of legume

Acacia juncifolia, commonly known as rush-leaf wattle, is a species of flowering plant in the family Fabaceae and is endemic to eastern Australia. It is an erect or spreading, somewhat spindly shrub, with rigid, linear, thread-like phyllodes, spherical heads of pale yellow to deep buttercup flowers, and firmly papery to thinly leathery pods raised over the seeds.

== Description ==
Acacia juncifolia is an erect or spreading, somewhat spindly shrub that typically grows to a height of up to 3 m (9.8 ft) and has glabrous, slender, reddish-brown branchlets. Its phyllodes are ascending to erect and thread-like, straight to slightly curved, terete to four-sided in cross section, 70–120 mm (2.8–4.7 in) long and about 1 mm (0.039 in) wide. There is a gland 2–8 mm (0.079–0.315 in) above the pulvinus. The flowers are usually borne in one or two spherical heads in axils on glabrous peduncles 4–12 mm (0.16–0.47 in) long, each head with 20 to 30 pale yellow to deep buttercup yellow flowers. Flowering occurs from June to November, and the pods are up to 100 mm (3.9 in) long and 3–4 mm (0.12–0.16 in) wide, firmaly papery to thinly leathery, prominently raised over the seeds and slightly to moderately constricted between them. The seeds are oblong, 3.5–4.5 mm (0.14–0.18 in) long, mottled dull black and yellow without an aril.

== Taxonomy ==
Acacia juncifolia was first formally described in 1842 by George Bentham in Hooker's London Journal of Botany. The specific epithet (juncifolia) is taken from the Latin words juncus meaning 'rush' and folium meaning 'leaf' in reference to the rush-like appearance of the phyllodes. A. juncifolia has a similar appearance to Acacia calamifolia.

== Distribution and habitat ==
Rush-leaf wattle grows in shallow sand derived from sandstone, sometimes granite, in forest or woodland from near Port Clinton in Queensland to near Glenbrook in New South Wales, and inland for a maximum of 550 km (340 mi) inland.

== Conservation status ==
Acacia juncifolia is listed as 'least concern' under the Queensland Government Nature Conservation Act 1992.

== See also ==
- List of Acacia species
