= Brenanah =

- Town
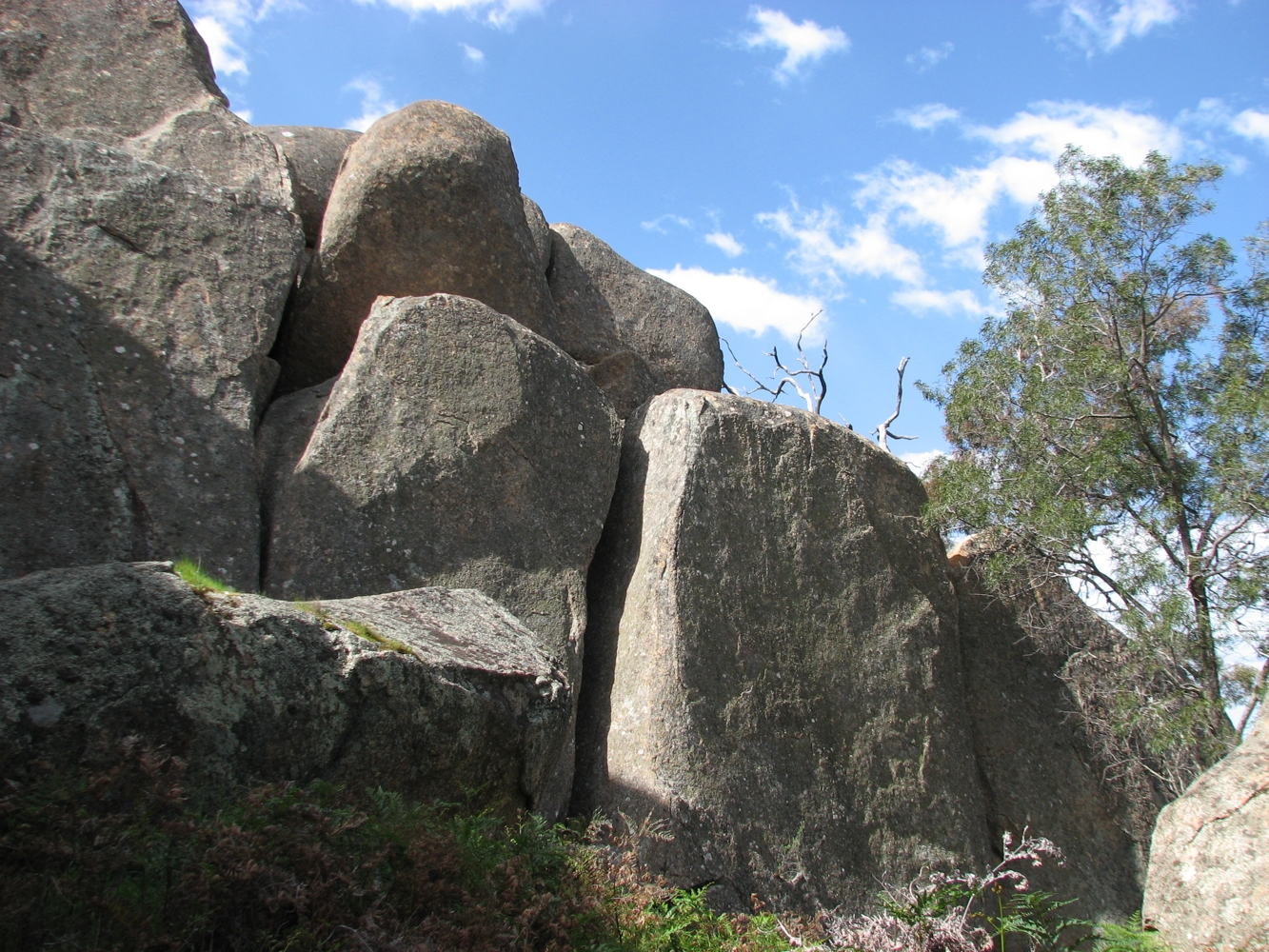
- Melville Caves in Kooyoora State Park

- Coordinates: 36°33′34″S 143°42′21″E
- Country: Australia
- State: Victoria
- LGA: Shire of Loddon

Government
  - State electorate: Ripon
  - Federal division: Mallee

Population
  - Total: 29 (2021 census)
- Postcode: 3517

Brenanah is a locality in the Shire of Loddon, Victoria, Australia. At the 2021 census, Brenanah had a population of 29.

Kooyoora State Park is located in Brenanah.
