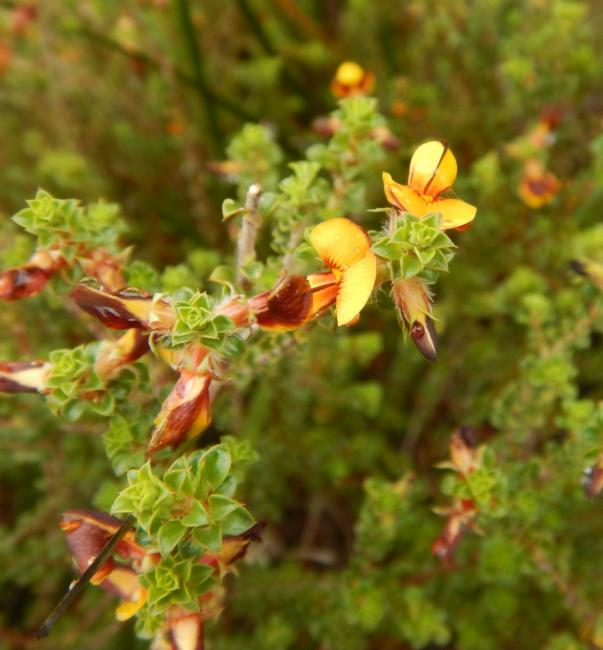
- Pultenaea densifolia near Tintinara

Scientific classification
- Kingdom: Plantae
- Clade: Tracheophytes
- Clade: Angiosperms
- Clade: Eudicots
- Clade: Rosids
- Order: Fabales
- Family: Fabaceae
- Subfamily: Faboideae
- Genus: Pultenaea
- Species: P. densifolia

Binomial name
- Pultenaea densifolia F.Muell.

= Pultenaea densifolia =

Dense-leaved bush-pea

Species of legume

Pultenaea densifolia, commonly known as dense-leaved bush-pea, is a species of flowering plant in the family Fabaceae and is endemic to southern continental Australia. It is a spreading or low-lying shrub with broadly egg-shaped, down-curved leaves and clusters of purple or yellow, red and purple flowers.

== Description ==
Pultenaea densifolia is a spreading, low-lying or prostrate shrub that typically grows to a height of 50 cm (20 in) and has hairy stems often partly hidden by stipules. The leaves are broadly egg-shaped, down-curved, 2–3 mm (0.079–0.118 in) long, 1–2 mm (0.039–0.079 in) wide and glabrous with papery stipules about 2 mm (0.079 in) long at the base. The flowers are clustered in leaf axils near the ends of branches with stipules at the base, the sepals 4–7 mm (0.16–0.28 in) long with lance-shaped bracteoles 3–6 mm (0.12–0.24 in) long attached to the sepal tube. The standard is purple or yellow with red markings, and the wings and keel are purple. Flowering occurs from October to November and the fruit is an egg-shaped pod mostly enclosed by the remains of the sepals.

== Taxonomy and naming ==
Pultenaea densifolia was first formally described in 1855 by Ferdinand von Mueller in Definitions of rare or hitherto undescribed Australian plants. The specific epithet (densifolia) means "crowded-leaved".

== Distribution and habitat ==
This pultenaea grows in mallee in south-eastern South Australia and in north-western Victoria where it is uncommon.
