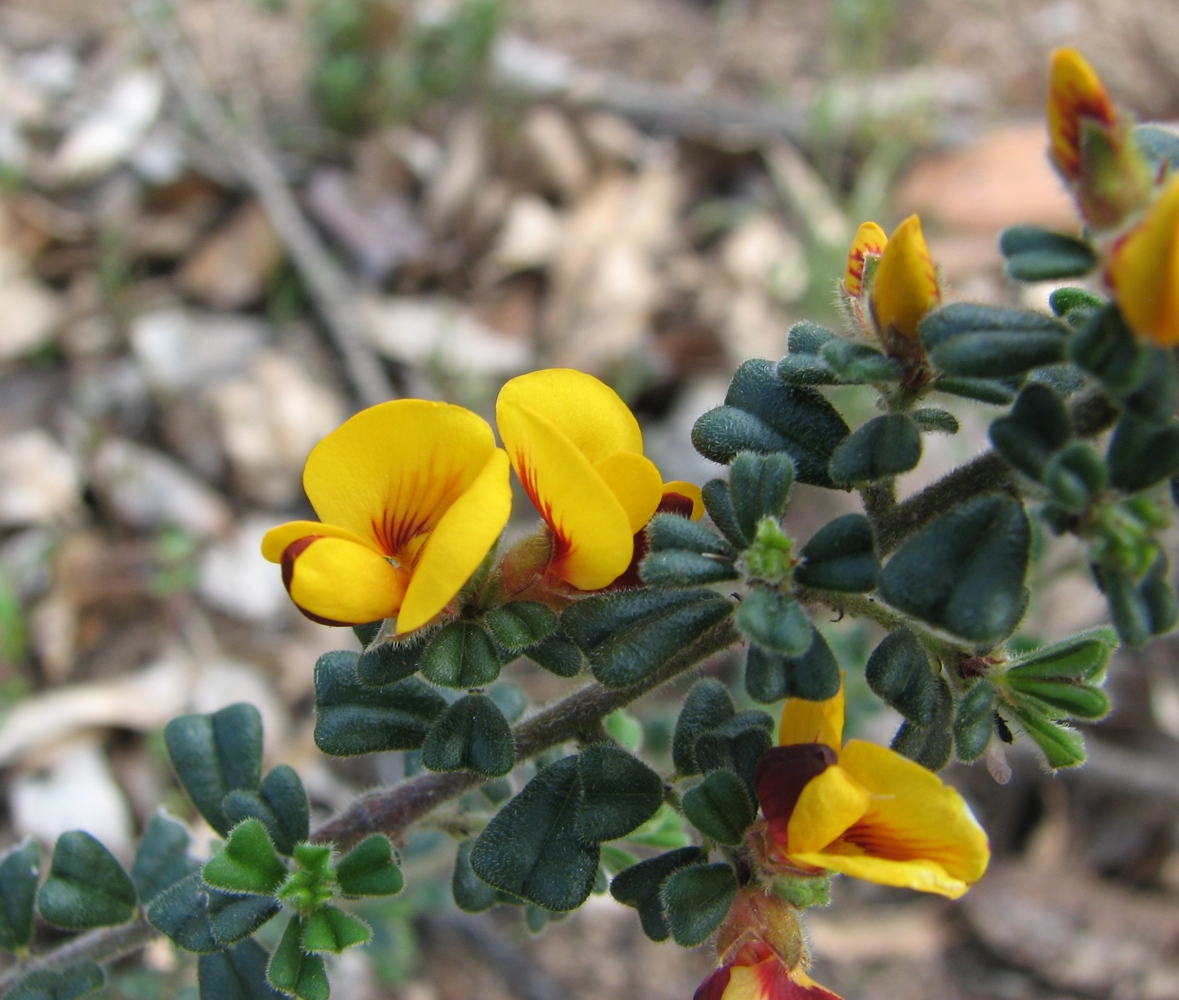

Scientific classification
- Kingdom: Plantae
- Clade: Tracheophytes
- Clade: Angiosperms
- Clade: Eudicots
- Clade: Rosids
- Order: Fabales
- Family: Fabaceae
- Subfamily: Faboideae
- Genus: Pultenaea
- Species: P. scabra

Binomial name
- Pultenaea scabra R.Br.

Synonyms
- Pultenaea biloba R.Br. & Sims; Pultenaea biloba R.Br. & Sims var. biloba; Pultenaea biloba var. scabra Sieber ex DC.; Pultenaea deltoidea DC. nom. inval., pro syn.; Pultenaea montana Lindl.; Pultenaea scabra var. biloba (R.Br.) Benth.; Pultenaea scabra var. microphylla R.T.Baker; Pultenaea scabra var. montana (Lindl.) Benth.; Pultenaea scabra R.Br. var. scabra

= Pultenaea scabra =

Rough bush-pea

Species of plant

Pultenaea scabra, commonly known as rough bush-pea, is a species of flowering plant in the family Fabaceae and is endemic to south-eastern continental Australia. It is an erect or spreading shrub with hairy stems, heart-shaped leaves with the narrower end towards the base, and yellow and red, pea-like flowers.

== Description ==
Pultenaea scabra is an erect or spreading shrub that typically grows to a height of 1–3 m (3 ft 3 in – 9 ft 10 in) and has densely hairy stems. The leaves are arranged alternately, wedge-shaped to heart-shaped with the narrower end towards the base, 3–16 mm (0.12–0.63 in) long, 2–13 mm (0.079–0.512 in) wide with triangular to lance-shaped stipules 1–4 mm (0.039–0.157 in) long at the base. The edges of the leaves curve down or are rolled under and there is a small point on the end. The flowers are arranged in usually dense clusters of more than three, each flower on a pedicel 0.5–1 mm (0.020–0.039 in) long with more or less round bracts 1–3 mm (0.039–0.118 in) long at the base and hairy bracteoles 3–5 mm (0.12–0.20 in) long attached at the base of the sepal tube. The sepals are 4–6 mm (0.16–0.24 in) long, the standard petal is yellow with a red base and 7–12 mm (0.28–0.47 in) long, the wings are yellow and red and shorter than the standard, and the keel is dark red to crimson, and about the same length as the wings. Flowering occurs from September to November and the fruit is a flattened, egg-shaped pod 5–7 mm (0.20–0.28 in) long.

== Taxonomy ==
Pultenaea scabra was first formally described in 1811 by Robert Brown in Hortus Kewensis. The specific epithet (scabra) means "rough".

== Distribution and habitat ==
Rough bush-pea grows in heathland and forest south of Rylstone in New South Wales, in southern Victoria, mainly south and east of the Great Dividing Range, and in the far south-east of South Australia.
