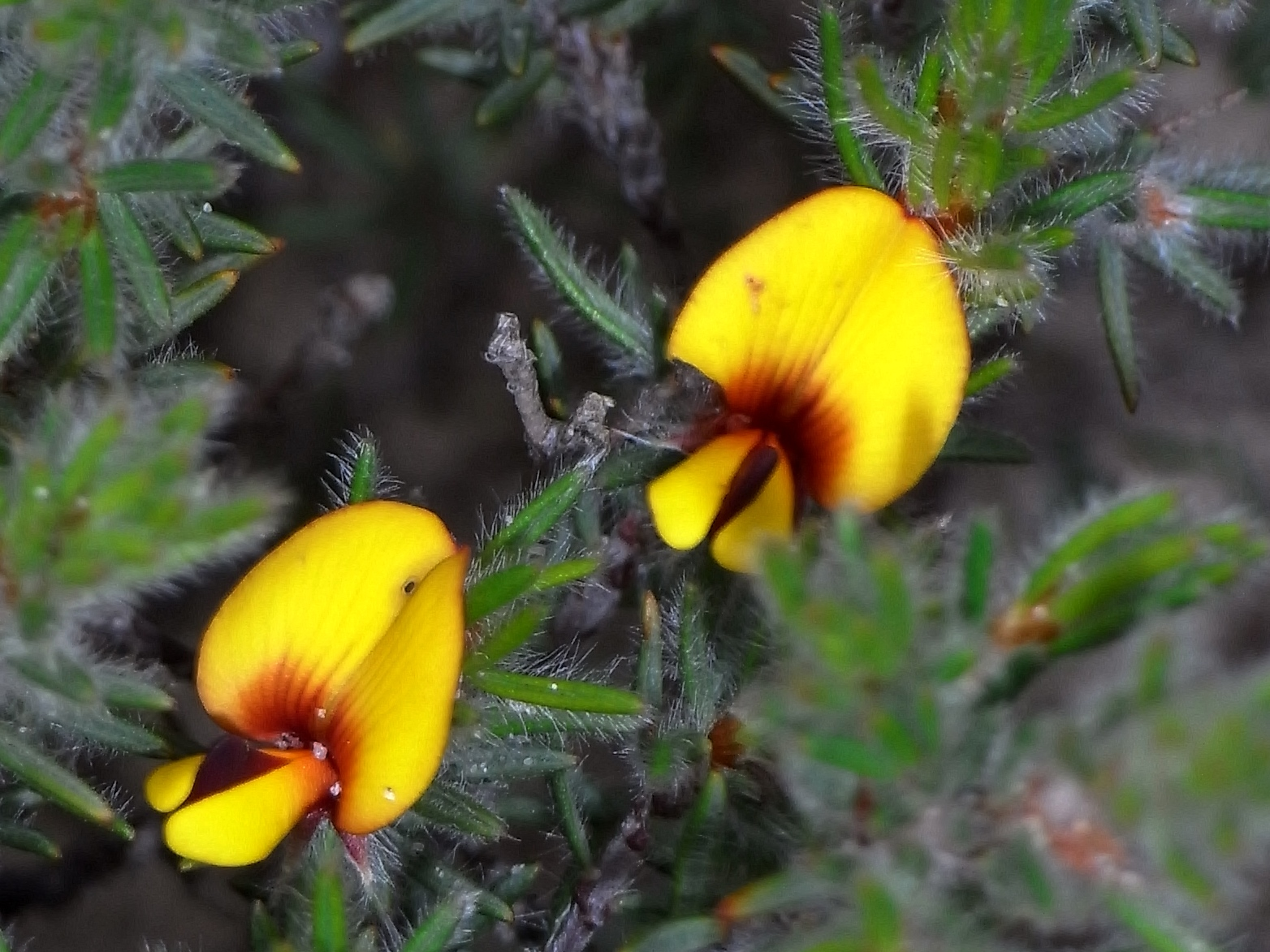
- Pultenaea tenuifolia in western Victoria

Scientific classification
- Kingdom: Plantae
- Clade: Tracheophytes
- Clade: Angiosperms
- Clade: Eudicots
- Clade: Rosids
- Order: Fabales
- Family: Fabaceae
- Subfamily: Faboideae
- Genus: Pultenaea
- Species: P. tenuifolia

Binomial name
- Pultenaea tenuifolia R.Br. ex Sims

Synonyms
- List: ? Pultenaea mollis var. canescens Benth.; Pultenaea tenuifolia var. glabra Benth.; Pultenaea teretifolia H.B.Will.; Pultenaea teretifolia var. brachyphylla H.B.Will.; Pultenaea teretifolia H.B.Will. var. teretifolia

= Pultenaea tenuifolia =

Slender bush-pea

Species of plant

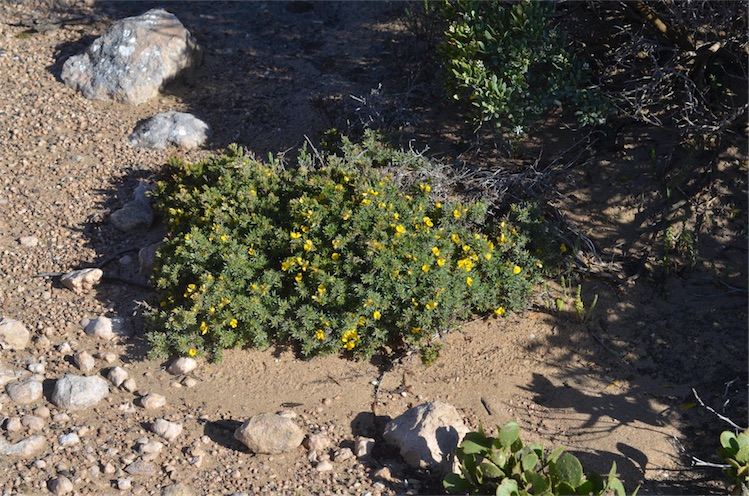
Habit at Anxious Bay

Pultenaea tenuifolia, commonly known as slender bush-pea, is a species of flowering plant in the family Fabaceae and is endemic to southern Australia. It is a spreading or low-lying to prostrate and mat-forming shrub with hairy branches, narrow lance-shaped leaves, and yellow to orange and red, pea-like flowers.

== Description ==
Pultenaea tenuifolia is a spreading or low-lying to prostrate and mat-forming shrub that typically grows to a height of up to 1 m (3 ft 3 in) with hairy branches up to 1 m (3 ft 3 in) long. The leaves are narrow lance-shaped, mostly 4–8 mm (0.16–0.31 in) long and 0.3–0.5 mm (0.012–0.020 in) wide with stipules 2–3 mm (0.079–0.118 in) long at the base. The leaves are channelled on the upper surface and often clustered. The flowers are 5–8 mm (0.20–0.31 in) long, sessile and arranged singly or in pairs at the ends of short side-branches surrounded by clustered leaves. The sepals are 4–5 mm (0.16–0.20 in) long and joined at the base with hairy egg-shaped to oblong lobes and bracteoles about 3 mm (0.12 in) long at the base. The petals are yellow to orange and red, the standard petal 4.5–8 mm (0.18–0.31 in) wide, the wings oblong to egg-shaped and 4.0–6.7 mm (0.16–0.26 in) long and the keel semi-circular and 4–6 mm (0.16–0.24 in) long. Flowering occurs from August to December and the fruit is a hairy, egg-shaped pod.

== Taxonomy ==
Pultenaea tenuifolia was first formally described in 1819 by John Sims in Curtis's Botanical Magazine from an unpublished description by Robert Brown of a specimen cultivated in England. The specific epithet (tenuifolia) means "thin-leaved".

== Distribution and habitat ==
Slender bush-pea is found in Western Australia, South Australia, Victoria and Tasmania. In Western Australia it grows in near-coastal areas in the Esperance Plains, Jarrah Forest and Warren biogeographic regions and in South Australia from the Eyre Peninsula to the Victorian border. In Victoria it occurs on coastal sand dunes and on the calcareous soils of the Little and Big Deserts. The species is found on granite in north-eastern Tasmania.
