= Jennata (plant) =

Scientific classification
- Kingdom: Plantae
- Clade: Tracheophytes
- Clade: Angiosperms
- Clade: Eudicots
- Clade: Rosids
- Order: Fabales
- Family: Fabaceae
- Subfamily: Faboideae
- Clade: Mirbelioids
- Genus: Jennata; R.L.Barrett, Clugston & Orthia

Genus of flowering plants

Jennata is a genus of flowering plants in the family Fabaceae. It includes seven species native to Southwest Australia.

== Species ==
Seven species are accepted.

- Jennata brachyphylla (Turcz.) R.L.Barrett & Clugston
- Jennata empetrifolia (Meisn.) R.L.Barrett & Clugston
- Jennata ericifolia (Benth. ex Lindl.) R.L.Barrett & Clugston
- Jennata indira (Orthia & Crisp) Orthia & R.L.Barrett
- Jennata radiata (H.B.Will.) R.L.Barrett & Clugston
- Jennata strobilifera (Meisn.) R.L.Barrett & Clugston
- Jennata verruculosa (Turcz.) R.L.Barrett & Clugston

== Taxonomy ==
The species were formerly included in Pultenaea. Phylogenetic studies found Pultenaea to be paraphyletic relative to several other mirbelioid genera. Russell L. Barrett et al. analysed recent phylogenetic data on Pultenaea species and found five distinct lineages, which the authors recognised as distinct genera – Pultenaea sensu stricto, the reinstated Euchilus, and the newly described genera Grievea, Jennata, and Loricobbia.
