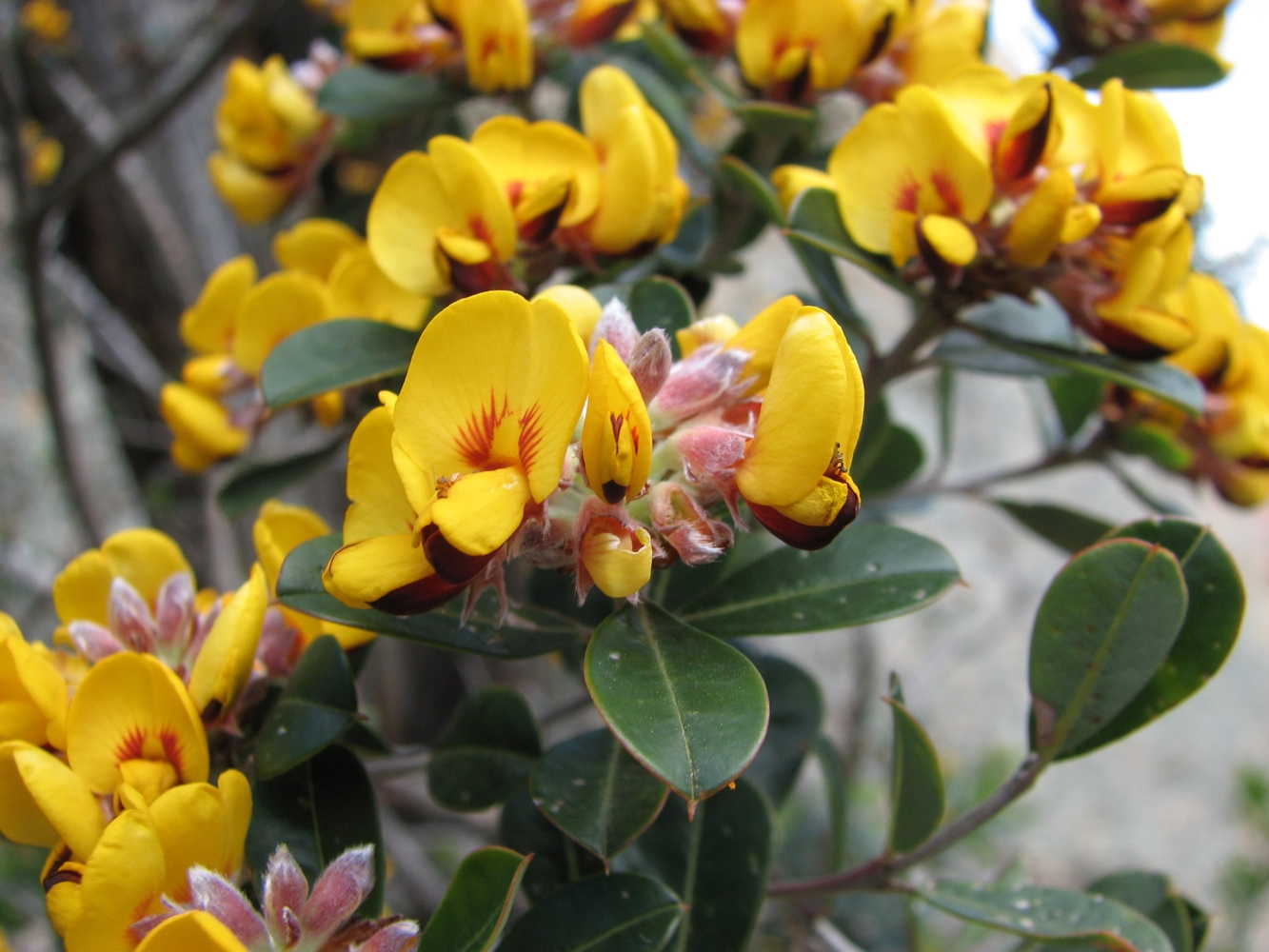
- Pultenaea daphnoides at Kooyoora State Park, Victoria

Scientific classification
- Kingdom: Plantae
- Clade: Tracheophytes
- Clade: Angiosperms
- Clade: Eudicots
- Clade: Rosids
- Order: Fabales
- Family: Fabaceae
- Subfamily: Faboideae
- Genus: Pultenaea
- Species: P. daphnoides

Binomial name
- Pultenaea daphnoides J.C.Wendl.

Synonyms
- Pultenaea daphnoides J.C.Wendl. var. daphnoides; Pultenaea daphnoides var. obcordata (Andrews) Hook.f.; Pultenaea obcordata Andrews

= Pultenaea daphnoides =

Large-leaf bush-pea

Species of plant

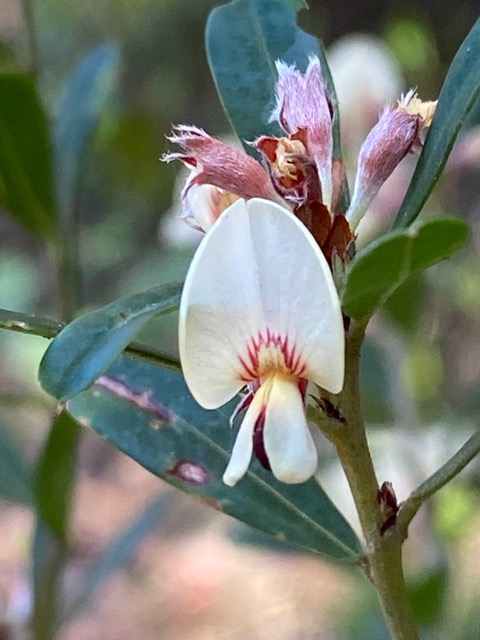
White form

Pultenaea daphnoides, commonly known as large-leaf bush-pea or large-leaf bitter-pea, is a species of flowering plant in the family Fabaceae and is endemic to south-eastern Australia. It is an erect shrub with egg-shaped to wedge-shaped leaves with a pointed tip, and dense clusters of bright yellow and red flowers.

== Description ==
Pultenaea daphnoides is an erect shrub that typically grows to a height of 1–3 m (3 ft 3 in – 9 ft 10 in) and has hairy, four-angled stems. The leaves are wedge-shaped to egg-shaped with the narrower end towards the base, 5–40 mm (0.20–1.57 in) long and 2–11 mm (0.079–0.433 in) wide with a pointed tip and stipules 1–2 mm (0.039–0.079 in) long at the base. The flowers are sessile, 7–15 mm (0.28–0.59 in) long and arranged in dense clusters of five to eleven on the ends of branches, with overlapping bracts at the base. The sepals are 4–6 mm (0.16–0.24 in) long with linear bracteoles 2–4 mm (0.079–0.157 in) long attached to the sepal tube. The standard and wings are bright yellow, the standard 9–12 mm (0.35–0.47 in) wide, the keel is scarlet and the ovary is covered with silky hairs. Flowering occurs from September to November and the fruit is an egg-shaped pod 5–7 mm (0.20–0.28 in) long.

== Taxonomy and naming ==
Pultenaea daphnoides was first formally described in 1798 by German botanist Johann Christoph Wendland in 1798 in his book, Botanische Beobachtungen. The specific epithet (daphnoides) means "Daphne-like".

== Distribution and habitat ==
This pultenaea grows in heath and forest from south-east Queensland, along the coast and tablelands of New South Wales, to Victoria where it is widespread and common except in the north-east of that state and Tasmania where it is also widespread and common. It also occurs in the south-east of South Australia, including on Kangaroo Island.

== Use in horticulture ==
Large-leaf bush-pea is a hardy, ornamental shrub and is useful as a feature plant or in an informal hedge, but should not be planted within 2 m (6 ft 7 in) of a sewer main.
