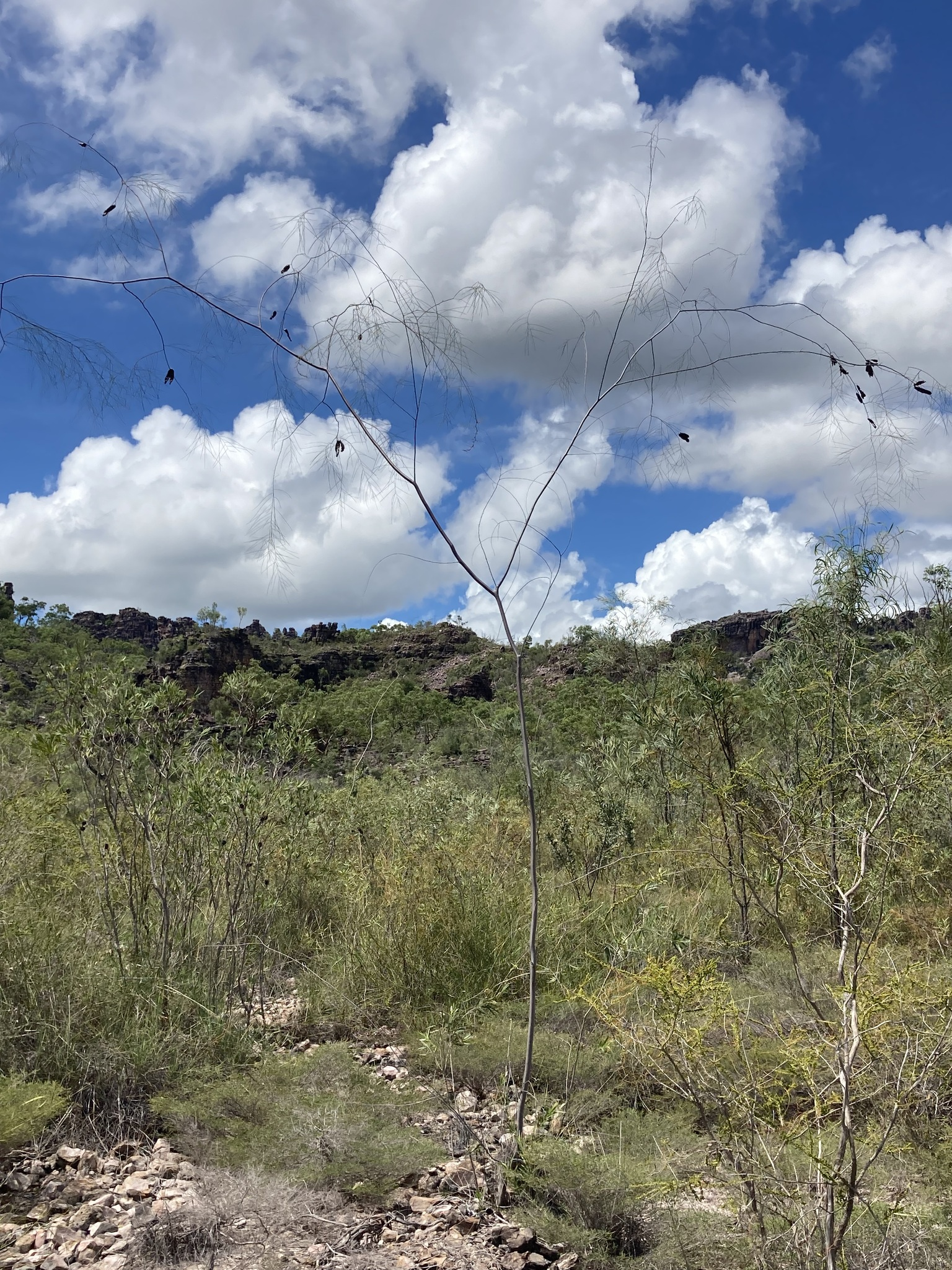

Conservation status
- Priority Three — Poorly Known Taxa (DEC)

Scientific classification
- Kingdom: Plantae
- Clade: Embryophytes
- Clade: Tracheophytes
- Clade: Spermatophytes
- Clade: Angiosperms
- Clade: Eudicots
- Clade: Rosids
- Order: Fabales
- Family: Fabaceae
- Subfamily: Caesalpinioideae
- Clade: Mimosoid clade
- Genus: Acacia
- Subgenus: Acacia subg. Phyllodineae
- Species: A. jasperensis

Binomial name
- Acacia jasperensis Maconochie
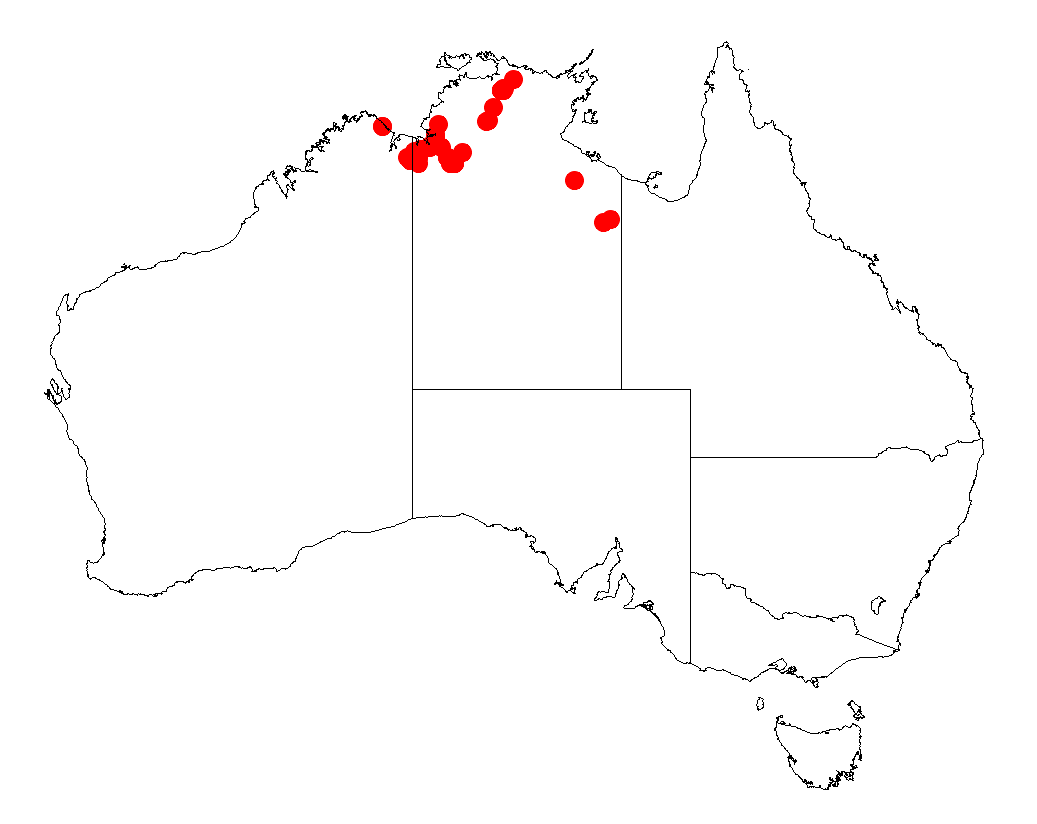
- Occurrence data from AVH

Synonyms
- Racosperma jasperense (Maconochie) Pedley

= Acacia jasperensis =

Species of legume

Acacia jasperensis is a species of flowering plant in the family Fabaceae and is endemic to the north of Australia. It is an erect, slender shrub or tree with erect, thread-like phyllodes, spherical heads of yellow flowers and flat, papery pods rounded over the seeds.

== Description ==
Acacia jasperensis is an erect, slender shrub or tree that typically grows to a height of up to 6 m (20 ft) and has smooth grey bark. Its phyllodes are erect, thread-like, 85–150 mm (3.3–5.9 in) long and 0.5–0.7 mm (0.020–0.028 in) long with a raised circular gland surrounded by a dark ring 5–6 mm (0.20–0.24 in) above the base of the phyllode. The flowers are yellow and borne in spherical heads in axils on glabrous peduncles 8–10 mm (0.31–0.39 in) long. The pods are papery, narrowly oblong, up to 100 mm (3.9 in) long, 8–18 mm (0.31–0.71 in) wide, rounded over the seeds, and covered in a white powdery coating. The seeds are more or less round to widely elliptic, 3.0–4.5 mm (0.12–0.18 in) wide and slightly shiny.

== Taxonomy ==
Acacia jasperensis was first formally described in 1982 by the botanist John Richard Maconochie in the Journal of the Adelaide Botanic Gardens from specimens collected by Alex George in Jasper Gorge in the Keep River National Park in 1981.The specific epithet (jasperensis) mean 'native of Jasper Gorge'.

== Distribution and habitat ==
This species of wattle grows on sandstone hills from the Keep River National Park and the Mount Brockman area in Kakadu National Park in the Northern Territory to just east of Kununurra in Western Australia.

== Conservation status ==
Acacia jasperensis is listed as 'least concern' under the Northern Territory Parks and Wildlife Conservation Act, but as 'Priority Three' by the Government of Western Australia Department of Biodiversity, Conservation and Attractions meaning that it is poorly known and known from only a few locations but is not under imminent threat.

== See also ==
- List of Acacia species
