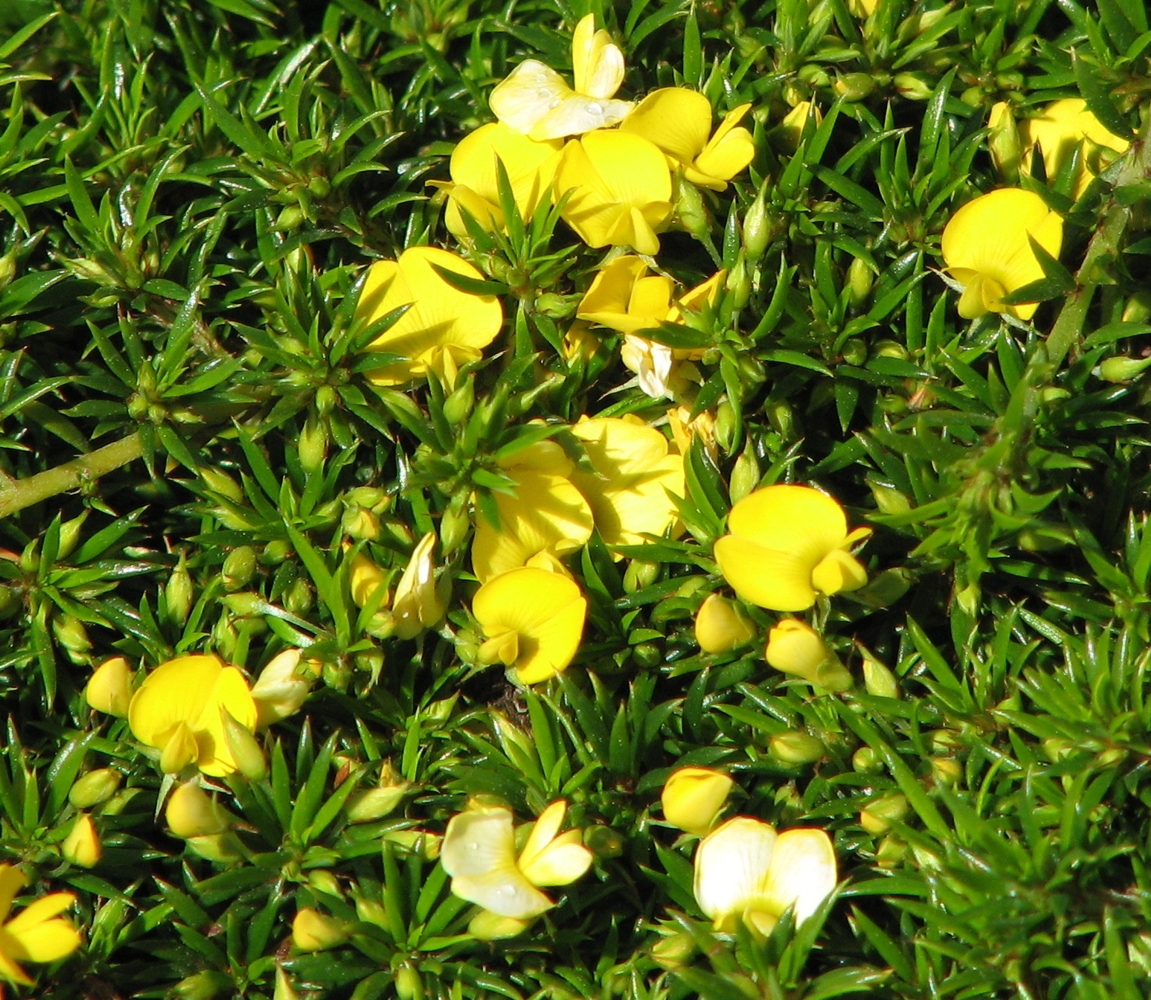

Scientific classification
- Kingdom: Plantae
- Clade: Tracheophytes
- Clade: Angiosperms
- Clade: Eudicots
- Clade: Rosids
- Order: Fabales
- Family: Fabaceae
- Subfamily: Faboideae
- Genus: Pultenaea
- Species: P. pedunculata

Binomial name
- Pultenaea pedunculata Hook.

Synonyms
- Pultenaea ausfeldi Regel orth. var.; Pultenaea ausfeldii Regel; Pultenaea ausfeldii Regel isonym; Pultenaea diemenica Turcz.; Pultenaea pedunculata var. latifolia H.B.Will.; Pultenaea pedunculata Hook. var. pedunculata; Pultenaea pedunculata var. pilosa H.B.Will.

= Pultenaea pedunculata =

Matted bush-pea

Species of plant

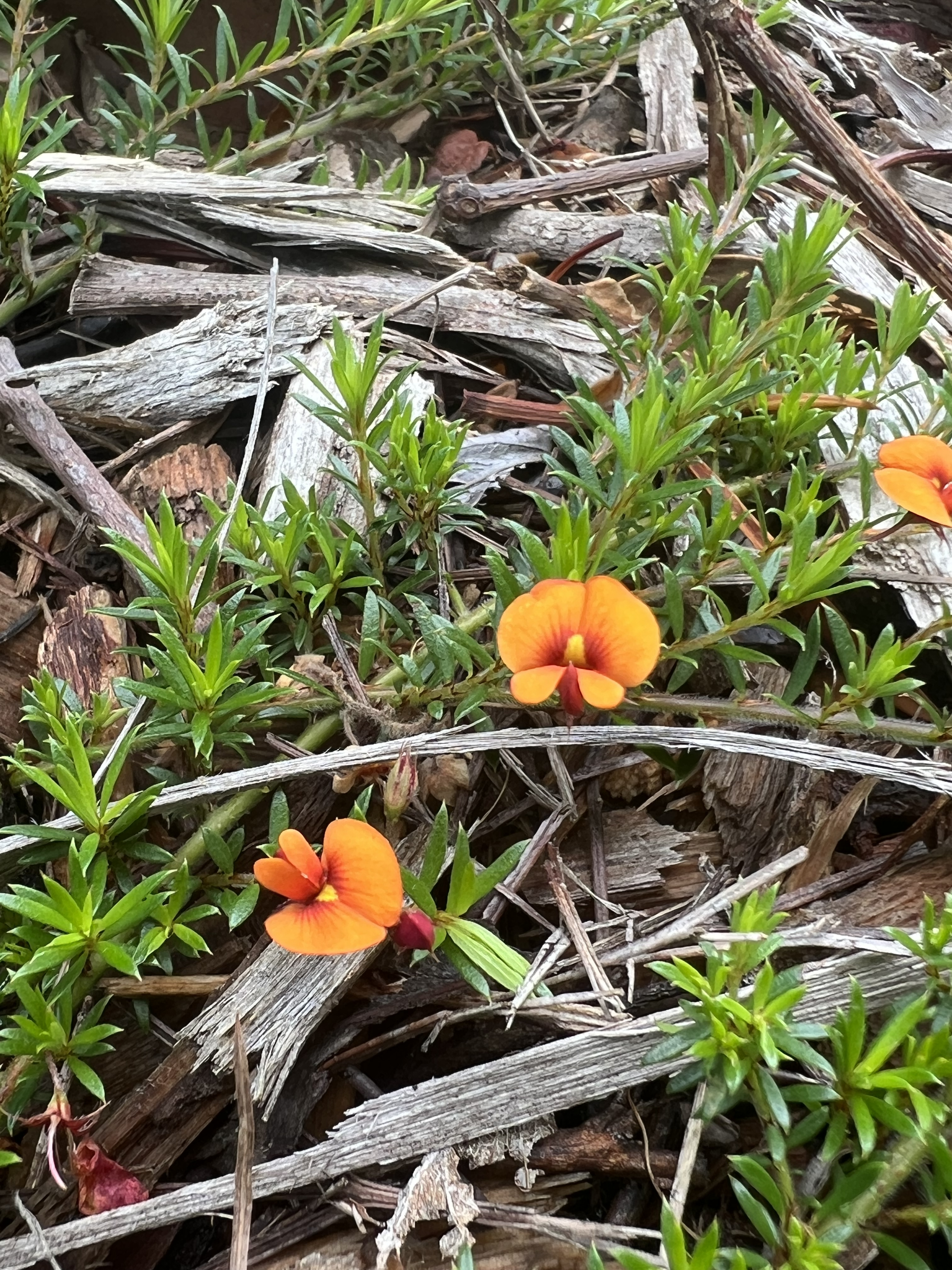
Orange form

Pultenaea pedunculata, commonly known as matted bush-pea, is a species of flowering plant in the family Fabaceae and is endemic to south-eastern Australia. It is a prostrate, densely matted shrub with softly-hairy branches that often form roots, narrow elliptic leaves, and bright yellow and brick-red flowers.

== Description ==
Pultenaea peduncluata is a prostrate, densely-matted shrub that forms carpets of 1 m (3 ft 3 in) or more in diameter, and has softy-hairy branches. The branches are up to several metres long but rarely more than 20 cm (7.9 in) off the ground, and often from roots to it. The leaves are arranged alternately, narrow elliptic, 6–11 mm (0.24–0.43 in) long, 1–2 mm (0.039–0.079 in) wide and sparsely hairy with stipules 2–3 mm (0.079–0.118 in) long at the base. The flowers are usually arranged singly in leaf axils near the ends of branches. They are 4–9 mm (0.16–0.35 in) long on a peduncle up to 30 mm (1.2 in) long with narrow lance-shaped bracteoles 2–4 mm (0.079–0.157 in) long attached near the base of the sepal tube. The sepals are 4–5 mm (0.16–0.20 in) long, the standard petal bright yellow, sometimes with a brick-red base, the wings yellow to orange and the keel red to purple, although the colour of the flowers is very variable. Flowering occurs in most months but mainly from September to December and the fruit is a spherical to egg-shaped pod 4–7 mm (0.16–0.28 in) long.

== Taxonomy ==
Pultenaea pedunculata was formally described in 1828 by English botanist William Jackson Hooker in the Botanical Magazine from specimens grown from seed collected by Charles Fraser. The specific epithet (pedunculata) means "pedunculate".

== Distribution and habitat ==
Matted bush-pea grows in forest, woodland, heathland and grassland from near Sydney in New South Wales through Victoria and south-eastern South Australia, to Tasmania where it is common and widespread in dry, rocky places.

== Conservation status ==
This species of pea is relatively common in Victoria, South Australia and Tasmania but is listed as "endangered" in New South Wales under the New South Wales Government Biodiversity Conservation Act. It is only known from three disjunct populations in that state.
