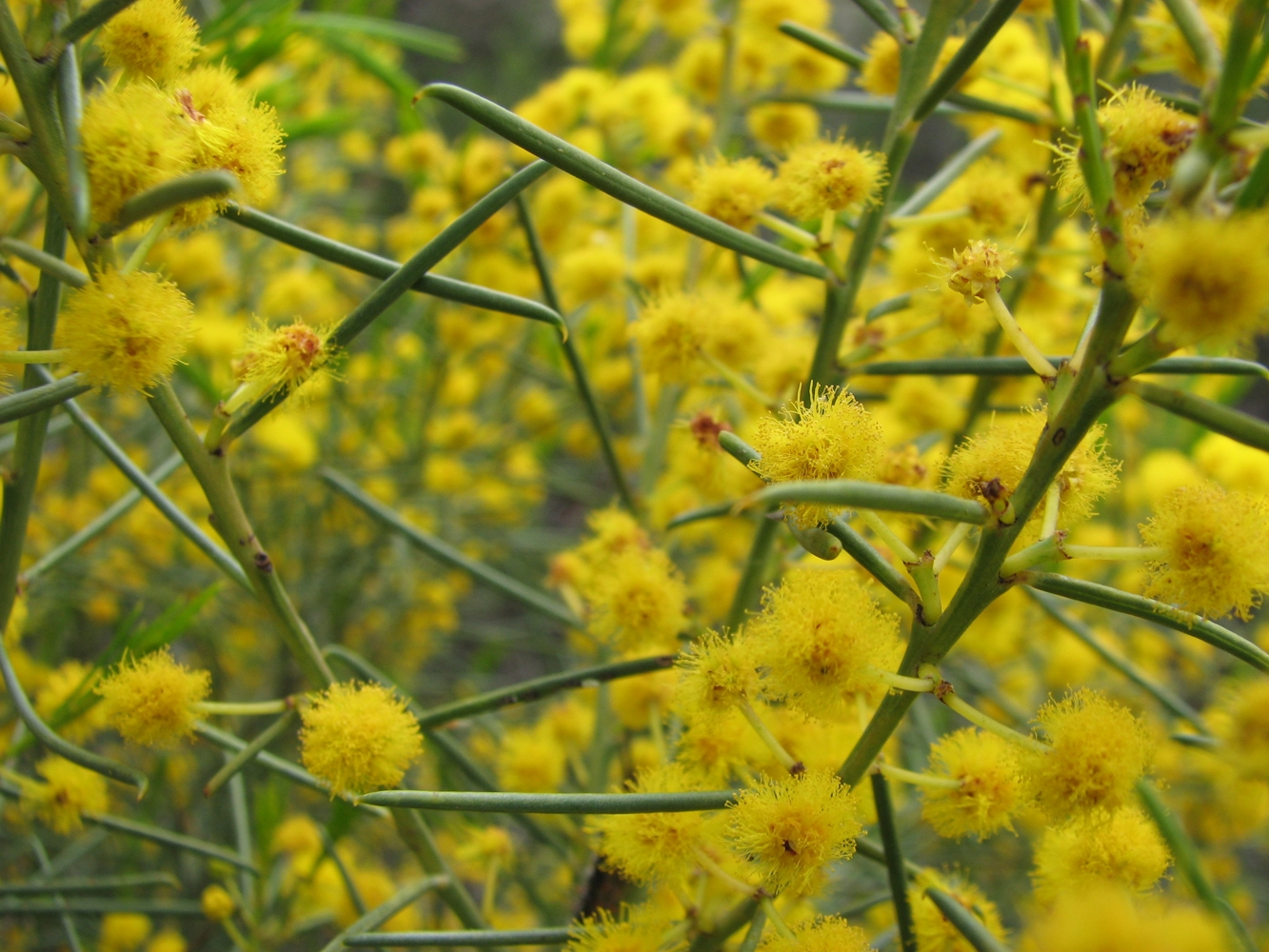
- Subsp. euthycarpa in Kooyoora State Park, Victoria

Scientific classification
- Kingdom: Plantae
- Clade: Tracheophytes
- Clade: Angiosperms
- Clade: Eudicots
- Clade: Rosids
- Order: Fabales
- Family: Fabaceae
- Subfamily: Caesalpinioideae
- Clade: Mimosoid clade
- Genus: Acacia
- Species: A. euthycarpa

Binomial name
- Acacia euthycarpa (J.M.Black) J.M.Black
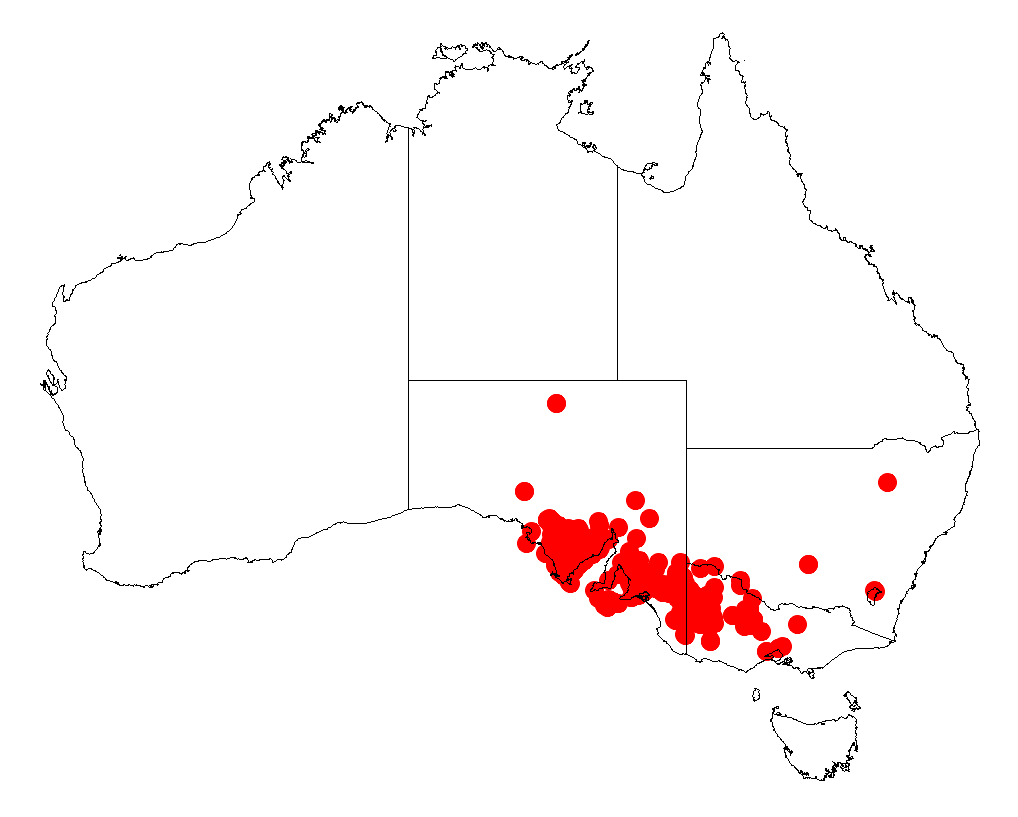
- Occurrence data from AVH

Synonyms
- Acacia calamifolia var. euthycarpa J.M.Black; Racosperma euthycarpum (J.M.Black) Pedley

= Acacia euthycarpa =

Species of plant

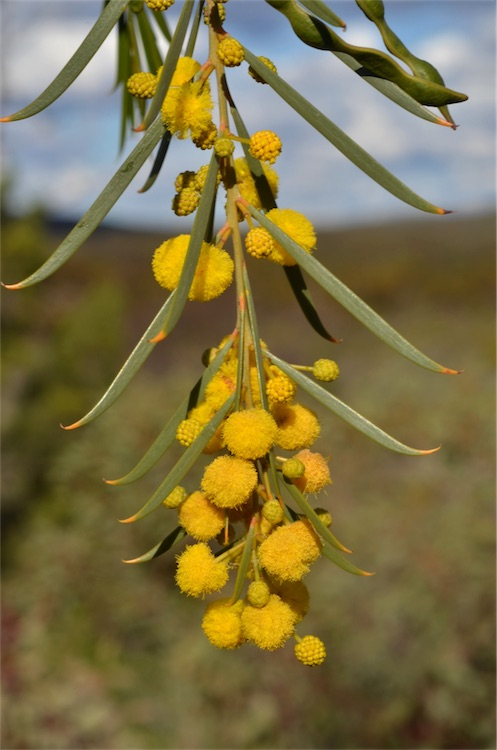
Subsp. oblanceolata in Gawler Ranges National Park

Acacia euthycarpa is a species of flowering plant in the family Fabaceae and is endemic to south-eastern continental Australia. It is a shrub, occasionally a tree, with glabrous branchlets, narrowly linear to lance-shaped phyllodes, spherical to shortly oblong heads of golden yellow flowers and linear pods.

== Description ==
Acacia euthycarpa is usually a shrub that typically grows to a height of 2–4 m (6 ft 7 in – 13 ft 1 in), but is occasionally a tree up to 10 m (33 ft). Its new shoots and branchlets are glabrous. The phyllodes are linear to lance-shaped with the narrower end towards the base, mostly 20–100 mm (0.79–3.94 in) long and 1–6 mm (0.039–0.236 in) wide. The flowers are borne in spherical to shortly oblong heads on a peduncle 3–10 mm (0.12–0.39 in) long, each head with usually 25 to 60 golden yellow flowers. Flowering occurs from August to October, and the pods are linear, leathery to more or less crusty, up to about 150 mm (5.9 in) long and 3.5–7 mm (0.14–0.28 in) wide and glabrous. The seeds are oblong to elliptic, 4–6 mm (0.16–0.24 in) long and dull to slightly shiny dark brown to black, with a club-shaped aril.

== Taxonomy ==
This taxon was first formally described in 1923 by John McConnell Black who gave it the name Acacia calamifolia var. euthycarpa in the Transactions of the Royal Society of South Australia. It was subsequently promoted to species status as A. euthycarpa in 1945 by Black in a later edition of the same journal. The specific epithet (euthycarpa) means 'straight fruit', referring to the sides of the fruit.

In 2002, Stephen Henry Wright, James Walter Grimes and Pauline Y. Ladiges described two subspecies of A. euthycarpa in the journal Muelleria, and the names are accepted by the Australian Plant Census:

- Acacia euthycarpa (J.M.Black) J.M.Black subsp. euthycarpa has narrowly linear phyllodes, 0.7–2 mm (0.028–0.079 in) wide.
- Acacia euthycarpa subsp. oblanceolata S.Wright (formerly known as Acacia euthycarpa var. oblanceolata) has narrowly lance-shaped phyllodes with the narrower end towards the base, 2.5–6 mm (0.098–0.236 in) wide.

== Distribution and habitat ==
Acacia euthycarpa occurs from Mount Finke, the Gawler Ranges, Eyre Peninsula, Kangaroo Island and the Barossa Ranges to Goolwa in South Australia and eastward to the Murray Mallee in north-western Victoria.

- Subspecies euthycarpa is found mostly in scrub or woodland and is common in the west and central west of Victoria, and the Eyre Peninsula, southern Mount Lofty Ranges and Murray Lands of South Australia.
- * Subspecies oblanceolata is found in scrub or open woodland, often on rocky sites, and is only known from the Wychitella Flora and Fauna Reserve and Yowang Hill (in central western Victoria), and near Kimba on the Eyre Peninsula and near Murray Bridge (although the specimen from near Murray Bridge was collected in 1848, and may no longer be there).

== Ecology ==
This species is a food plant for larvae of the Icilius blue butterfly.
