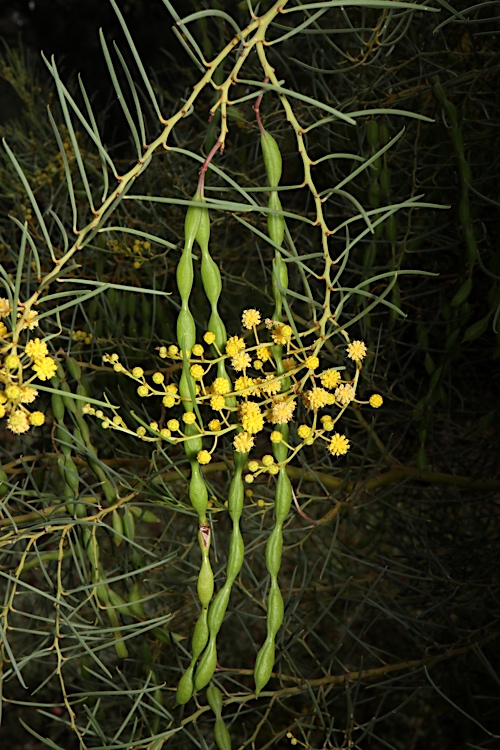

Scientific classification
- Kingdom: Plantae
- Clade: Tracheophytes
- Clade: Angiosperms
- Clade: Eudicots
- Clade: Rosids
- Order: Fabales
- Family: Fabaceae
- Subfamily: Caesalpinioideae
- Clade: Mimosoid clade
- Genus: Acacia
- Species: A. calamifolia

Binomial name
- Acacia calamifolia Sweet ex. Lindl.
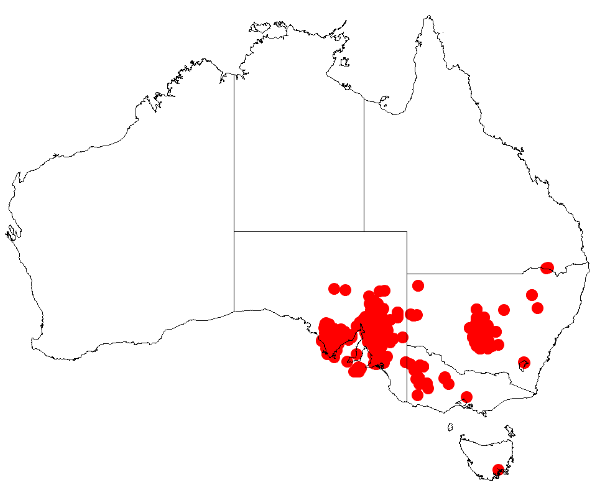
- Occurrence data from AVH

Synonyms
- Racosperma calamifolium (Sweet ex Lindl.) Pedley; Acacia calamifolia var. pulverulenta Domin; Acacia pulverulenta A.Cunn. ex Benth. nom. illeg.; Acacia uncinata G.Lodd.

= Acacia calamifolia =

Wallowa

Species of plant

Acacia calamifolia, commonly known as wallowa, reed-leaf wattle or other common names, is a species of flowering plant in the family Fabaceae and is endemic to south-eastern continental Australia. It is an erect or spreading shrub with narrowly linear, terete or flat phyllodes, spherical heads of pale yellow to golden yellow flowers, and straight to curved or twisted, leathery pods.

== Description ==
Acacia calamifolia is an erect or spreading shrub that typically grows to a height of 1.5–4 m (4 ft 11 in – 13 ft 1 in) and usually 2 to 4 m (6 ft 7 in to 13 ft 1 in), The phyllodes are narrowly linear, round or flat in cross section, mostly 25–95 mm (0.98–3.74 in) long and 1.0–1.5 mm (0.039–0.059 in) wide with a delicate, curved point on the end.

The flowers are borne in 2 to 8 spherical or oblong heads in racemes 10–25 mm (0.39–0.98 in) long on peduncle 4–10 mm (0.16–0.39 in) long, each head with about 28 to 46 pale yellow to golden yellow flowers. Flowering occurs in October and November and the pods are more or less woody to crust-like, appearing somewhat like a string of beads, usually 150 mm (5.9 in) long and 3–6 mm (0.12–0.24 in) wide containing dark brown to black oblong seeds, 6–9 mm (0.24–0.35 in) long with a club-shaped aril.

== Taxonomy ==
Acacia calamifolia was first formally described in 1824 by John Lindley in Edwards's Botanical Register from an unpublished description by Robert Sweet. The specific epithet is taken from the Latin words calamus meaning 'reed' and folium meaning 'leaf', in reference to the shape of the phyllodes.

This species is sometimes also known as willow, broom wattle, sandhill wattle or reed-leaved wattle.

The name A. calamifolia is misapplied to Acacia euthycarpa in Victoria.

== Distribution ==
Wallowa is found in South Australia from the Flinders Ranges in the north, south to the Tothill Ranges in the northern Mount Lofty Ranges, east to Broken Hill and between Nymagee and Griffith in New South Wales. It is often a part of woodland and open scrubland communities where it grows in a variety of soil types different soils.

== Ecology ==
This species provides habitat for birds and the seeds are and an important part of the Mallee fowl's diet.

== Use in horticulture ==
Wallowa is a medium-sized ornamental wattle that is suitable as a low shelter plant. It can tolerate full sun or part shade and prefers a well-drained soil, but can endure short periods of water logging. It is drought and frost tolerant to −7 °C (19 °F).

== See also ==
- List of Acacia species
