= Port Clinton, Queensland =

Harbour in Queensland, Australia

Coordinates: 22°31′S 150°44′E

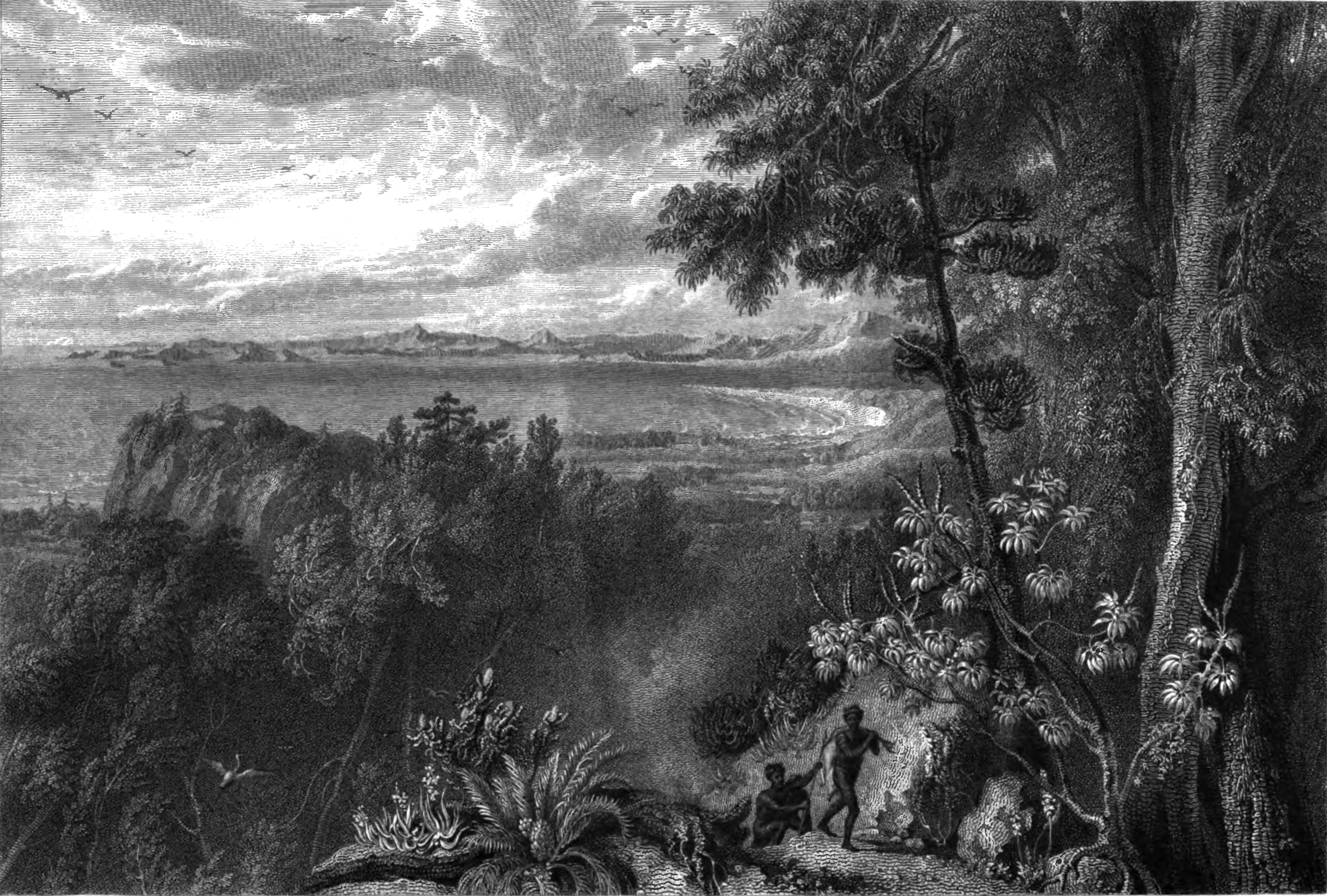
View of Port Bowen (Port Clinton) in 1802 drawn by William Westall

Port Clinton is an estuarine harbour and inlet located on the eastern side of the Warginburra Peninsula of central coastal Queensland. It was previously known as Port Bowen, which was the name given to the harbour by Captain Matthew Flinders in 1802. The title was changed in 1892 to Port Clinton so as to avoid confusion with the port of Bowen approximately 400 km to the north-west.
