= Kooyoora State Park =

- IUCN category II (national park)
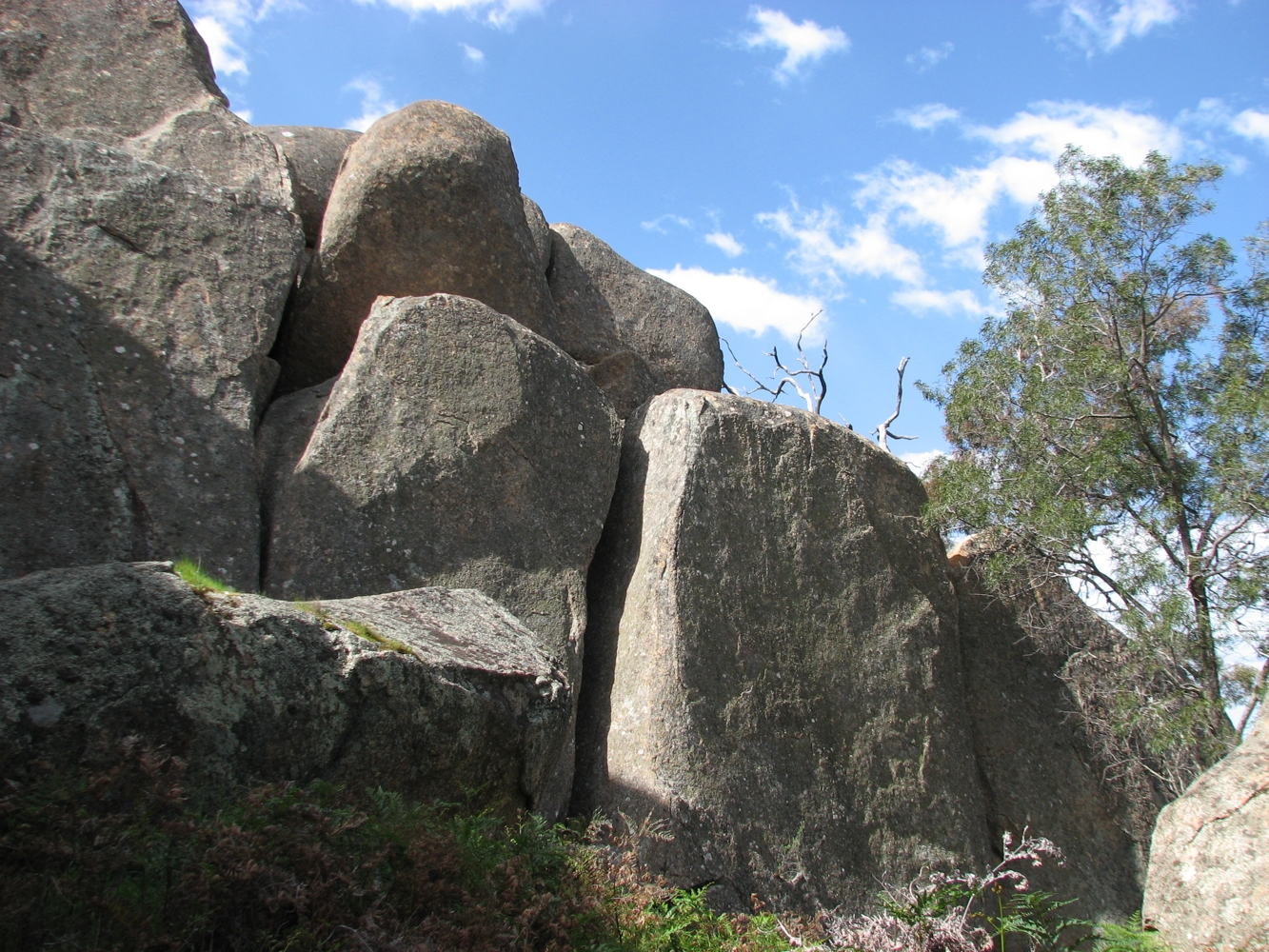
- Granite outcrops at Melville Caves

- Location within Victoria
- Location: Victoria
- Nearest city: Inglewood
- Coordinates: 36°36′03″S 143°41′34″E
- Area: 113.5 km^{2} (43.8 sq mi)
- Established: 1985
- Governing body: Parks Victoria
- Website: Official website

Kooyoora State Park is a state park in Brenanah, Victoria, Australia located 220 kilometres (140 mi) northwest of Melbourne, and 12 kilometres (7.5 mi) west of Inglewood. It is a 11,350-hectare (28,000-acre) reserve comprising box-ironbark forest and rocky granite outcrops, including the Melville Caves. Popular activities include bird watching, horse riding, camping, caving, rock climbing, fossicking, and bush walking. Facilities include walking tracks, lookouts, a campground, toilets, and a picnic ground complete with a covered shelter featuring a stone fireplace with chimney named Catto Lodge. This lodge was named after local resident Stanley Ross Catto who worked tirelessly to develop the park.

Kooyoora State Park was proclaimed in 1985. The original inhabitants of the area were the Jaara people, who used the rock caves and shelters for protection from the weather. European settlers moved into the area in the 1840s, and gold mining commenced in the late 1850s. The bushranger Captain Melville is believed to have used the area as a hideout.

The native grasslands provide a food source for kangaroos and wallabies. Key tree species include Blakely's red gum, yellow and grey box and red ironbark.
