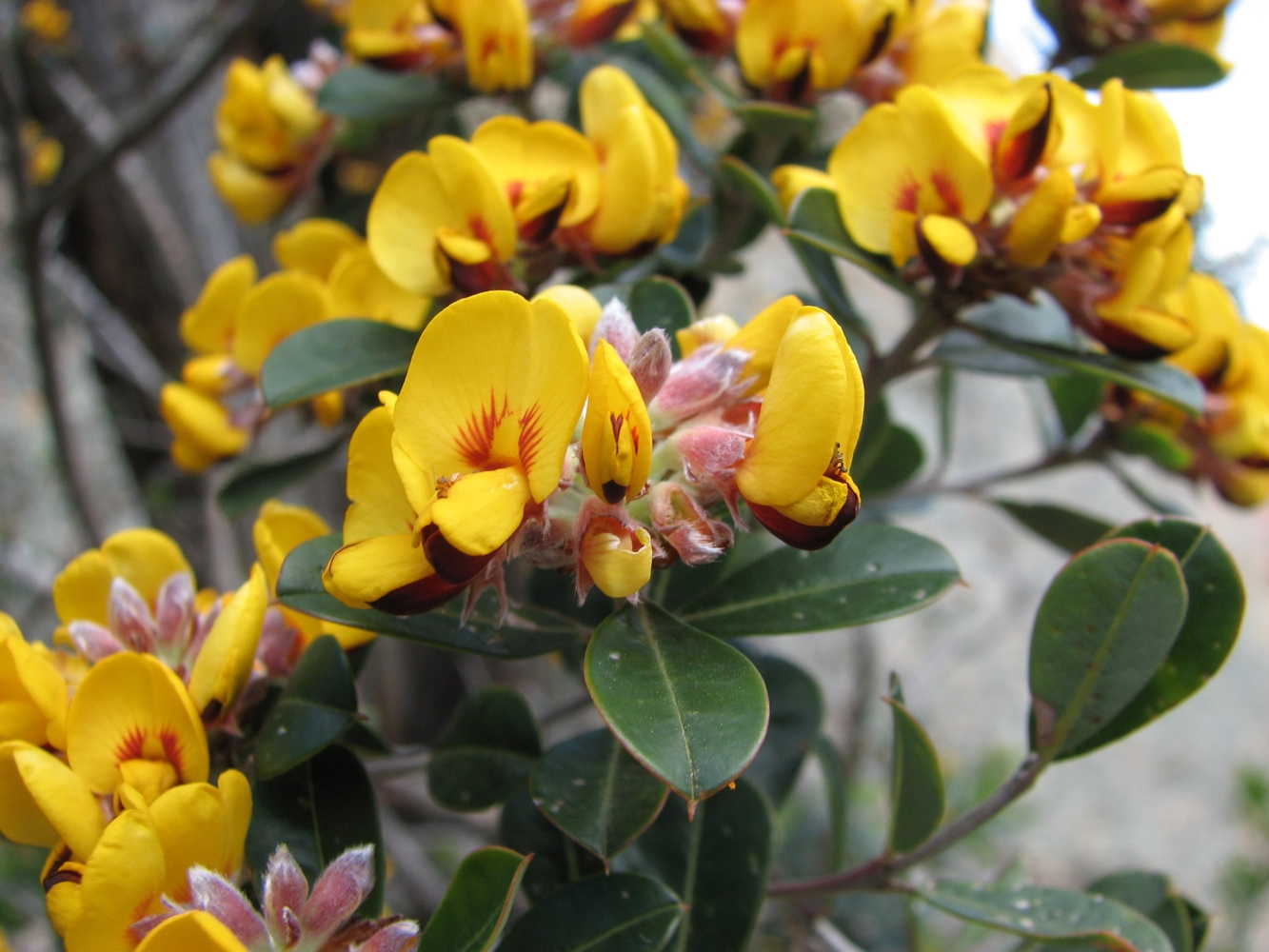
- Pultenaea daphnoides in Kooyoora State Park

Scientific classification
- Kingdom: Plantae
- Clade: Tracheophytes
- Clade: Angiosperms
- Clade: Eudicots
- Clade: Rosids
- Order: Fabales
- Family: Fabaceae
- Subfamily: Faboideae
- Clade: Mirbelioids
- Genus: Pultenaea; Sm.

Type species
- Pultenaea stipularis

Species
- See List of Pultenaea species
- Range of Pultenaea Sm.

Synonyms
- Bartlingia Brongn. nom. illeg.; Spadostyles Benth.

= Pultenaea =

Genus of legumes

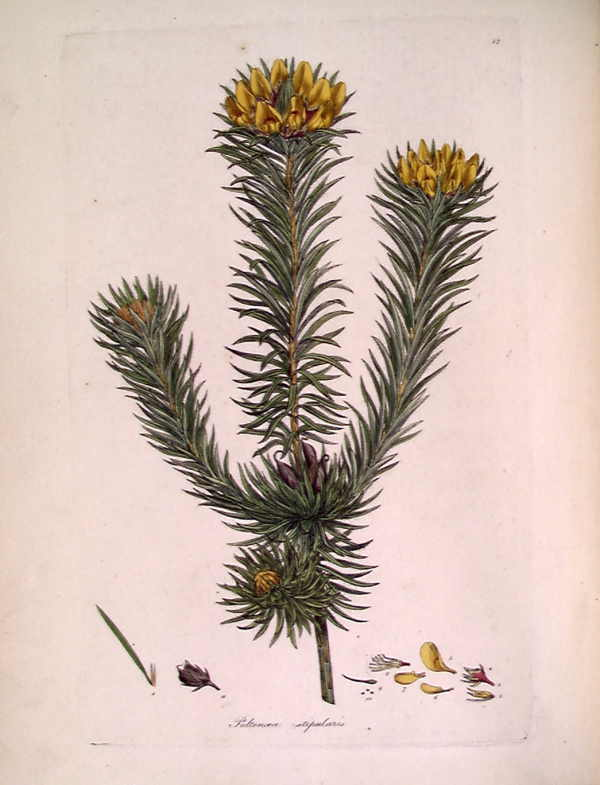
An illustration of Pultenaea stipularis by James Sowerby which appeared in A Specimen of the Botany of New Holland in 1794.

Pultenaea is a genus of flowering plants in the family Fabaceae. It includes 127 species which are endemic to Australia. Plants in this genus are shrubs with simple leaves and orange or yellow flowers similar to others in the family but with the standard petal equal to or slightly longer than the other petals.

== Description ==
Plants in the genus Pultenaea are erect to low-lying or prostrate shrubs with simple leaves usually arranged alternately, usually with papery stipules. The flowers are usually orange or yellow with red marking and usually arranged in leaf axils, often in a condensed raceme near the ends of branchlets. There are bracts that are sometimes replaced by enlarged leaf stipules and the bracteoles are usually attached to the base of the sepal tube. The standard petal is equal in length or only slightly longer than the keel and wings. All ten stamens are free from each other, the ovary is usually sessile and the fruit is a small, egg-shaped pod with the remains of the style attached.

== Taxonomy ==
The genus Pultenaea was first formally described by botanist James Edward Smith in 1794 in A Specimen of the Botany of New Holland. The first species he described was P. stipularis from a living specimen raised in Stockwell, England from seed obtained from New South Wales in 1792. Smith named the genus in honour of Richard Pulteney, an English surgeon and botanist, who also was the biographer of Linnaeus.

=== Species list ===
See List of Pultenaea species

=== Phylogeny ===
Pultenaea belongs to the Mirbelioid clade of the legume subfamily Faboideae. Pultenaea is paraphyletic with respect to several of the other mirbelioid genera.

The genus is not considered to be monophyletic with suggestions of splitting it into six separate subgenera, under a larger genus of Pultenaea sensu lato, which would include 19 out of 25 genera included in the former tribe Mirbelieae. In 2024 Russell L. Barrett et al. analysed recent phylogenetic data and found five distinct lineages, which the authors recognised as distinct genera. Pultenaea sensu stricto contains the most species, all native to eastern Australia except for P. tenuifolia R.Br. & Sims which ranges into Western Australia. Euchilus was reinstated with eight species native to south-west Western Australia and South Australia. Three new genera, Grievea (2 species), Jennata (9 species), and Loricobbia (6 species), were described, which are all endemic to south-west Western Australia.

=== Speciation ===
The Mirbelioids have had long isolation in Australia from other Fabaceae families. Pultenaea Sm. underwent explosive starburst radiation during the late Miocene, due to aridity. Geographic speciation factors include east vs. west endemism due to increased aridity and the development of the Nullarbor Plain; subgenera Pultenaea and Corrickosa of eastern Australia split along the Winter–Summer rainfall boundary; subclades within Corrickosa diverged due to marine incursions between South Australia and Victoria. Western Australian species include disjunctions between north and south, and Esperance/Cape Arid. Recent extinctions, possibly due to changed fire regimes and grazing pressure, include P. elusa and P. maidenii.

== Distribution ==
Species of Pultenaea occur in all Australian states and the Australian Capital Territory but not the Northern Territory.

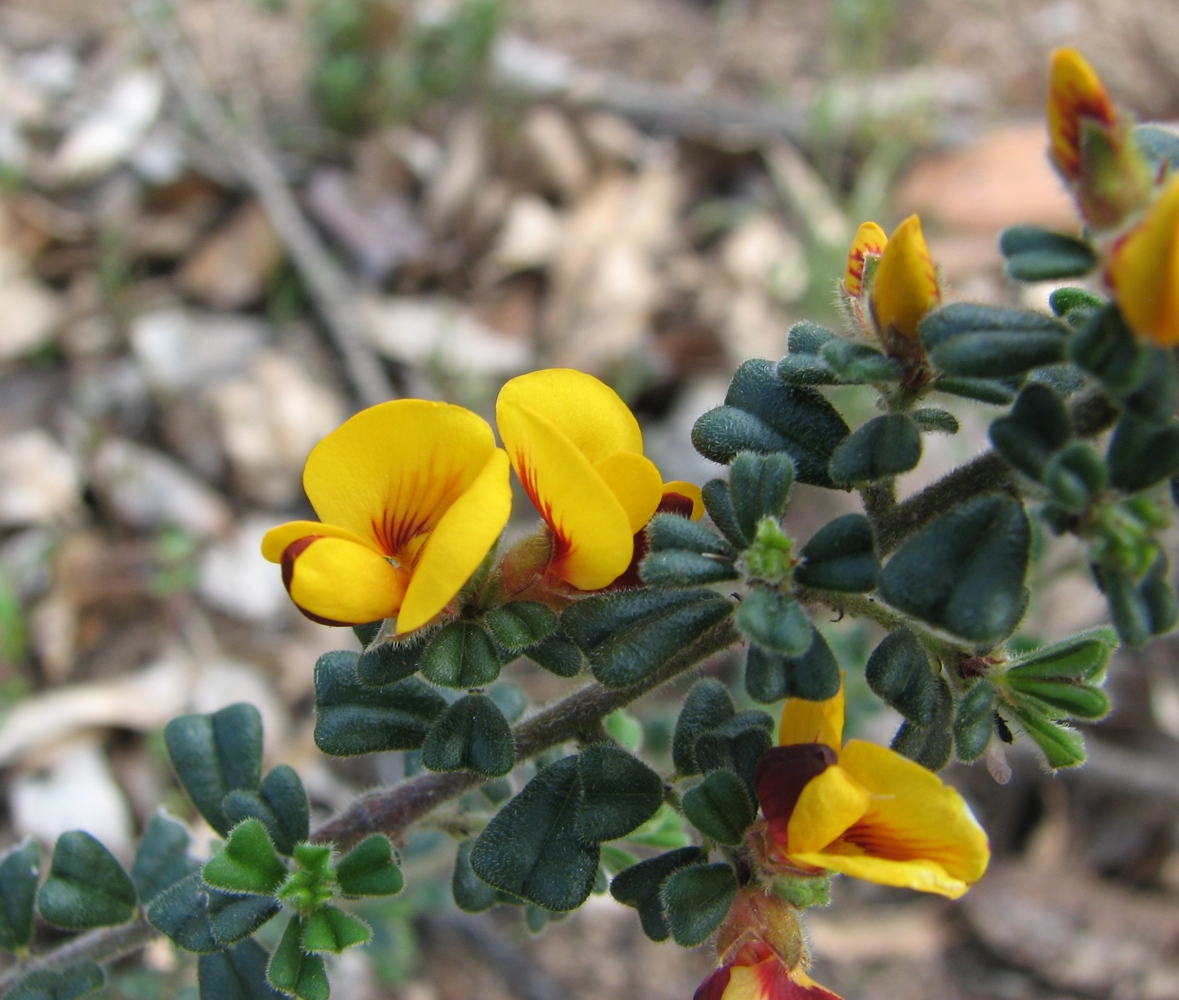
Pultenaea scabra in Brisbane Ranges National Park, Victoria

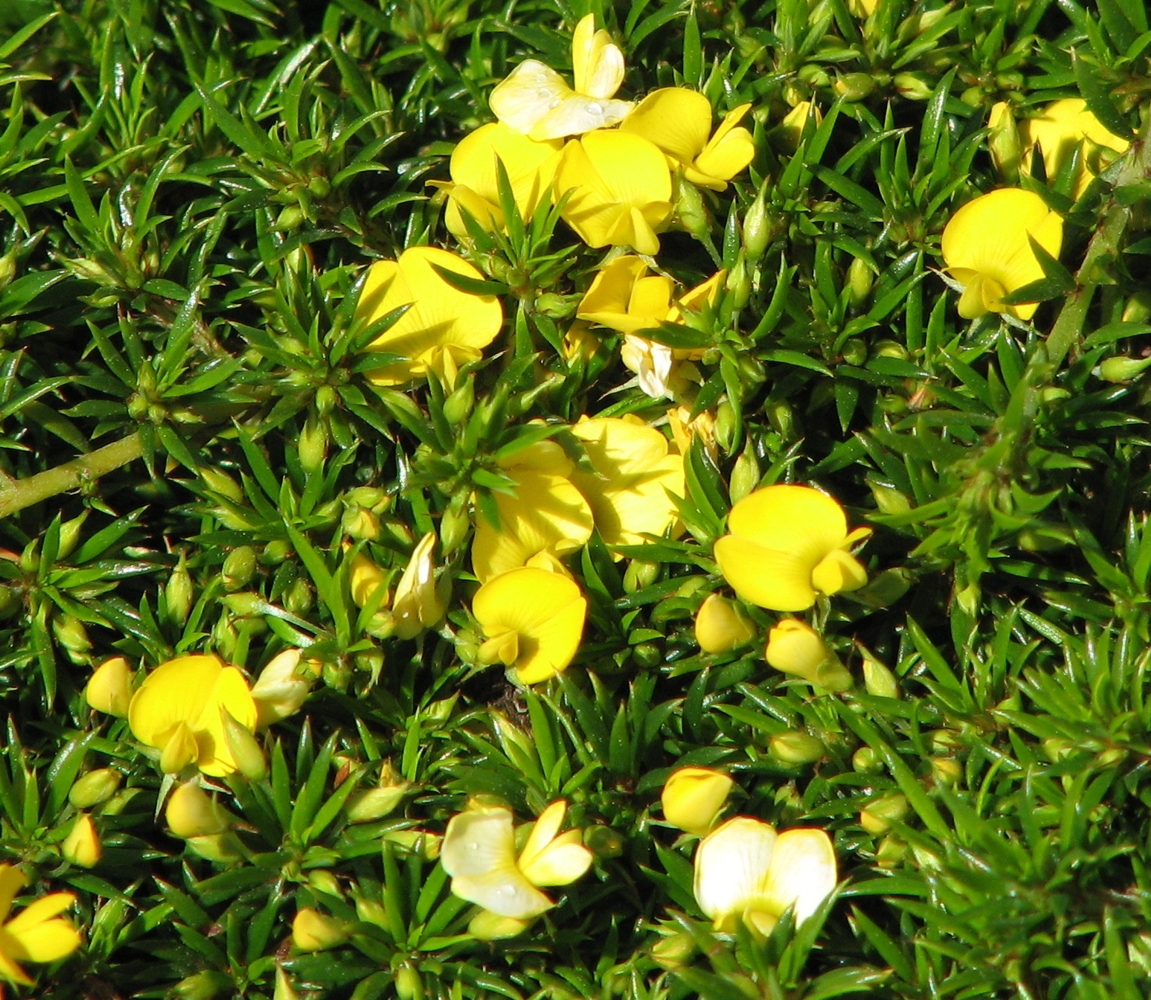
Pultenaea pedunculata

== Use in horticulture ==
A number of species are cultivated for their spring flower display. Most of these are fast-growing and adaptable to diverse growing conditions. Propagation is from semi-mature cuttings or seed pre-treated by soaking in hot water.

Three cultivars are registered with the Australian Cultivar Registration Authority:

- Pultenaea pedunculata 'Pyalong Gold'
- Pultenaea pedunculata 'Pyalong Pink'
- Pultenaea villosa 'Wallum Gold'—a prostrate form
