= Euchilus =

Scientific classification
- Kingdom: Plantae
- Clade: Tracheophytes
- Clade: Angiosperms
- Clade: Eudicots
- Clade: Rosids
- Order: Fabales
- Family: Fabaceae
- Subfamily: Papilionoideae
- Tribe: Mirbelieae
- Genus: Euchilus; R.Br.

Species
- 8; see text

Genus of flowering plants

Euchilus is a genus of flowering plants in the family Fabaceae. It includes eight species native to southern Western Australia and southern South Australia.

== Species ==
Eight species are accepted.

- Euchilus aridus (E.Pritz.) R.L.Barrett & Orthia
- Euchilus calycinus Turcz.
- Euchilus daena (Orthia & Chappill) Orthia & R.L.Barrett
- Euchilus elachistus (F.Muell.) R.L.Barrett & Orthia
- Euchilus obcordatus R.Br.
- Euchilus purpureus Turcz.
- Euchilus rotundifolius Turcz.
- Euchilus spinulosus Turcz.
