= Anne Rudge =

British artist (1761–1836)

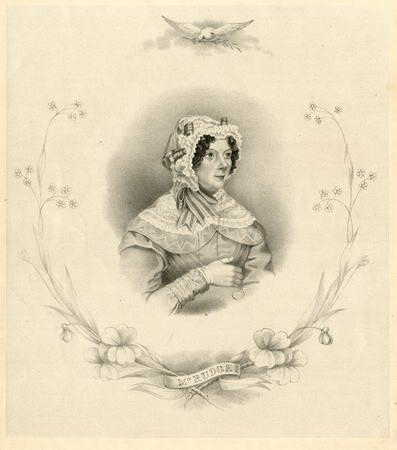
Anne Rudge

Anne Rudge (29 October 1761 – 1 September 1836) was a British botanical illustrator who illustrated the works of her husband, the botanist Edward Rudge and her son, the barrister and antiquary Edward John Rudge, among others. She is one of the earliest known published female botanical artists, as, unlike many other female artists in her field at that time, she signed her work.

== Early life ==
She was born in London in 1761 as Anne Nouaille, the daughter of Elizabeth née de la Mare and Peter Nouaille (1723–1809). Of Huguenot descent, Peter Nouaille's family originated from Nismes in France, his father having migrated to England to escape persecution. A silk manufacturer and Justice of the Peace of Sevenoaks in Kent, after spending some time in Italy in his early life, in the 1790s Peter Nouaille was briefly a partner of George Courtauld, the founder of Courtaulds. The Nouaille family business was inherited by Anne's brother, also named Peter Nouaille. She married the botanist and antiquary Edward Rudge (1763-1846) at St. George's church in Hanover Square in London on 28 July 1791. Their children were: the barrister and antiquary Edward John Rudge (1792–1861), Anne Eliza Rudge (1797–1879) and the barrister Samuel Nouaille Rudge (1801–1865).

== Botanical illustrator ==
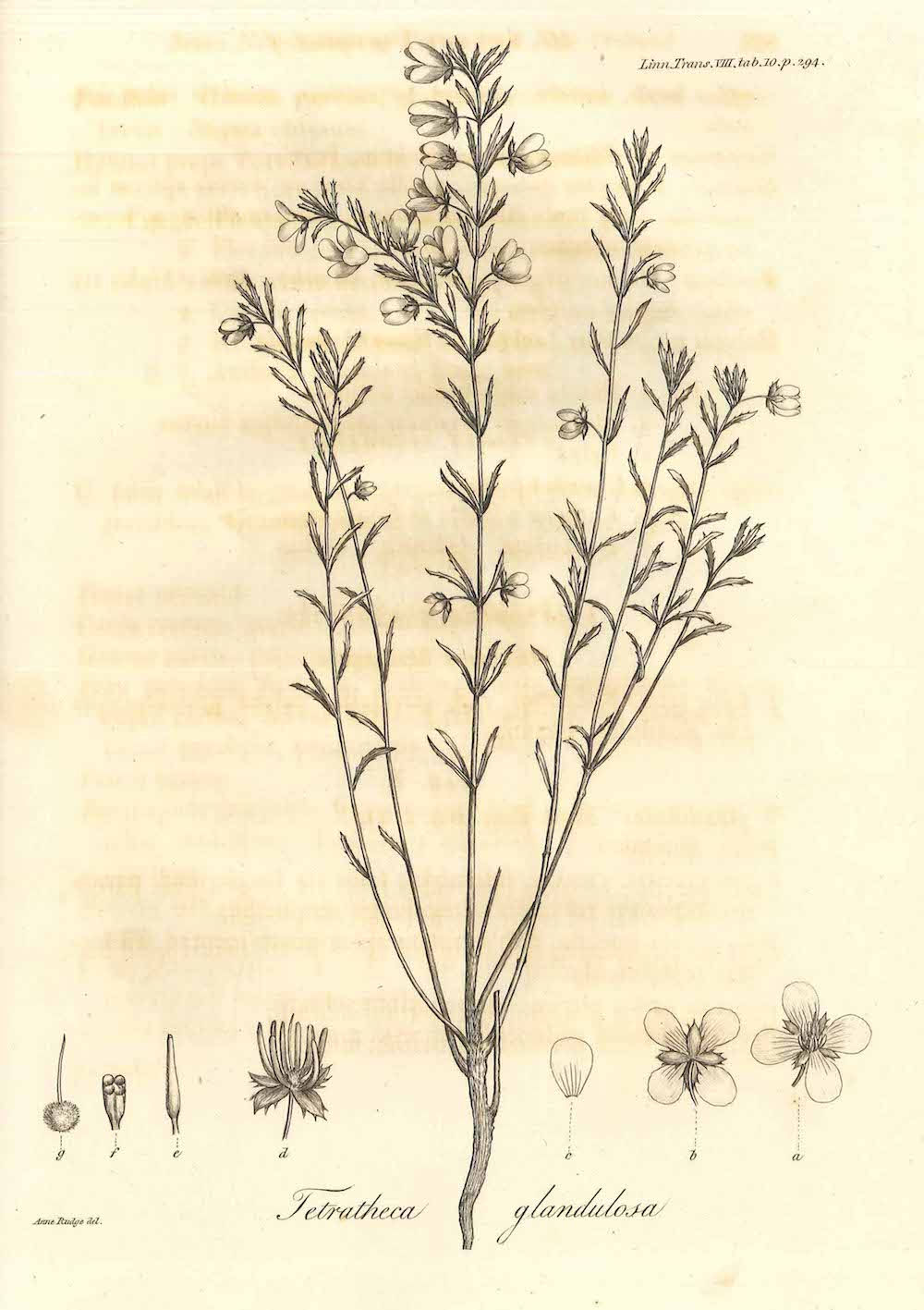
Rudge's illustration for Tetratheca glandulosa (1807)

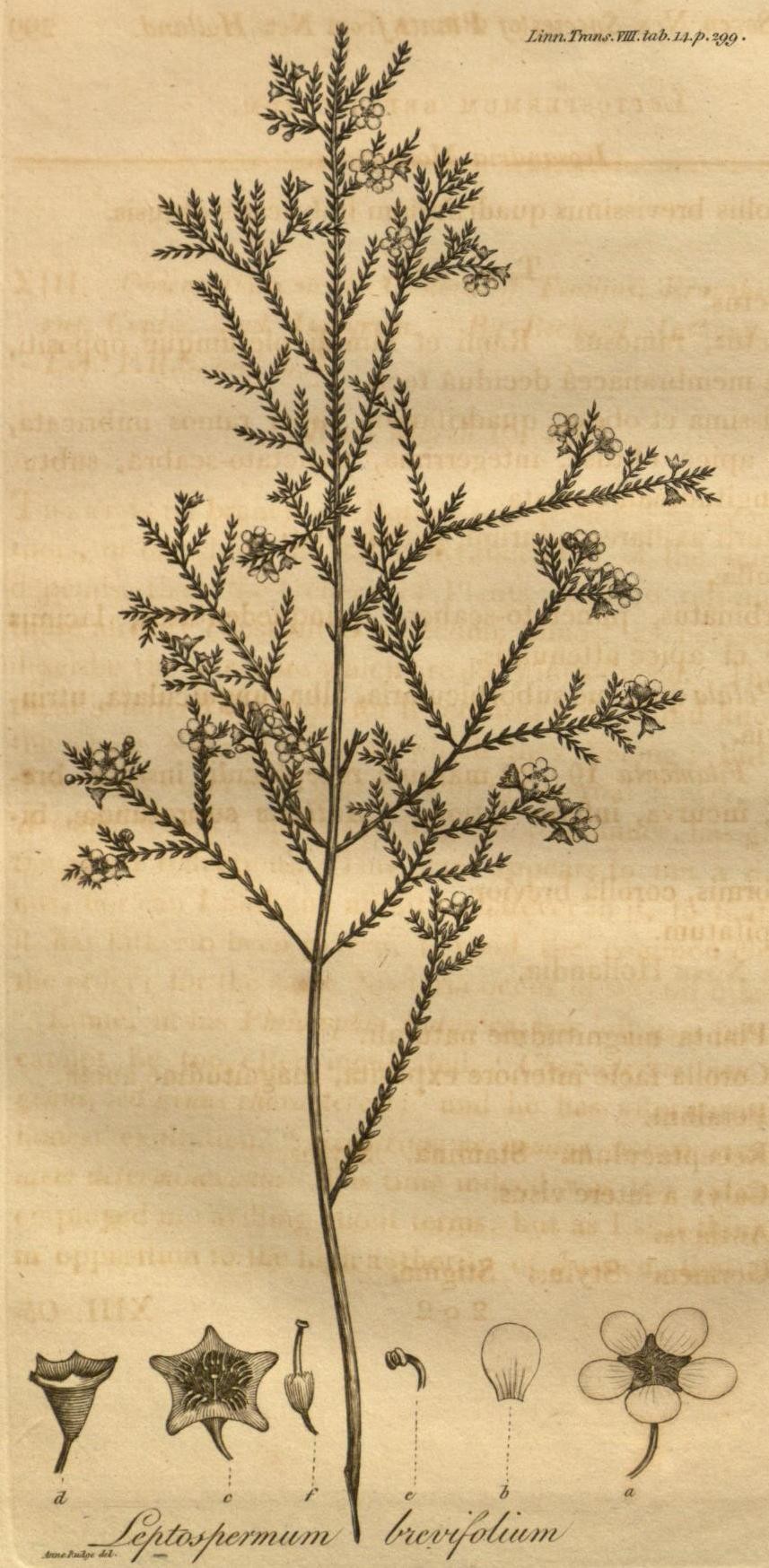
Rudge's illustration for Baeckea brevifolia as Leptospermum brevifolium (1807)

The first evidence for her printmaking is a group of etchings of 1799. Rudge generally gave her prints plate numbers at the top of the plate. Under her husband's tuition she became skilled in accurate, precise and detailed botanical illustration, providing fifty plates for his Plantarum Guianæ rariorum icones et descriptiones hactenus ineditæ (1805–07), in addition to drawing the illustrations for the papers her husband wrote for the Linnean Society in 1811, being familiar with Linnean classification. Her drawings accurately depict the detail required by botanical researchers including the reproductive sections of plants. Such was her fame in the botanical world that a species of water lily was named after her.

At her father's insistence she received an excellent education, being proficient in modern and ancient languages, in music and in art, excelling particularly in the latter. By the time of her marriage she was able to accurately depict landscapes and natural history. Her husband instructed her in the skills necessary to be a successful scientific and botanical illustrator, in which she exhibited "... a consistent style and exacting detail in the sections on her plates [that] could only have come from intense personal study and interest. Her drawings are large, bold, clear and precise. Plants are reduced to their very essence in her art, with simple outlines that help clarify detail and complexity for the botanical reader."

On her death in 1836 her husband wrote in a memoir of her that her :

...father bestowed his particular attention in the cultivation of her mind, improving to a high degree a natural taste for those accomplishments which he himself possessed in so eminent a degree. His house, which was constantly frequented by the most distinguished literary characters of the time, both foreign and native, afforded her the opportunity of acquiring a perfect knowledge of the modern languages, and besides French, Italian, and Spanish, she obtained a competent acquaintance with the Latin, and since, with the friendly assistance of the late Reverend Stephen Weston, studied with considerable success the Hebrew, for the purpose of reading the Bible in the original.

Her proficiency in music was of the first excellence, executing the most difficult passages of the most eminent authors with the utmost facility at sight; and the refined taste with which she performed the favourite compositions of Handel, Scarlatti, and other authors of the ancient music, never failed to rivet the attention of her auditors.

Her skill in drawing and etching was equal if not superior, to her knowledge of music, copying from nature only with fidelity and precision, both in landscape and natural history; her knowledge of botany, acquired from the instructions of her husband, enabled her to illustrate his treatises on various new species of plants from New Holland, &c. published in the 7th, 8th, 9th, 10th, and 11th volumes of the Transactions of the Linnean Society, as well as his work on the unpublished plants of Guiana in fifty folio plates; in all of which, the magnified parts of fructification, so difficult to be developed from dried specimens, are drawn with the utmost precision and accuracy, by which she obtained a perfect knowledge of the admirable and wonderful formation of flowers and of the physiology of vegetation.

Her labours in the science of botany were duly appreciated on the continent, by her name being given, (in compliment to the excellence of her drawings,) to a species of the Genus Nymphaea or Water Lilly, by Dr. G. F. W. Meyer, of Gottingen, in his elegant work on the new plants of Essequiboe, wherein he has justly distinguished her abilities by classing her with those celebrated botanists, Mrs. Elizabeth Blackwell, Misses Lawrance and Hutchins, and Mrs. Dawson Turner and her two daughters Maria and Elizabeth, who have embellished the various botanical works of their relatives with their drawings...

She also illustrated with her drawings, both her husband's and eldest son's communications to the Society of Antiquaries in the Archaeologia, vol. 17, as well as in the 5th vol. of the Vetusta Monumenta, on the antiquities discovered in tracing the foundations of the entire buildings of the Abbey Church of Evesham...

She died in 1836 after a painful illness lasting five weeks and was buried in the Rudge family vault in St Lawrence's church in Evesham. On the day of her funeral the local public houses closed as a sign of respect. On his death her husband was buried with her.
