= C. gardneri =

C. gardneri may refer to:

- Ceropegia elegans, a plant species found in Sri Lanka
- Chlaenosciadium gardneri, a flowering plant species

== See also ==
- Gardneri
