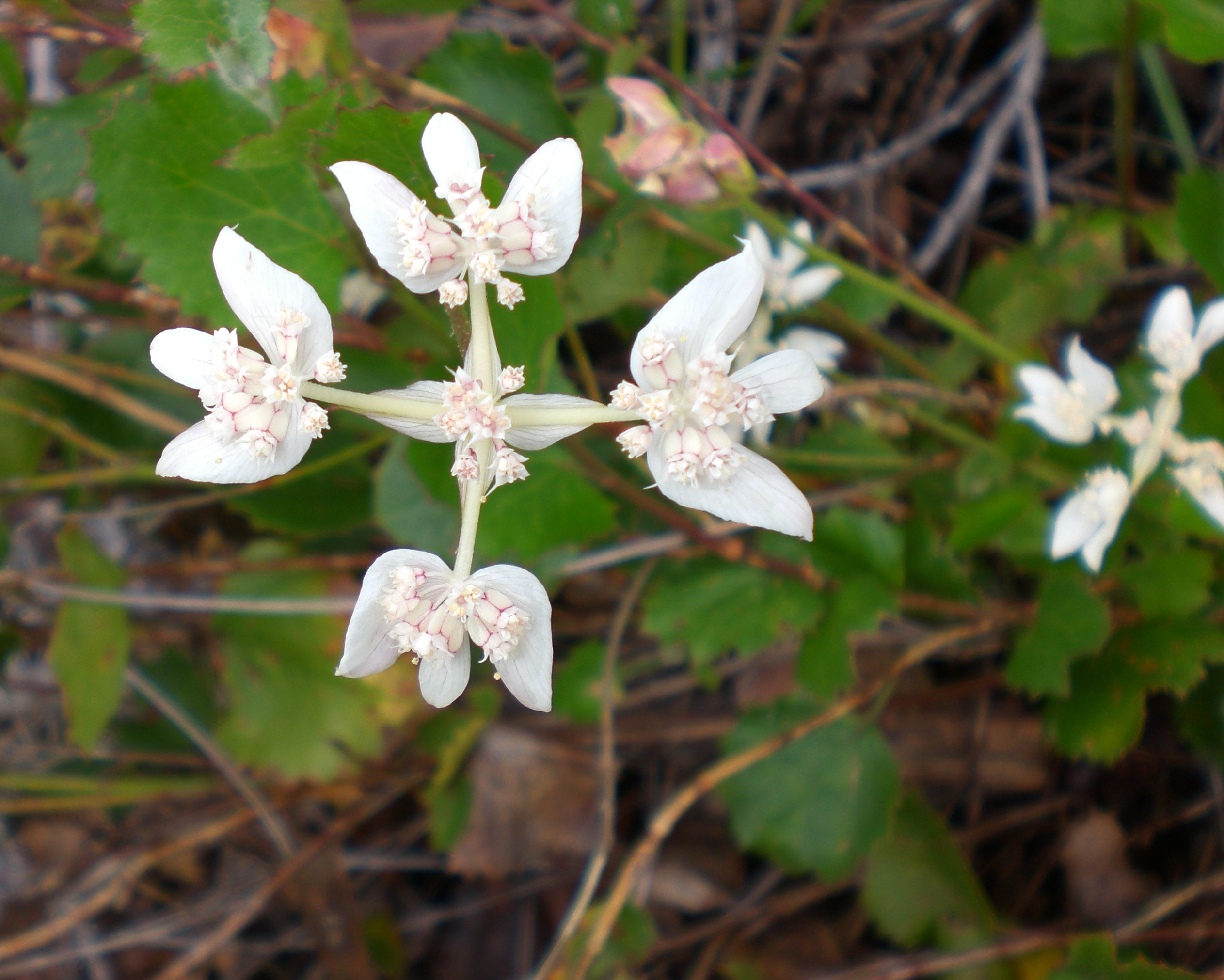
- Xanthosia rotundifolia

Scientific classification
- Kingdom: Plantae
- Clade: Tracheophytes
- Clade: Angiosperms
- Clade: Eudicots
- Clade: Asterids
- Order: Apiales
- Family: Apiaceae
- Subfamily: Mackinlayoideae; Plunkett & Lowry

Genera
- Actinotus; Apiopetalum; Centella; Chlaenosciadium; Mackinlaya; Micropleura; Pentapeltis; Schoenolaena; Xanthosia

= Mackinlayoideae =

Subfamily of flowering plants

Mackinlayoideae is a subfamily of plants containing about nine genera. In the APG II system it was treated at family rank as Mackinlayaceae, but since then it has been reclassified as a subfamily of Apiaceae.

Platysace, which has been placed in this subfamily, is sister to all the remaining Apiaceae genera according to a 2021 molecular phylogenetic study, so is excluded from the subfamily.
