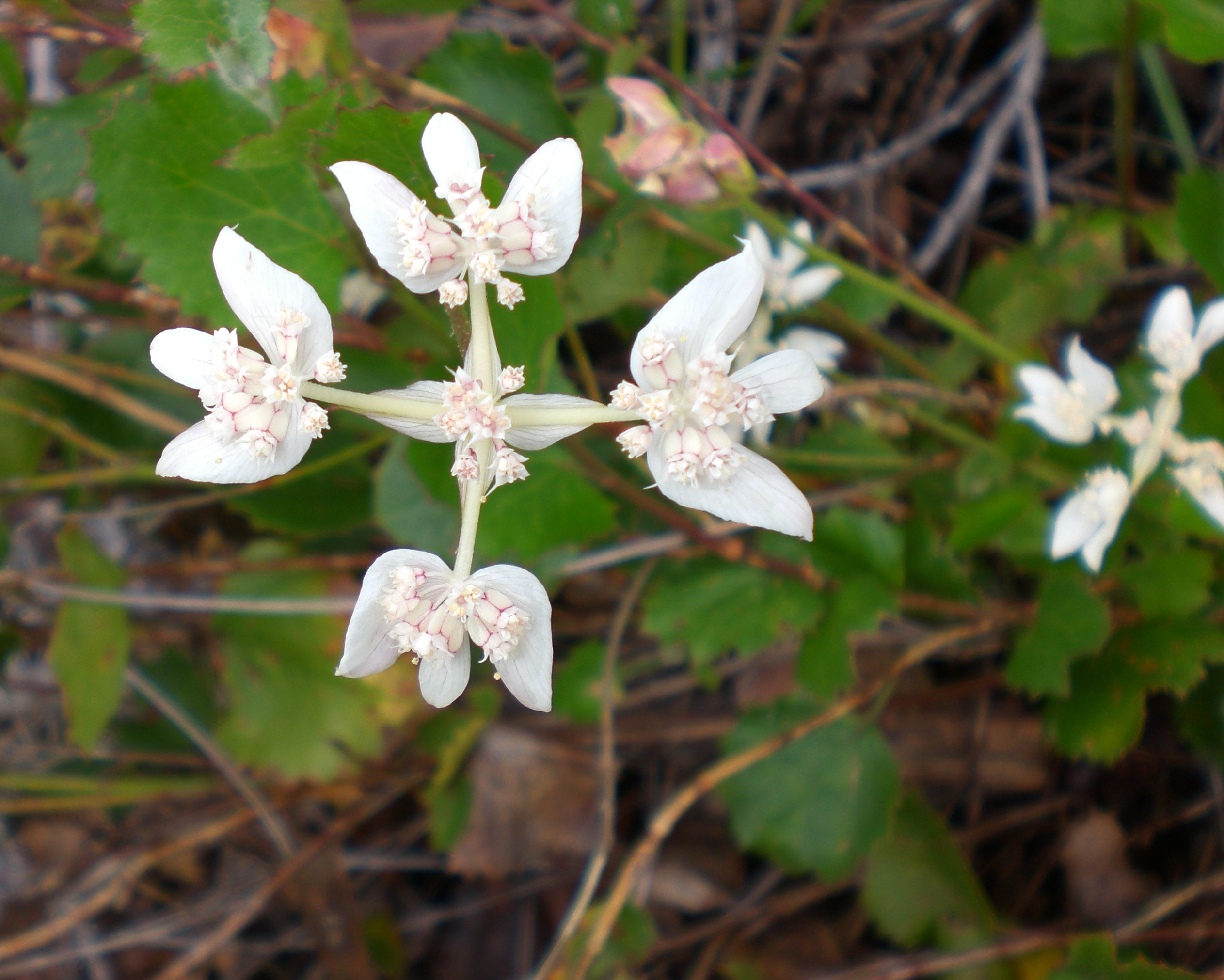
- Xanthosia rotundifolia near Torndirrup

Scientific classification
- Kingdom: Plantae
- Clade: Tracheophytes
- Clade: Angiosperms
- Clade: Eudicots
- Clade: Asterids
- Order: Apiales
- Family: Apiaceae
- Subfamily: Mackinlayoideae
- Genus: Xanthosia; Rudge

Species
- See text

Synonyms
- Leucolaena R.Br. nom. inval., nom. nud.; Leucolaena (DC.) Benth.; Xanthosia sect. Euxanthosia DC. nom. inval.; Xanthosia sect. Leucolaena DC.

= Xanthosia =

Genus of shrubs

Xanthosia is a genus of flowering plants in the family Apiaceae and is endemic to Australia. It comprises 20 species of shrubs endemic to Australia. Plants in the genus Xanthosia are perennial herbs or small shrubs, the leaves divided, toothed or lobed, (rarely simple), the flowers white, pinkish or pale green and usually arranged in a compound umbel.

== Description ==
Plants in the genus Xanthosia are perennial herbs or small shrubs that usually have divided, toothed, or lobed leaves. The flowers are usually arranged in a compound umbel, opposite leaves or on the ends of short, leafy branches, but sometimes reduced to a single flower. Each main branch of the umbel has an involucral bract and each of the secondary umbels ("umbellules") have 2 or 3 bracteoles at the base. The flowers are white, pinkish or pale green with conspicuous, usually egg-shaped, petal-like sepals, the petals narrow and curved inwards. The fruit is a flattened, oblong or round, non-fleshy schizocarp.

== Taxonomy ==
The genus Xanthosia was first formally described in 1811 by Edward Rudge in the Transactions of the Linnean Society of London, and the first species he described, (the type species) was Xanthosia pilosa. The name Xanthosia means "yellow", referring to the colour of the hairs on some species.

=== Species list ===
The following is a list of species of Xanthosia accepted by the Australian Plant Census at May 2023:

- Xanthosia atkinsoniana F.Muell. (W.A., N.S.W.)
- Xanthosia candida (Benth.) Steud. (W.A.)
- Xanthosia ciliata Hook. (W.A.)
- Xanthosia collina Keighery (W.A.)
- Xanthosia dissecta Hook.f. (N.S.W., Vic., Tas.) cut-leaved xanthosia
- Xanthosia eichleri J.M.Hart & Henwood (W.A.)
- Xanthosia fruticulosa Benth. (W.A.)
- Xanthosia huegelii (Benth.) Steud. – heath xanthosia (W.A., S.A., Vic.)
- Xanthosia kochii (E.Pritz.) J.M.Hart & Henwood (W.A.)
- Xanthosia leiophylla F.Muell. ex Klatt (S.A., Vic.)
- Xanthosia peduncularis Benth. (W.A.)
- Xanthosia pilosa Rudge – woolly xanthosia (Qld., N.S.W., Vic., Tas.)
- Xanthosia rotundifolia DC. – southern cross (W.A.)
- Xanthosia scopulicola J.M.Hart & Henwood (N.S.W.)
- Xanthosia singuliflora F.Muell. (W.A.)
- Xanthosia sp. Dardanup (B.J. Keighery & N. Gibson 174) (W.A.)
- Xanthosia stellata J.M.Hart & Henwood – star xanthosia (Qld., N.S.W., Vic.)
- Xanthosia tasmanica Domin (W.A., S.A., N.S.W., Vic., Tas.)
- Xanthosia ternifolia J.M.Hart & Henwood (N.S.W., Tas.)
- Xanthosia tomentosa A.S.George – Lesueur Southern Cross (W.A.)
- Xanthosia tridentata DC. rock xanthosia, hill xanthosia (N.S.W., Vic., Tas.)
