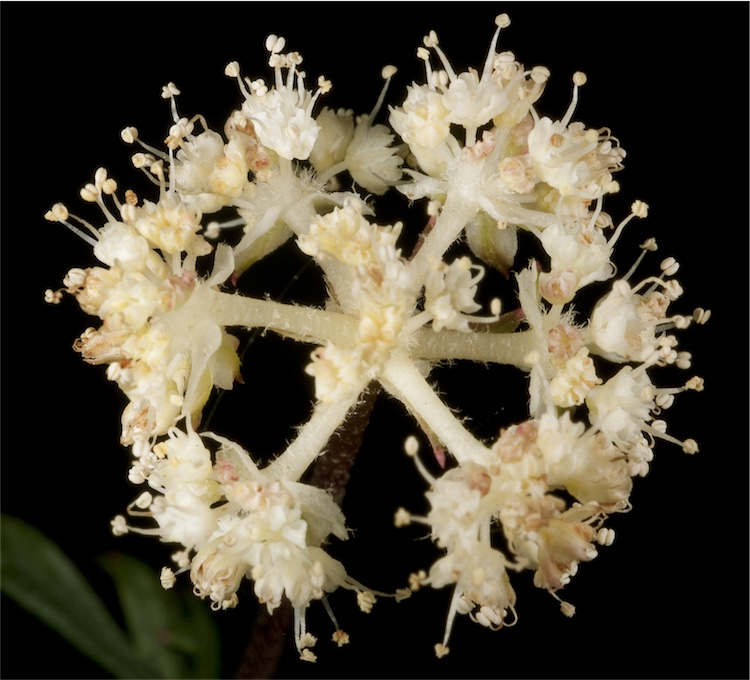
- Near the Coalseam Conservation Park

Scientific classification
- Kingdom: Plantae
- Clade: Tracheophytes
- Clade: Angiosperms
- Clade: Eudicots
- Clade: Asterids
- Order: Apiales
- Family: Apiaceae
- Genus: Xanthosia
- Species: X. kochii

Binomial name
- Xanthosia kochii (E.Pritz.) J.M.Hart & Henwood

Synonyms
- Platysace kochii (E.Pritz.) L.A.S.Johnson; Trachymene kochii E.Pritz.; Xanthosia bungei Keighery

= Xanthosia kochii =

Species of flowering plant

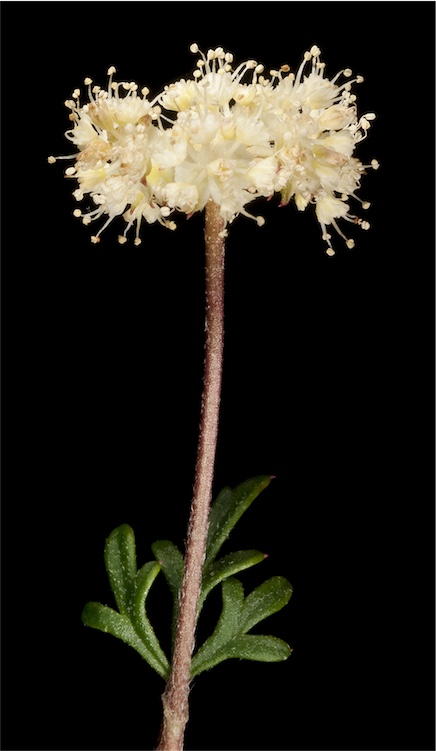
Habit

Xanthosia kochii is a species of erect, perennial shrub in the family Apiaceae and is endemic to the south-west of Western Australia. It has trifoliate leaves with wedge-shaped leaflets, white flowers in a compound umbel with 6 to 15 flowers per ray and up to 6 flowers between the rays.

== Description ==
Xanthosia kochii is an erect, perennial shrub that typically grows to a height of 0.3–1.0 m (1 ft 0 in – 3 ft 3 in) and is hairy. Its leaves are trifoliate, the leaflets wedge-shaped, 3–20 mm (0.12–0.79 in) long and 1–6 mm (0.039–0.236 in) wide on a petiole 2–4 mm (0.079–0.157 in) long and sheathing the stem. The flowers are arranged in a compound umbel with 3 to 5 rays and 6 to 15 flowers per ray and 6 flowers between the rays. The flowers are all female or bisexual and male. There are 3 to 5 linear leaf-like involucral bracts 2–6 mm (0.079–0.236 in) long at the base of the peduncles and 2 or 3 egg-shaped bracts at the base of the flowers. The sepals are narrowly elliptic to egg-shaped, 1.0–1.5 mm (0.039–0.059 in) long and about 0.8 mm (0.031 in) wide. The petals are white, about 1.1 mm (0.043 in) long and about 0.7 mm (0.028 in) wide. Flowering occurs from August to September.

== Taxonomy and naming ==
This species was first formally described in 1911 by Ernst Georg Pritzel, who gave it the name Trachymene kochii in Repertorium Specierum Novarum Regni Vegetabilis, from specimens collected near Watheroo by Max Koch in 1905. In 2013, J.M.Hart and Murray Henwood transferred the species to Xanthosia as X. kochii in the journal Telopea. The specific epithet (kochii) honours the collector of the type specimen.

== Distribution and habitat ==
This species of xanthosia grows under thickets of species of Allocasuarina, Melaleuca and Acacia between Jibberding, Tardun, Mount Gibson and Yandanooka in the Avon Wheatbelt, Geraldton Sandplains, and Yalgoo bioregions of south-western Western Australia and is listed as "not threatened" by the Western Australian Government Department of Biodiversity, Conservation and Attractions.
