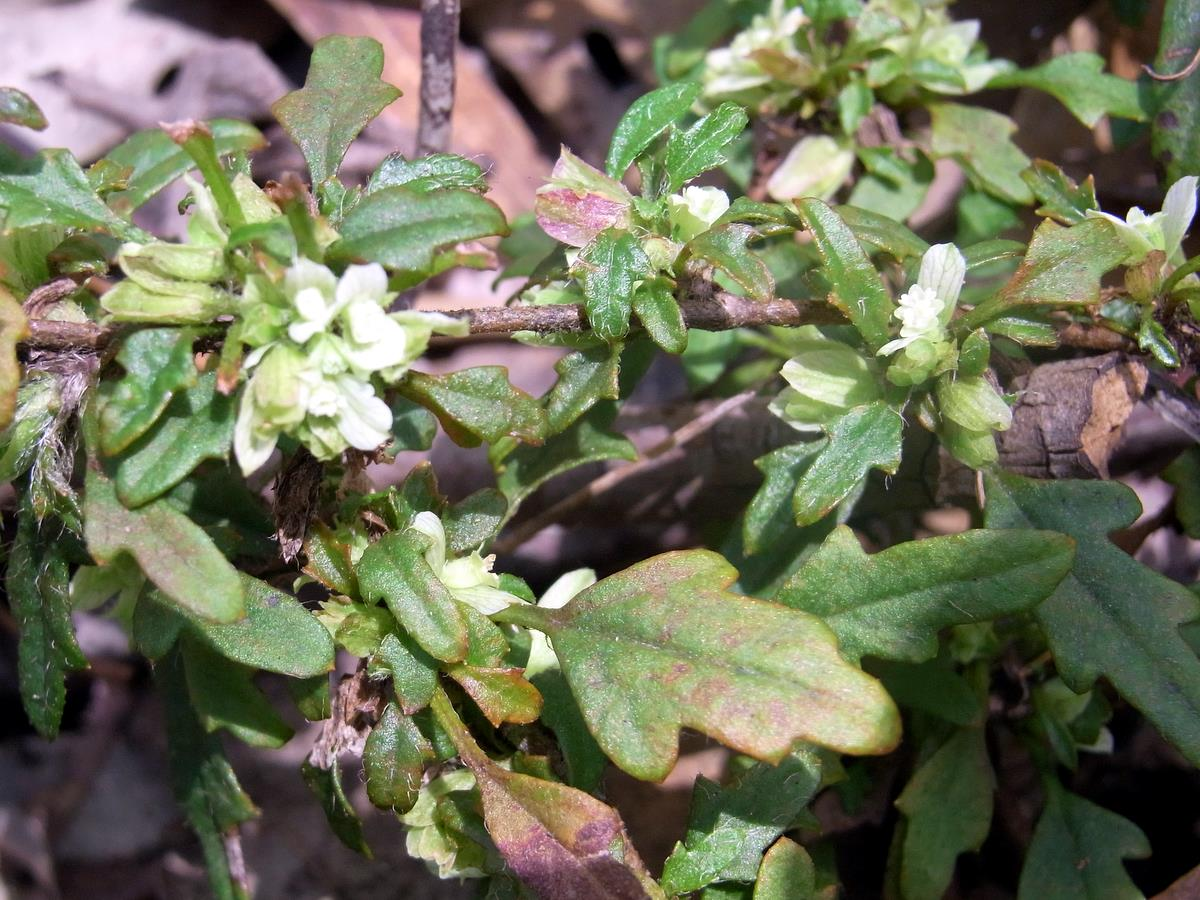
- Xanthosia pilosa at Chatswood West

Scientific classification
- Kingdom: Plantae
- Clade: Tracheophytes
- Clade: Angiosperms
- Clade: Eudicots
- Clade: Asterids
- Order: Apiales
- Family: Apiaceae
- Genus: Xanthosia
- Species: X. pilosa

Binomial name
- Xanthosia pilosa Rudge

Synonyms
- List: Leucolaena pannosa Benth.; Leucolaena pilosa (Rudge) Benth.; Xanthosia diffusa C.T.White; Xanthosia hirsuta DC.; Xanthosia montana Sieber ex Spreng.; Xanthosia montana Sieber ex DC. isonym; Xanthosia pannosa (Benth.) Steud.; Xanthosia pilosa f. 'A'; Xanthosia pilosa f. 'B'; Xanthosia pilosa f. 'C'; Xanthosia pilosa var. glabra C.Moore; Xanthosia pilosa var. longipes Domin; Xanthosia pilosa var. montana (Sieber ex Spreng.) Domin; Xanthosia pilosa var. pannosa (Benth.) Domin; Xanthosia pilosa Rudge var. pilosa; Xanthosia vestita Benth.

= Xanthosia pilosa =

Woolly xanthosia

Species of flowering plant

Xanthosia pilosa, commonly known as woolly xanthosia, is a species of flowering plant in the family Apiaceae and is endemic to south-eastern Australia. It is an erect to open shrub with variably shaped leaves and compound umbels of up to 20 pale green to creamy-white flowers

== Description ==
Xanthosia pilosa ia an erect to open shrub that typically grows to a height of 30–65 cm (12–26 in), its stems sometimes covered with fine, soft hairs. Its leaves are variably shaped, often elliptic to broadly egg-shaped, 4–55 mm (0.16–2.17 in) long and 5–55 mm (0.20–2.17 in) wide, sometimes with 3 to 7 lobes, the centre lobe longer than the side lobes. The upper surface of the leaves is dark green, the lower surface whitish and often with brownish, matted, woolly hairs. The flowers are arranged in compound umbels with up to 20 flowers with petal-like, yellowish-green bracteoles that turn reddish as they age. The sepals are 1.0–1.5 mm (0.039–0.059 in) long and the petals are pale green to creamy-white, 1.0–1.4 mm (0.039–0.055 in) long. Flowering mainly occurs from September to March and the fruit is 2.0–2.9 mm (0.079–0.114 in) long with 7 to 9 mericarps.

== Taxonomy ==
Xanthosia pilosa was first formally described in 1811 by Edward Rudge in Transactions of the Linnean Society of London from specimens collected near Port Jackson. The specific epithet pilosa comes from the Latin, meaning "softly hairy".

== Distribution and habitat ==
Woolly xanthosia grows in heath, woodland and forest in Queensland, New South Wales, Victoria and Tasmania.
