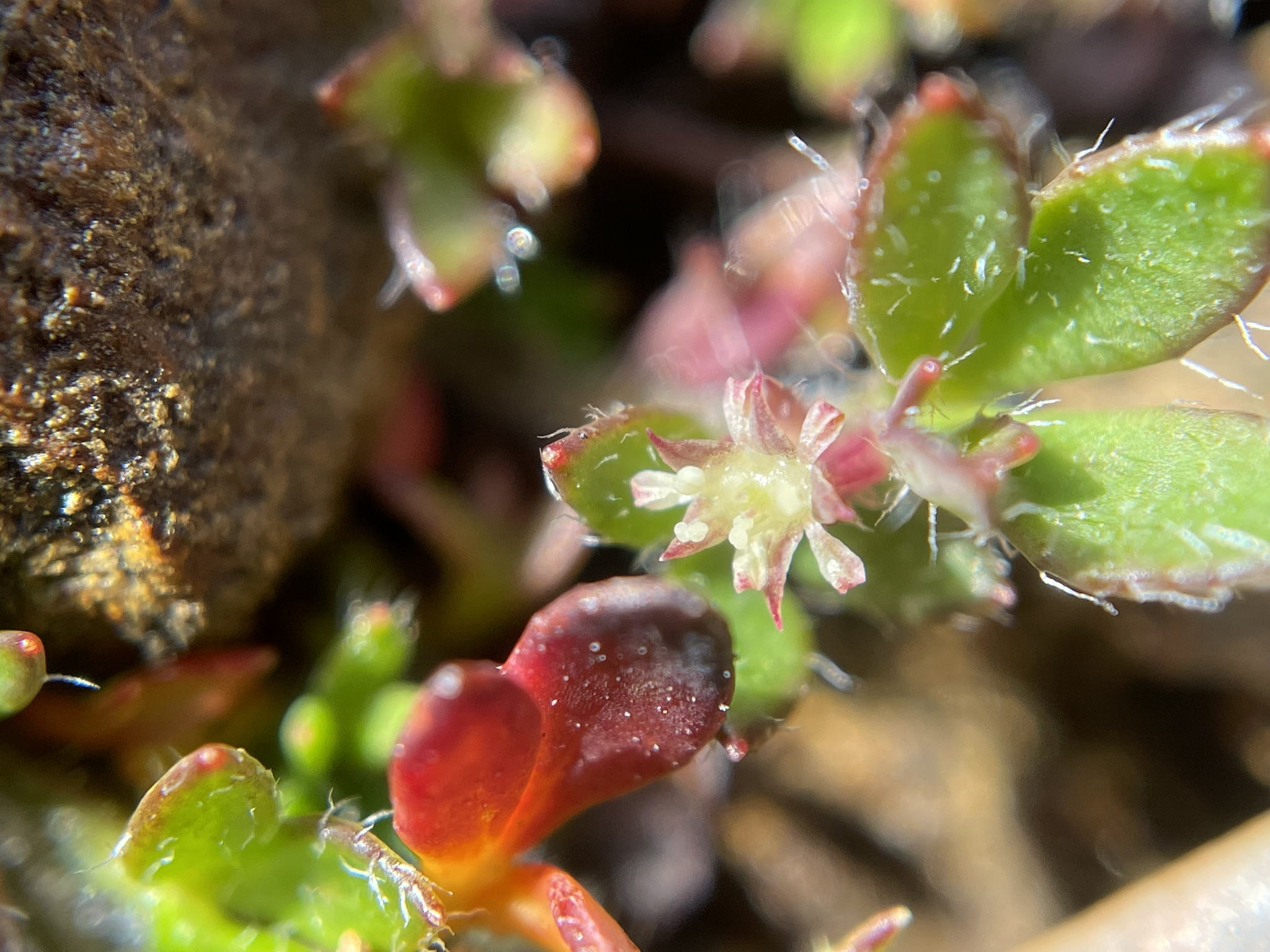
- Near the Savage River, Tasmania

Scientific classification
- Kingdom: Plantae
- Clade: Tracheophytes
- Clade: Angiosperms
- Clade: Eudicots
- Clade: Asterids
- Order: Apiales
- Family: Apiaceae
- Genus: Xanthosia
- Species: X. tasmanica

Binomial name
- Xanthosia tasmanica Domin

= Xanthosia tasmanica =

Species of flowering plant

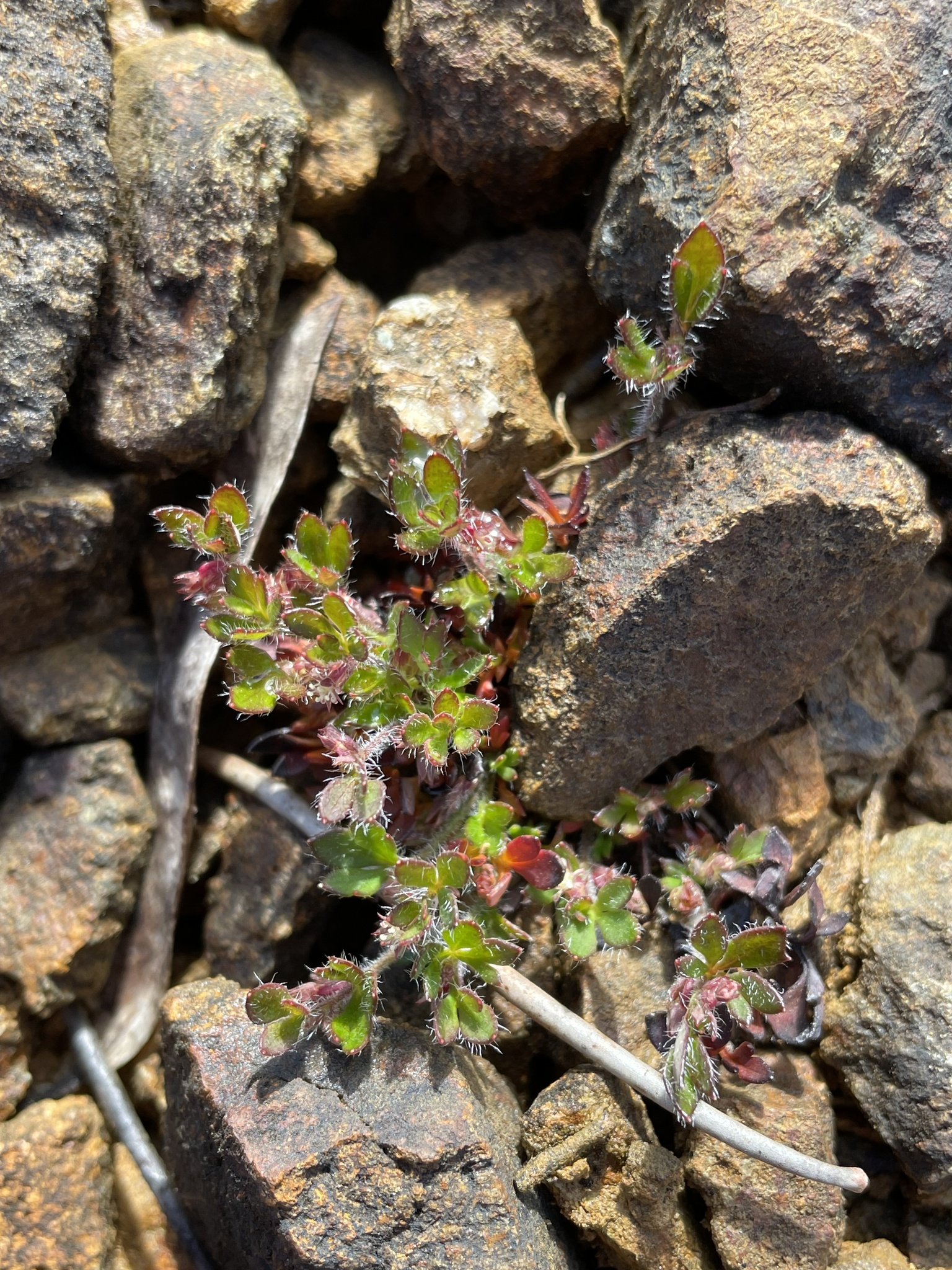
Habit

Xanthosia tasmanica is a species of flowering plant in the family Apiaceae and is endemic to southern Australia. It is an erect or ascending perennial herb with trifoliate leaves with elliptic leaflets, and white flowers in a compound umbel with one flower per ray and sometimes another flower between the rays.

== Description ==
Xanthosia tasmanica is an erect or ascending perennial herb that typically grows to a height of 20 cm (7.9 in) and has a few long spreading hairs on its stems and leaves. Its leaves are trifoliate, the leaflets elliptic or wedge-shaped, 4–15 mm (0.16–0.59 in) long and 3–8 mm (0.12–0.31 in) wide on a petiole up to 30 mm (1.2 in) long. The flowers are arranged in a compound umbel with up to 4 rays with one flower per ray and sometimes one flower between the rays. There are up to four linear, leaf-like bracts 3–4 mm (0.12–0.16 in) long at the base of the flowers and leaf-like green bracteoles 3–4 mm (0.12–0.16 in) long at the base of the peduncles. The sepals are green, 2.0–2.5 mm (0.079–0.098 in) long and the petals are white, shorter than the sepals, about 1.2 mm (0.047 in) long. Flowering occurs in most months with a peak in spring.

== Taxonomy and naming ==
Xanthosia tasmanica was first formally described in 1907 by Karel Domin in Repertorium Specierum Novarum Regni Vegetabilis, from specimens collected between George Town and Circular Head.

== Distribution and habitat ==
This species of xanthosia grows in coastal heath or forest from the south coast of New South Wales, southern Victoria, the Fleurieu Peninsula and Kangaroo Island of South Australia, the Esperance Plains, Jarrah Forest, Swan Coastal Plain and Warren bioregions of south-western Western Australia and Tasmania.
