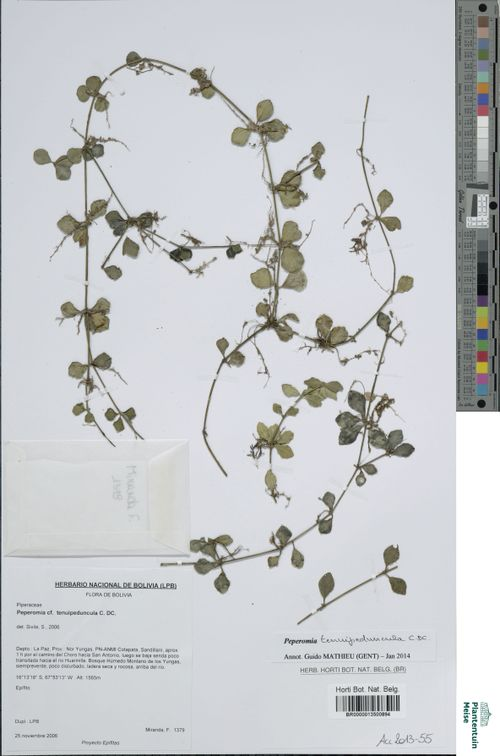

Scientific classification
- Kingdom: Plantae
- Clade: Tracheophytes
- Clade: Angiosperms
- Clade: Magnoliids
- Order: Piperales
- Family: Piperaceae
- Genus: Peperomia
- Species: P. tenuipeduncula

Binomial name
- Peperomia tenuipeduncula C.DC.

= Peperomia tenuipeduncula =

Species of epiphyte

Peperomia trianae is a species of epiphyte in the genus Peperomia. Its Conservation Status is Not Threatened.

== Description ==
The first specimens where collected at 750 metres elevation on Antahuacana.

Peperomia tenuipeduncula is filiform clusters adorn the stem and branches of the ternis-quaternae plant; the leaves are shortly petiolate, with a limb from the base that is acute, elliptic-obovate tip rounded or at least obtuse, and three veins; the petiole is densely hairy, while the above is glabrous. The terminal peduncle is hairy, exceeding the petiole multiple times, followed by a glabrous spike several times beyond the filiform densiflora leaf; the bracts are pelta, elliptic crenulate above the pedicellate centre, the anthers are tiny, the ovary emerges ovate-oblong, and the summon tip is stigmatiferous, while the stigma is glabrous.

It is a creeper plant. internodes 2.5 cm long, stem 0.5 mm thick. spiky branches around 20 centimetres long with a spicy tip. Dry membranous punctulate limbs measure 2.5 centimetres in length. Bracts are 0.5 millimetres long, flowering spikes are around 7 centimetres long, and they are 0.5 millimetres thick.

== Taxonomy and naming ==
It was described in 1914 by Casimir de Candolle in "Repertorium Specierum Novarum Regni Vegetabilis.", from collected specimens by Otto August Buchtien in 1909. It gets its name from Tenui + peduncula, which means Thin stalk.

== Distribution and habitat ==
It is endemic to Bolivia. It grows on epiphyte environment and is a vine.
