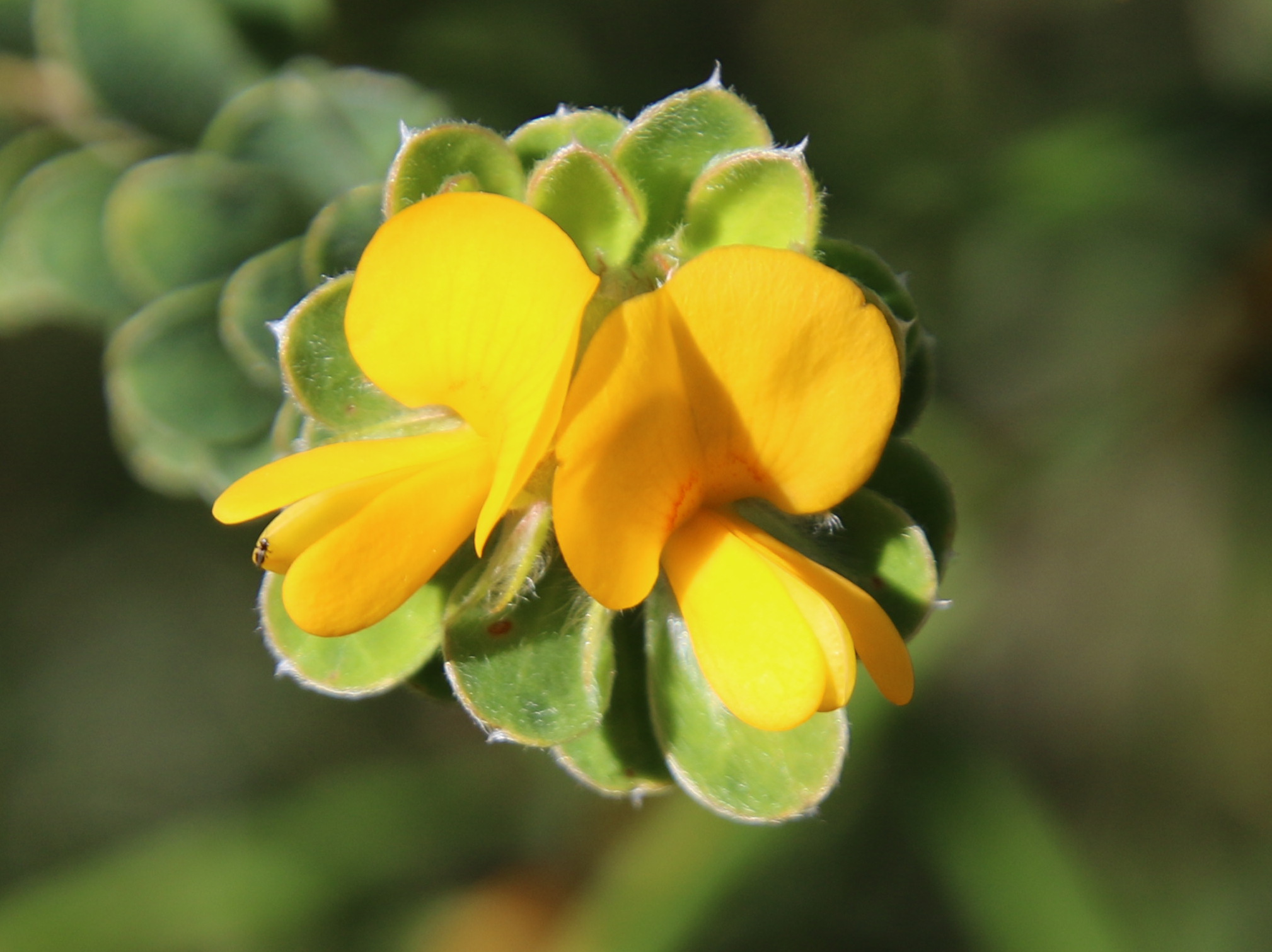
- Pultenaea ferruginea on Barrenjoey Headland

Scientific classification
- Kingdom: Plantae
- Clade: Tracheophytes
- Clade: Angiosperms
- Clade: Eudicots
- Clade: Rosids
- Order: Fabales
- Family: Fabaceae
- Subfamily: Faboideae
- Genus: Pultenaea
- Species: P. ferruginea

Binomial name
- Pultenaea ferruginea Rudge

= Pultenaea ferruginea =

Large bronze bush-pea

Species of flowering plant

Pultenaea ferruginea, commonly known as large bronze bush-pea, is a species of flowering plant in the family Fabaceae and is endemic to eastern Australia. It is an erect shrub with hairy stems, narrow egg-shaped leaves with the narrower end towards the base, and yellow to reddish-orange flowers with reddish-brown markings.

== Description ==
Pultenaea ferruginea is an erect shrub that typically grows to a height of up to 2 m (6 ft 7 in) and has densely hairy stems. The leaves are narrow egg-shaped leaves with the narrower end towards the base, 3–15 mm (0.12–0.59 in) long and 2–7 mm (0.079–0.276 in) wide with the edges curved inwards and with stipules 2–6 mm (0.079–0.236 in) long at the base. The flowers are arranged near the ends of branchlets and are 10–15 mm (0.39–0.59 in) long on pedicels 1–2.5 mm (0.039–0.098 in) long with narrow egg-shaped bracteoles 4–7 mm (0.16–0.28 in) long attached near the middle of the sepal tube. The sepals are 7–12 mm (0.28–0.47 in) long and the petals are yellow to reddish-orange sometimes with reddish-brown markings. The ovary is partly hairy and the fruit is a pod about 6 mm (0.24 in) long.

== Taxonomy and naming ==
Pultenaea ferruginea was first formally described in 1816 by Edward Rudge in Transactions of the Linnean Society of London. The specific epithet (ferruginea) means "rust-coloured".

== Distribution and habitat ==
Large bronze bush-pea grows in forest, woodland and heath on the coast and ranges of New South Wales from the Central Coast to Tathra.
