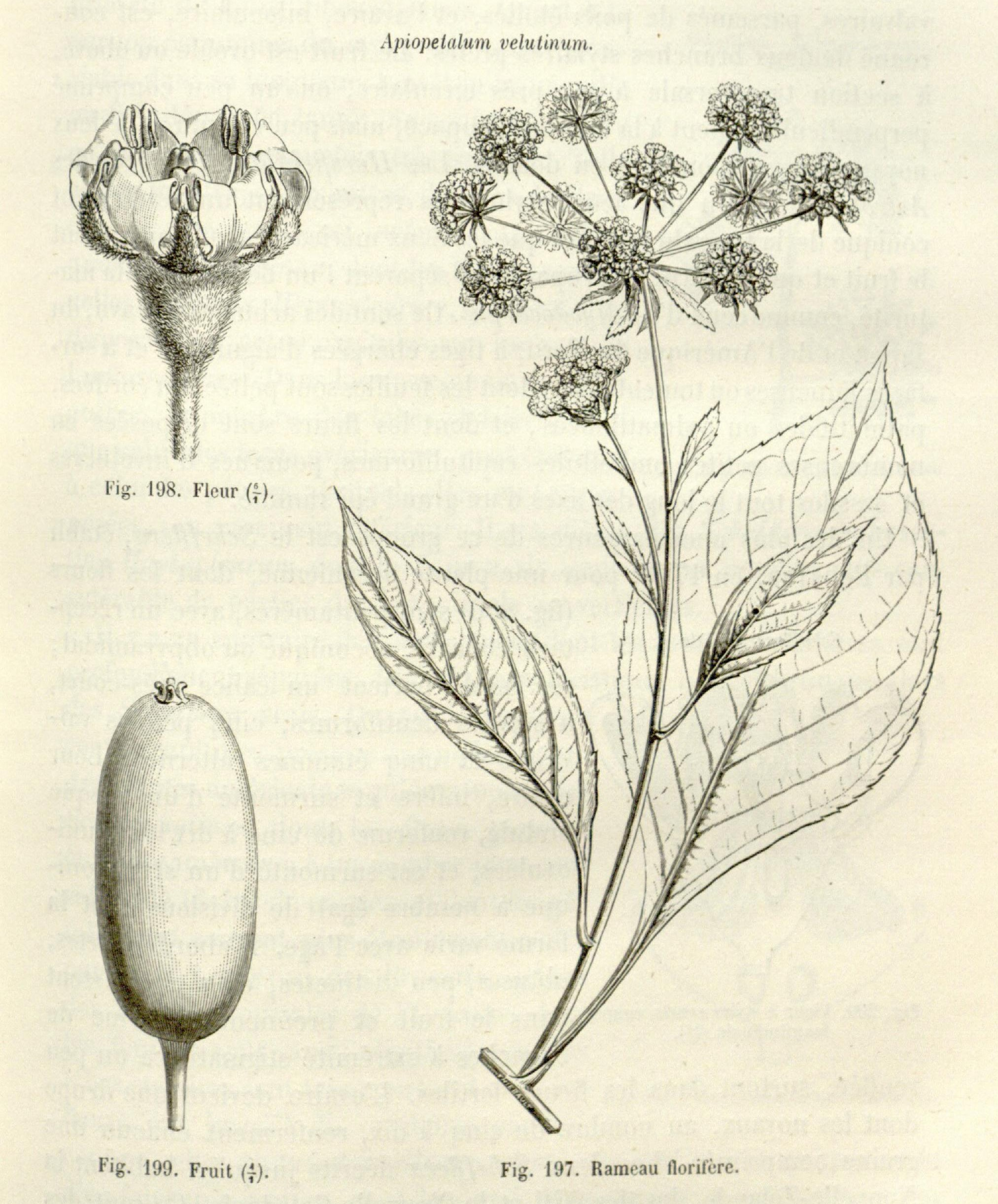

Conservation status
- Conservation Dependent (IUCN 2.3)

Scientific classification
- Kingdom: Plantae
- Clade: Tracheophytes
- Clade: Angiosperms
- Clade: Eudicots
- Clade: Asterids
- Order: Apiales
- Family: Apiaceae
- Genus: Apiopetalum
- Species: A. velutinum

Binomial name
- Apiopetalum velutinum Baill.

= Apiopetalum velutinum =

Species of flowering plant

Apiopetalum velutinum is a species of plant in the family Apiaceae. It is endemic to New Caledonia.
