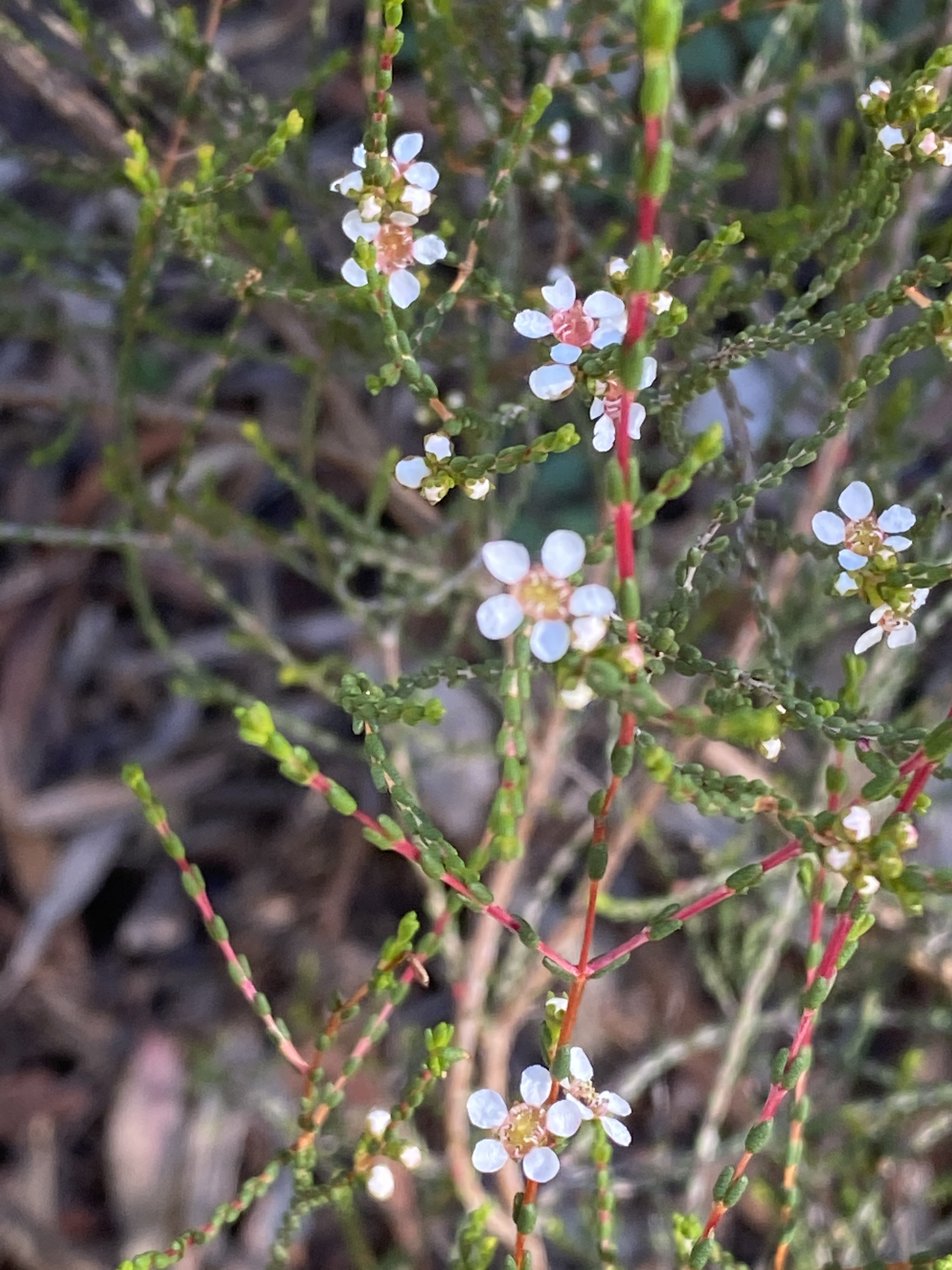

Scientific classification
- Kingdom: Plantae
- Clade: Tracheophytes
- Clade: Angiosperms
- Clade: Eudicots
- Clade: Rosids
- Order: Myrtales
- Family: Myrtaceae
- Genus: Baeckea
- Species: B. brevifolia

Binomial name
- Baeckea brevifolia (Rudge) DC.

Synonyms
- Leptospermum brevifolium Rudge

= Baeckea brevifolia =

Species of flowering plant

Baeckea brevifolia is a species of flowering plant in the family Myrtaceae and is endemic to south-eastern New South Wales. It is a shrub with narrow egg-shaped to oblong leaves and white to pink flowers with nine to fifteen stamens.

== Description ==
Baeckea brevifolia is a shrub that typically grows to a height of up to 1 m (3 ft 3 in). The leaves are elliptic to narrowly oblong, triangular in cross-section, 1.0–2.3 mm (0.039–0.091 in) long, 0.7–1.0 mm (0.028–0.039 in) wide and sessile. The flowers are up to 7.5 mm (0.30 in) wide and arranged singly in leaf axils on a pedicel 0.5–2.5 mm (0.020–0.098 in) long with bracteoles 1.0–1.5 mm (0.039–0.059 in) long. The five sepals are reddish and lobed, the lobes 0.5–1.2 mm (0.020–0.047 in) long. The five petals are white to pale pink and 1.9–2.5 mm (0.075–0.098 in) long, there are usually nine to fifteen stamens and the style is about 1.0 mm (0.039 in) long. Flowering mainly occurs from July to September and the fruit is 1.7–2.0 mm (0.067–0.079 in) in diameter.

== Taxonomy ==
The species was first formally described in 1807 by Edward Rudge who gave it the name Leptospermum brevifolium in Transactions of the Linnean Society of London. In 1828, Augustin Pyramus de Candolle changed the name to Baeckea brevifolia in his Prodromus Systematis Naturalis Regni Vegetabilis. The specific epithet (brevifolia) means "short-leaved".

== Distribution and habitat ==
This baeckea is a common heathland shrub that mainly grows on sandstone soils on the coast and nearby ranges of New South Wales between Woy Woy and Milton.
