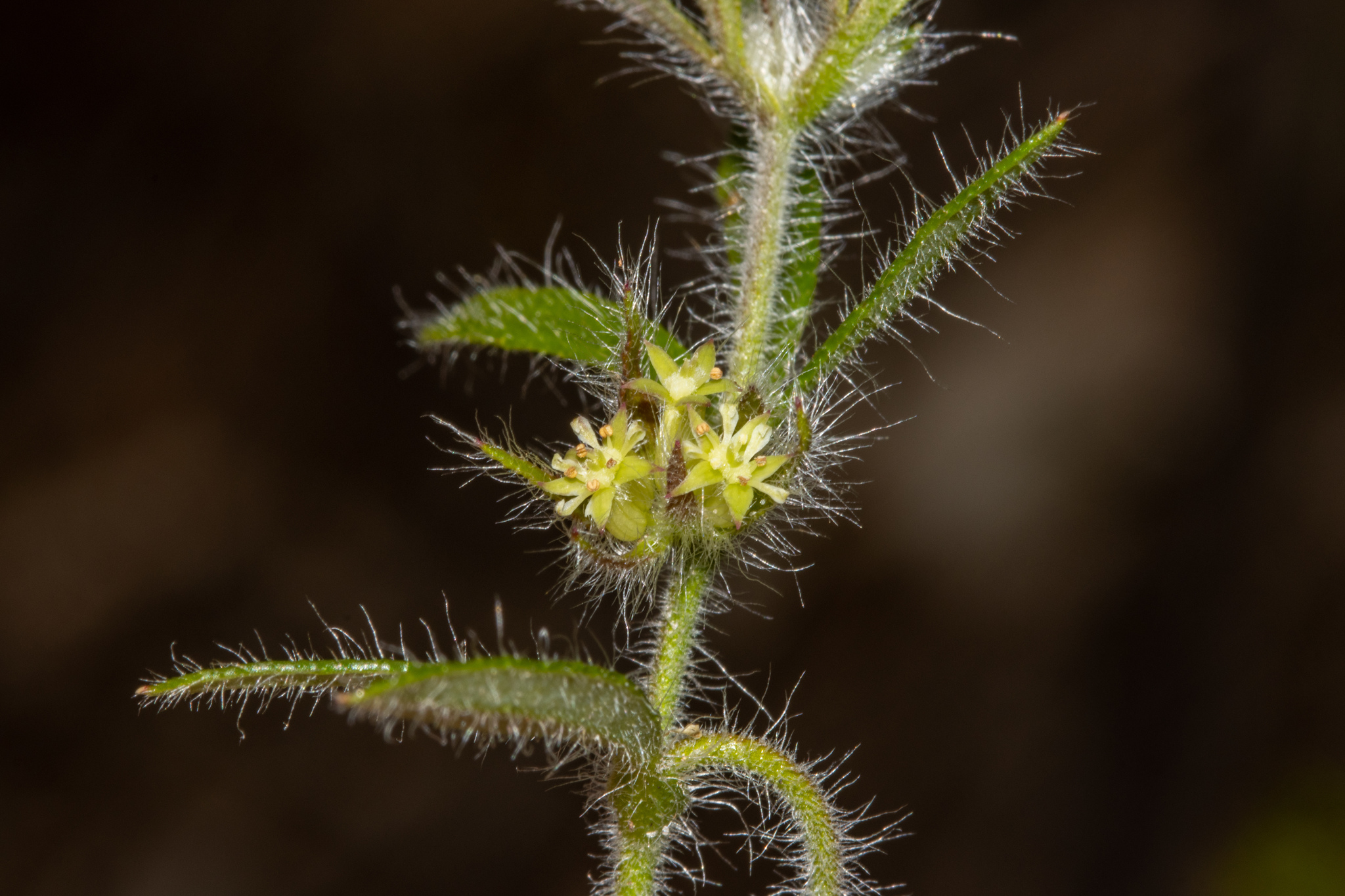
- In Kyeema Conservation Park

Scientific classification
- Kingdom: Plantae
- Clade: Tracheophytes
- Clade: Angiosperms
- Clade: Eudicots
- Clade: Asterids
- Order: Apiales
- Family: Apiaceae
- Genus: Xanthosia
- Species: X. huegelii

Binomial name
- Xanthosia huegelii (Benth.) Steud.

Synonyms
- Leucolaena huegelii Benth.; Xanthosia glabrata Bunge; Xanthosia huegelii subsp. aurea Paczk. & A.R.Chapm. nom. inval.; Xanthosia pusilla Bunge; Xanthosia pusilla var. glabrata (Bunge) Benth.; Xanthosia pusilla Bunge var. pusilla; Xanthosia villosa Turcz.

= Xanthosia huegelii =

Species of flowering plant

Xanthosia huegelii is a weak, low-lying to erect or ascending perennial herb or subshrub in the family Apiaceae and is endemic to southern Australia. It usually has trifoliate leaves and hairy white flowers in umbels of 3 to 6.

== Description ==
Xanthosia huegelii is a weak, low-lying to erect or ascending perennial herb or subshrub that typically grows to a height of up to 15 cm (5.9 in) and has shaggy-hairy branches. Its leaves are usually trifoliate, mostly 6–15 mm (0.24–0.59 in) long and 15–30 mm (0.59–1.18 in) wide on a petiole 6–30 mm (0.24–1.18 in) long. The leaves are sometimes simple or with leaf segments linear to elliptic. The flowers are arranged in a simple umbel with 3 to 6 flowers on a peduncle up to 3 mm (0.12 in) long with linear bracts 4–7 mm (0.16–0.28 in) long at the base. The sepals are about 2 mm (0.079 in) long, the petals white and up to 1.5 mm (0.059 in) long. Flowering occurs in most months and the fuit is 2.5–4 mm (0.098–0.157 in) long with 5 to 9 schizocarps.

== Taxonomy and naming ==
This species was first formally described in 1837 by George Bentham, who gave it the name Leucolaena huegelii in Enumeratio plantarum quas in Novae Hollandiae ora austro-occidentali ad fluvium Cygnorum et in sinu Regis Georgii collegit Carolus Liber Baro de Hügel. In 1841, Ernst Gottlieb von Steudel transferred the species to Xanthosia as X. huegelii in his Nomenclator Botanicus. The specific epithet (huegelii) honours Charles von Hügel.

== Distribution and habitat ==
Xanthosia huegelii grows in near-coastal regions in Western Australia, South Australia and Victoria. In Victoria it grows mainly in heath and woodland and in Western Australia, in winter-wet areas, sandplains and outcrops in the Avon Wheatbelt, Esperance Plains, Geraldton Sandplains, Jarrah Forest, Mallee, Swan Coastal Plain and Warren bioregions of south-western Western Australia.
