= Xanthosia tridentata =

Scientific classification
- Kingdom: Plantae
- Clade: Tracheophytes
- Clade: Angiosperms
- Clade: Eudicots
- Clade: Asterids
- Order: Apiales
- Family: Apiaceae
- Genus: Xanthosia
- Species: X. tridentata

Binomial name
- Xanthosia tridentata A.S.George

Synonyms
- Leucolaena tridentata DC. nom. inval., pro syn.

Species of flowering plant

Xanthosia tridentata, commonly known as rock xanthosia or or hill xanthosia, is a species of flowering plant in the family Apiaceae and is endemic to south-eastern Australia. It is an erect to spreading shrub or subshrub with slender stems, wedge-shaped leaves with a 3-notched tip, and white or pale green to cream-coloured flowers in a compound umbel with 2 to 6 flowers.

== Description ==
Xanthosia tridentata is an erect to spreading shrub or subshrub that typically grows to a height of up to 30 cm (12 in) and has slender branches usually 10–20 cm (3.9–7.9 in) long and young shoots with a few star-shaped hairs. The stem leaves are wedge-shaped, 7–23 mm (0.28–0.91 in) long and 3–15 mm (0.12–0.59 in) wide on a petiole 1–5 mm (0.039–0.197 in) long, with three notches on the end, and the edges curved down. The upper surface of the leaves is more or less glabrous and the lower surface is covered with whitish, woolly hairs. The flowers are borne in umbels of 2 to 6 flowers on a peduncle 2.5–12 mm (0.098–0.472 in) long on the ends of branches or opposite leaf axils. The sepals are shield-shaped, about 1.7 mm (0.067 in) long, and the petals are white to pale green to cream-coloured, about 1.5 mm (0.059 in) long. Flowering occurs from August to April and the fruit is 3.0–3.5 mm (0.12–0.14 in) long.

== Taxonomy ==
Xanthosia tridentata was first described in 1830 by Augustin Pyramus de Candolle in his Prodromus Systematis Naturalis Regni Vegetabilis from specimens collected near Port Jackson. The specific epithet (tridentata) means 'three-toothed'.

== Distribution and habitat ==
This species grows in sandy soils over sandstone and shale in heath, dry scrub and woodland south from Forster and Mount White in New South Wales, the Dandenong-Powelltown area, Wilsons Promontory and East Gippsland areas of Victoria and the east and north-east of Tasmania.
