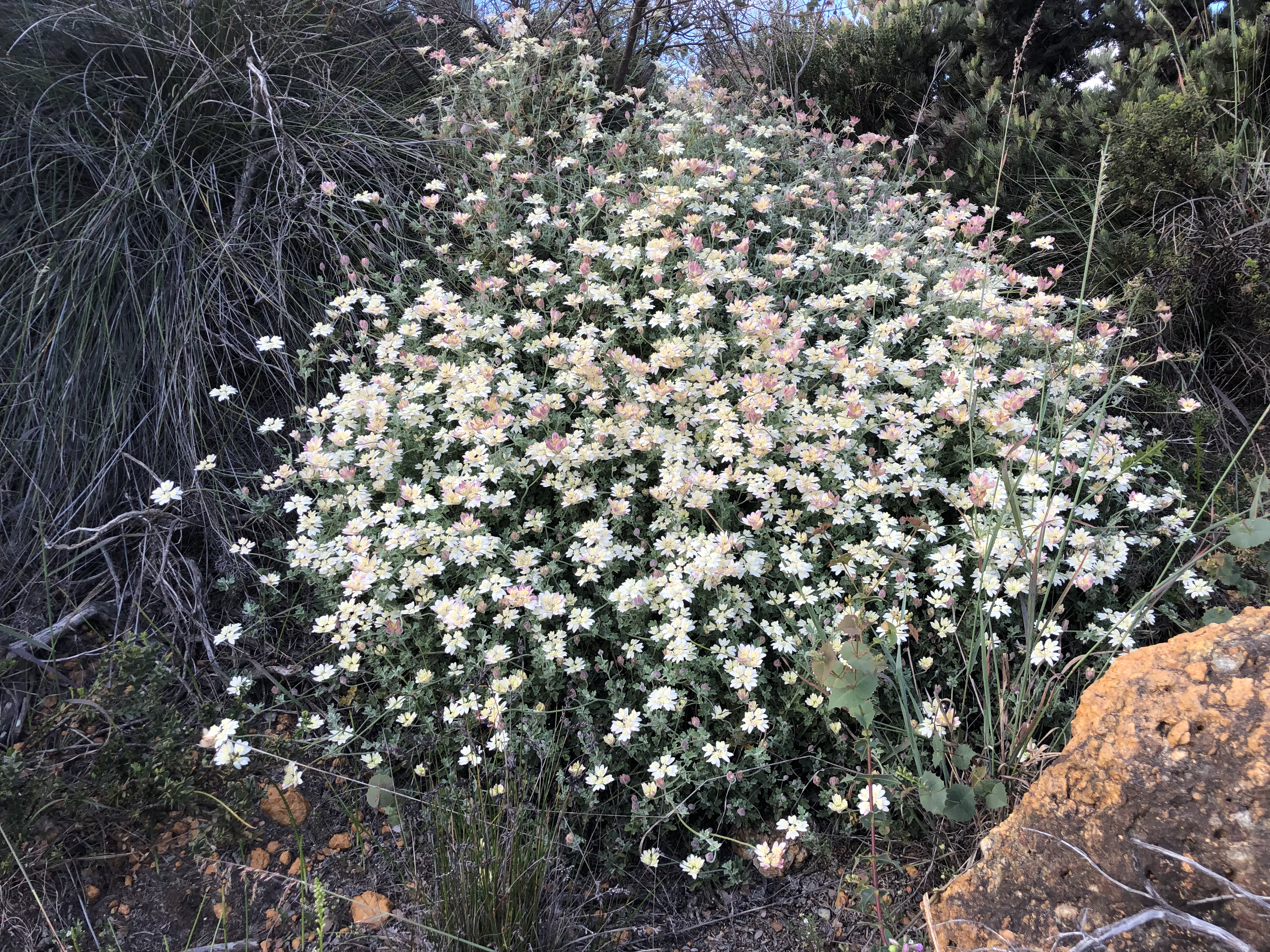

Conservation status
- Priority Four — Rare Taxa (DEC)

Scientific classification
- Kingdom: Plantae
- Clade: Tracheophytes
- Clade: Angiosperms
- Clade: Eudicots
- Clade: Asterids
- Order: Apiales
- Family: Apiaceae
- Genus: Xanthosia
- Species: X. tomentosa

Binomial name
- Xanthosia tomentosa A.S.George

= Xanthosia tomentosa =

Species of flowering plant

Xanthosia tomentosa, common name Lesueur Southern Cross, is a species of flowering plant in the family Apiaceae and is endemic to the southwest of Western Australia. It is a prostrate to ascending perennial herb with many stems, crowded, lobed leaves, and white or cream-coloured to pink flowers in a compound umbel with 5 flowers.

== Description ==
Xanthosia tomentosa is a prostrate to ascending perennial herb with many stems up to 50 cm (20 in) long and covered with woolly, star-shaped hairs when young. The leaves are mainly scattered on side branches, and are 10–30 mm (0.39–1.18 in) long with three to ten lobes. The flowers are borne in umbels of 5 flowers on a peduncle 30–150 mm (1.2–5.9 in) long, each flower on a pedicel 0.75–1.0 mm (0.030–0.039 in) long. The sepals form a tube 2.5 mm (0.098 in) long, and there are three or four carpels less than 1 mm (0.039 in) long and glabrous. The petals are white to cream-coloured or pink and longer than the sepal lobes. Flowering occurs from September to December.

== Taxonomy ==
Xanthosia tomentosa was first described in 1968 by Alex George in the Journal of the Royal Society of Western Australia from specimens he collected in 1966, 2 mi (3.2 km) north of Cockleshell Gully. The specific epithet (tomentosa) means tomentose.

== Distribution and habitat ==
Lesueur Southern Cross grows in lateritic gravelly soils in the Geraldton Sandplains and Swan Coastal Plain bioregions of south-western Western Australia.

== Conservation status ==
Xanthosia tomentosa is listed as "Priority Four" by the Government of Western Australia Department of Biodiversity, Conservation and Attractions, meaning that it is rare or near threatened.
