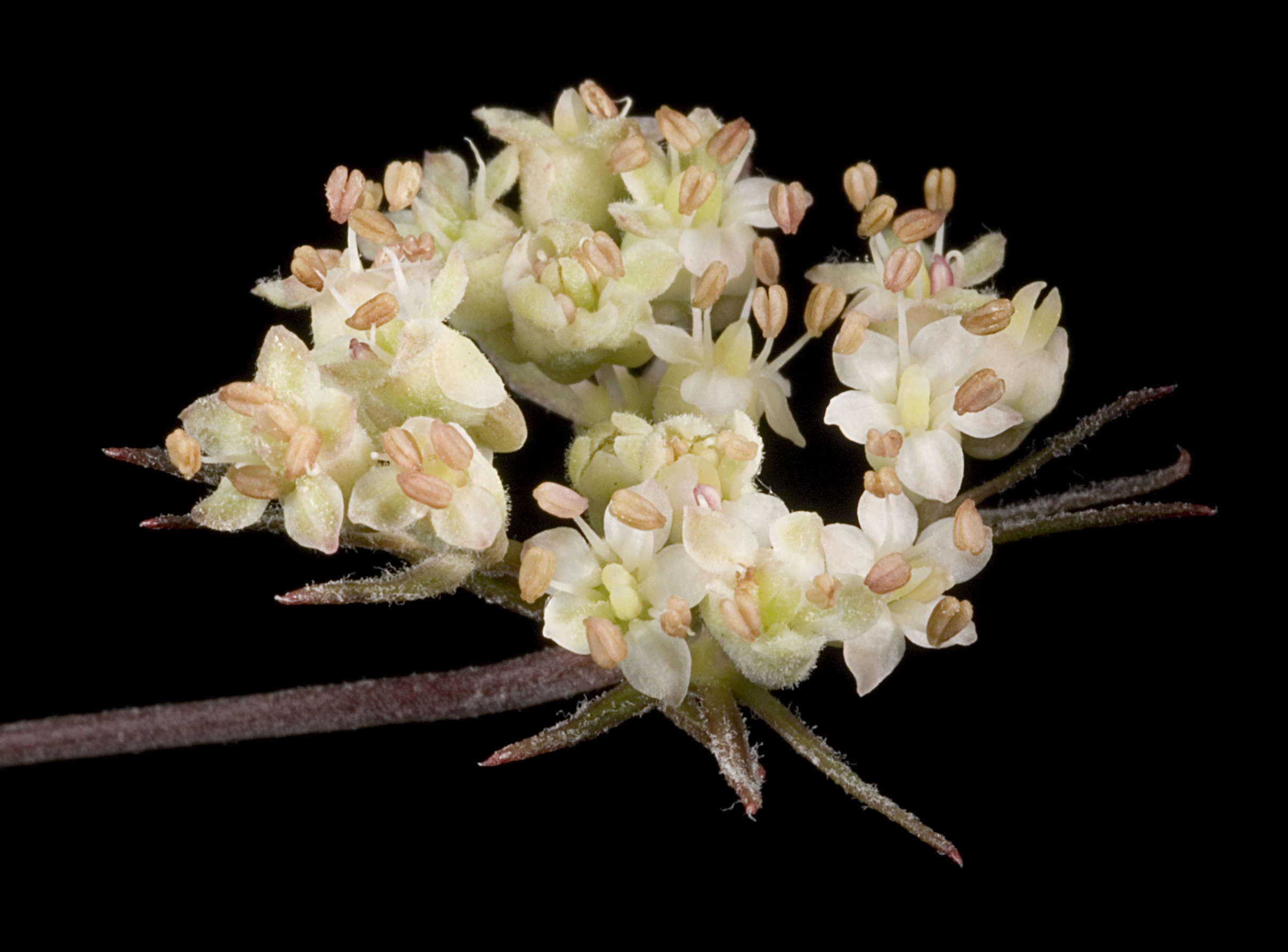
- Pentapeltis peltigera

Scientific classification
- Kingdom: Plantae
- Clade: Embryophytes
- Clade: Tracheophytes
- Clade: Spermatophytes
- Clade: Angiosperms
- Clade: Eudicots
- Clade: Asterids
- Order: Apiales
- Family: Apiaceae
- Subfamily: Mackinlayoideae
- Genus: Pentapeltis; Bunge

= Pentapeltis =

Genus of plants

Pentapeltis is a genus of flowering plants belonging to the family Apiaceae.

Its native range is Southwestern Australia.

== Species ==
Species:

- Pentapeltis peltigera (Hook.) Bunge
- Pentapeltis silvatica (Diels) Domin
