= Xanthosia fruticulosa =

Scientific classification
- Kingdom: Plantae
- Clade: Tracheophytes
- Clade: Angiosperms
- Clade: Eudicots
- Clade: Asterids
- Order: Apiales
- Family: Apiaceae
- Genus: Xanthosia
- Species: X. fruticulosa

Binomial name
- Xanthosia fruticulosa Benth.

Species of flowering plant

Xanthosia fruticulosa is an erect, perennial subshrub in the family Apiaceae and is endemic to the south-west of Western Australia. It has trifoliate leaves at the base of the plants and 16 to 40 white or pink flowers in an umbel with all bisexual, or bisexual and male flowers.

== Description ==
Xanthosia fruticulosa is an erect, perennial subshrub that typically grows to a height of 20 cm (7.9 in) and is sparsely hairy. Its leaves are trifoliate, arranged at the base of the plant, the leaflets wedge-shaped, 5–22 mm (0.20–0.87 in) long and 1.5–8 mm (0.059–0.315 in) wide on a petiole 1–6 mm (0.039–0.236 in) long and sheathing the stem. The flowers are arranged in a simple umbel with 16 to 40 bisexual or bisexual and male flowers. There are 5 to 8 involucral bracts at the base of the peduncles. The sepals are green, lance-shaped, 1.7–2.7 mm (0.067–0.106 in) long and about 0.8 mm (0.031 in) wide. The petals are white or pink, 0.07–0.9 mm (0.0028–0.0354 in) long and about 0.5 mm (0.020 in) wide. Flowering occurs from September to November.

== Taxonomy and naming ==
Xanthosia fruticulosa was first formally described in 1867 by George Bentham in his Flora Australiensis from specimens collected by James Drummond between the Moore and Murchison Rivers. The specific epithet (fruticulosa) means "bushy".

== Distribution and habitat ==
This species of xanthosia grows in gravelly soils or peaty sand in the Avon Wheatbelt, Geraldton Sandplains, Jarrah Forest and Swan Coastal Plain bioregions of south-western Western Australia and is listed as "not threatened" by the Western Australian Government Department of Biodiversity, Conservation and Attractions.
