= Xanthosia dissecta =

Scientific classification
- Kingdom: Plantae
- Clade: Tracheophytes
- Clade: Angiosperms
- Clade: Eudicots
- Clade: Asterids
- Order: Apiales
- Family: Apiaceae
- Genus: Xanthosia
- Species: X. dissecta

Binomial name
- Xanthosia dissecta (Hook.)

Species of flowering plant

Xanthosia dissecta, commonly known as cut-leaved xanthosia, is a species of flowering plant in the family Apiaceae and is endemic to south-eastern Australia. It is a prostrate, tufted herb with dissected leaves at the base of the plant, and small white or reddish flowers arranged in one or two umbellules, each with up to 3 flowers.

== Description ==
Xanthosia dissecta is a prostrate, tufted herb that typically grows to a height of 10 cm (3.9 in) with much-branched stems and low-lying branches. Its leaves are mostly at the base of the plant, 5–20 mm (0.20–0.79 in) long and 15–25 mm (0.59–0.98 in) wide on a petiole up to 8 mm (0.31 in) long. The leaves are 2 or 3 times dissected, with linear to egg-shaped lobes 1–2 mm (0.039–0.079 in) long. The inflorescence is arranged in leaf axils or on the ends of short branches with up to 3 umbellules with 1 or 2 rays. Each partial umbel is subtended by a linear to narrowly elliptic involucral bract 2–3 mm (0.079–0.118 in) long. The sepals and petals are about 1 mm (0.039 in) long, the petals white or reddish. Flowering occurs in spring or summer.

== Taxonomy and naming ==
Xanthosia dissecta was first formally described in 1840 by Joseph Dalton Hooker in Icones Plantarum from specimens collected by Ronald Campbell Gunn in Tasmania. The specific epithet (dissecta) means "deeply divided".

== Distribution and habitat ==
Xanthosia dissecta grows in wet heath, and heath woodland near streams or swamps south from Lawson, New South Wales and Bulli Pass in New South Wales, in southern Victoria and Tasmania.
