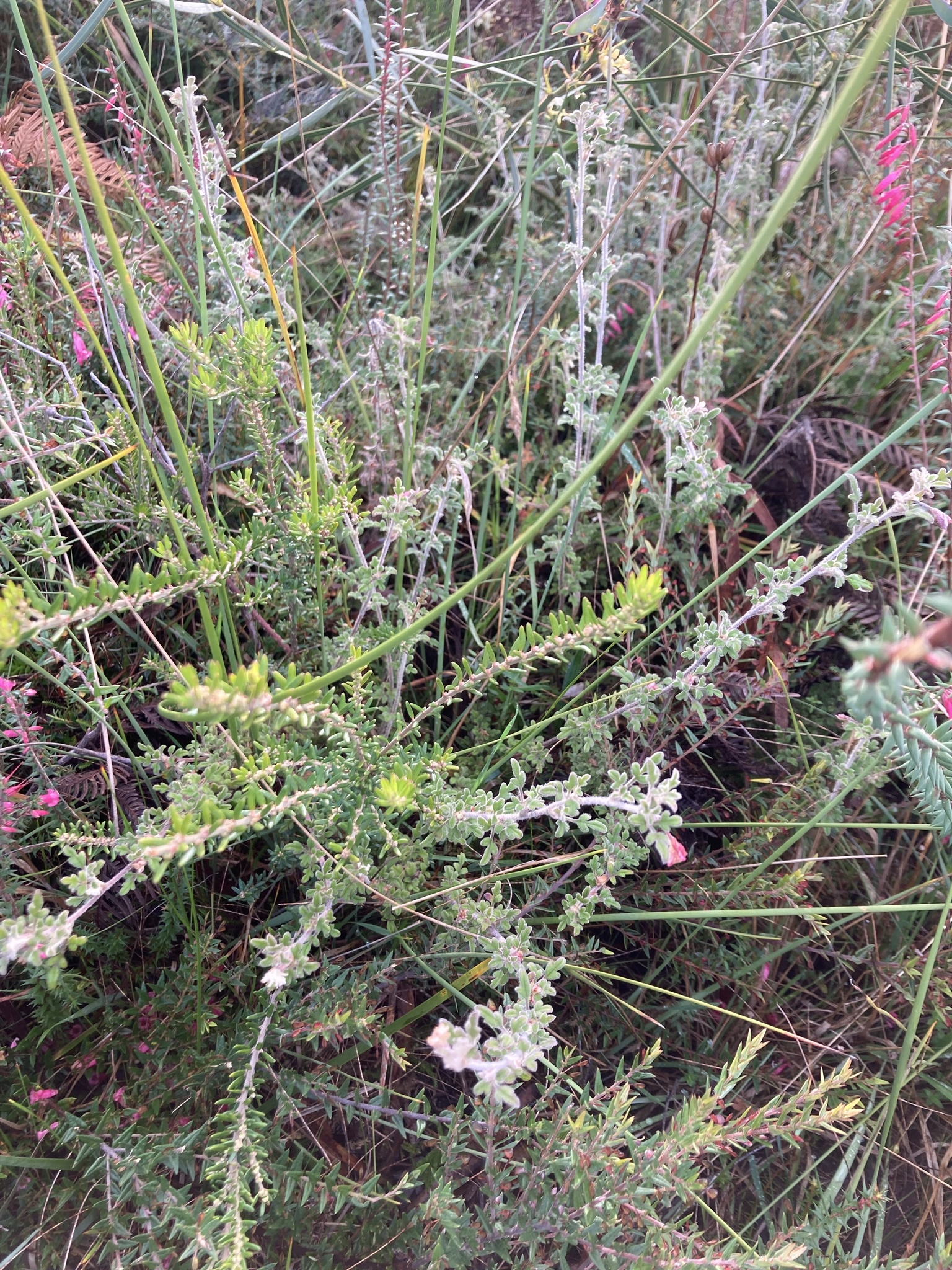

Scientific classification
- Kingdom: Plantae
- Clade: Tracheophytes
- Clade: Angiosperms
- Clade: Eudicots
- Clade: Asterids
- Order: Apiales
- Family: Apiaceae
- Genus: Xanthosia
- Species: X. ternifolia

Binomial name
- Xanthosia ternifolia J.M.Hart & Henwood

= Xanthosia ternifolia =

Species of flowering plant

Xanthosia ternifolia is a species of flowering plant in the family Apiaceae and is native to Tasmania and New South Wales. It is an erect shrub with trifoliate leaves, the segments egg-shaped, and white flowers in a compound umbel up to 4 flowers.

== Description ==
Xanthosia ternifolia is an erect shrub that typically grows to a height of up to 40 cm (16 in), its stems and leaves covered with woolly hairs. Its leaves are trifoliate, the leaflets egg-shaped 7–20 mm (0.28–0.79 in) long and 5–15 mm (0.20–0.59 in) long, the edges with three lobes. The flowers are arranged in a on the ends of branches or in leaf axils in a compound umbel on a peduncle up to 10 mm (0.39 in) long with up to 4 flowers. There are yellow petal-like involucral bracts 3–6 mm (0.12–0.24 in) long at the base of the flowers. The sepals are 1.2–1.5 mm (0.047–0.059 in) long and the petals are white, 1.1–1.3 mm (0.043–0.051 in) long. Flowering occurs from September to December.

== Taxonomy and naming ==
Xanthosia ternifolia was first formally described in 2000 by J.M.Hart and Murray J. Henwood in Australian Systematic Botany. The specific epithet (ternifolia) means "three-leaved".

== Distribution and habitat ==
This species of xanthosia grows in heathland and eucalypt woodland in Tasmania and on the far south coast of New South Wales.
