= Edward John Rudge =

Edward John Rudge DL FRS FSA (30 May 1792 – 29 January 1861) was a British barrister and antiquary.

Rudge was the son of Edward Rudge, botanist and antiquary, and Anne Rudge, botanical illustrator. He was educated in Chiswick and at Westminster School, and was admitted to Gonville and Caius College, Cambridge in 1811, graduating B.A. in 1815 (M.A. 1818). He entered Lincoln's Inn in 1815, and was called to the bar in 1819. He was elected Fellow of the Society of Antiquaries of London in 1834, and of the Royal Society in 1847.

He was the author of Some Account of the History and Antiquities of Evesham (1820) on the town of Evesham, and the Illustrated and Historical Account of Buckden Palace (1839).
