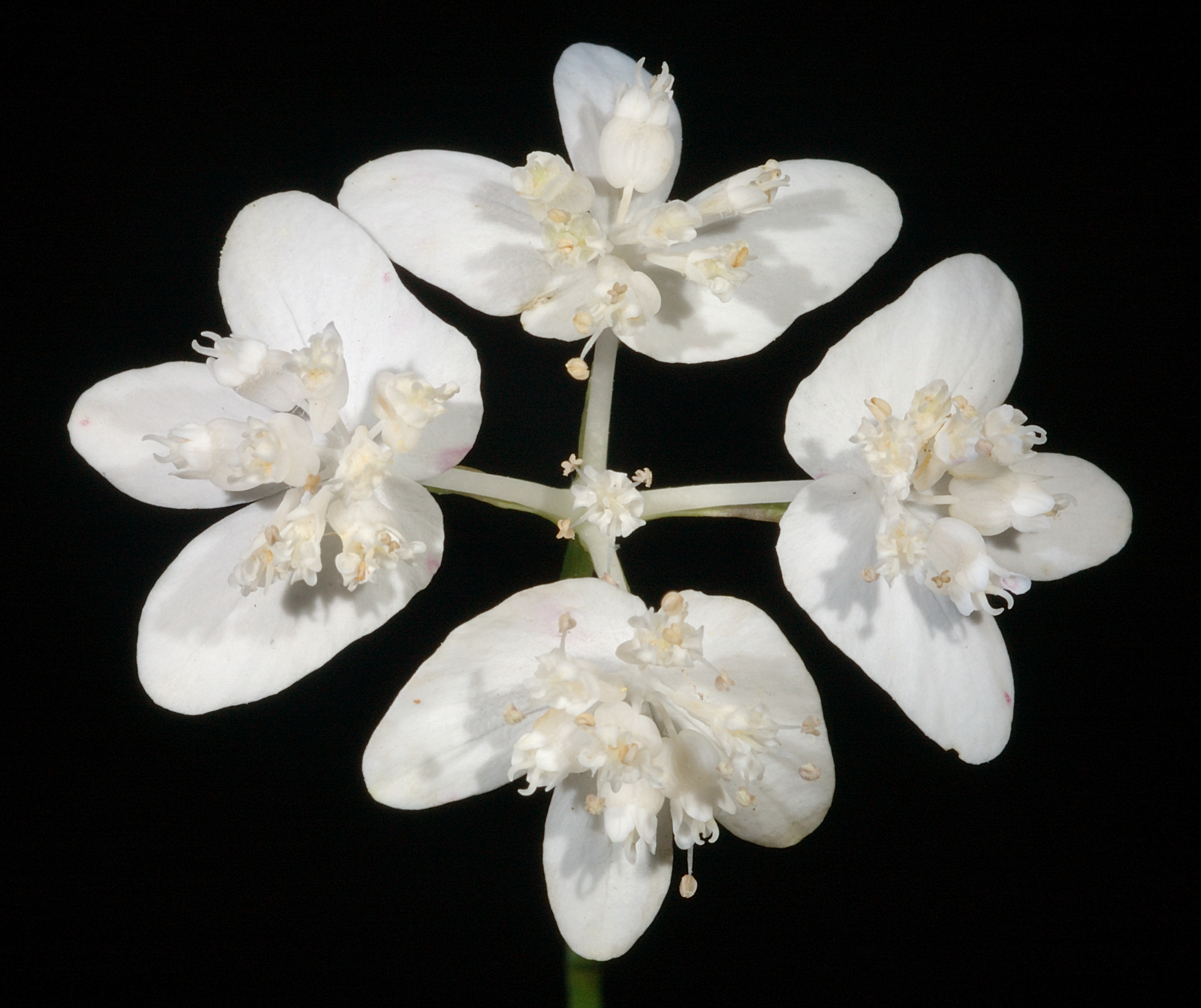

Scientific classification
- Kingdom: Plantae
- Clade: Tracheophytes
- Clade: Angiosperms
- Clade: Eudicots
- Clade: Asterids
- Order: Apiales
- Family: Apiaceae
- Genus: Xanthosia
- Species: X. atkinsoniana

Binomial name
- Xanthosia atkinsoniana F.Muell.

= Xanthosia atkinsoniana =

Species of flowering plant

Xanthosia atkinsoniana, is a small herb in the family Apiaceae. It grows in both New South Wales and Western Australia.

== Description ==
Xanthosia atkinsoniana is an erect, perennial herb growing to 60 cm high. It is sparsely hairy, becoming smooth with age. The flowering stems are almost leafless.

The leaves (on a petiole of length 2–12 cm) mostly occur at the base of the plant, with the leaf-blade being 2–4 cm by 1.5–4 cm. They are dissected in threes with the segments often being divided again, and the lower surfaces have sparse stellate hairs.

The umbels are 16–36-flowered, and on a stout peduncle up to 40 cm long. The white bracteoles are like petals and 3–8 mm long. The sepals are about 1–1.6 mm long, and the white to pinkish petals are about 1.5 mm long, white to pinkish. The disc-like enlargement of the base of the style (the stylopodium) is hairy. The fruits are 1.8–2.7 mm long and split into 9-ribbed mericarps.

In New South Wales it flowers from September to April. In Western Australia, it flowers from October to December, or January to April.

== Taxonomy and naming ==
Xanthosia atkinsonia was described in 1861 by Ferdinand von Mueller. The specific epithet, atkinsoniana, honours Louisa Atkinson who collected the type specimen: "In montibus coeruleis Novae Austro-Cambriae prope amnem Grose stirpem detexerunt L. Atkinson et W. Woolls." (L.Atkinson & W. Woolls detected it near the Grose River in the Blue Mountains of New South Wales). There are no synonyms.
