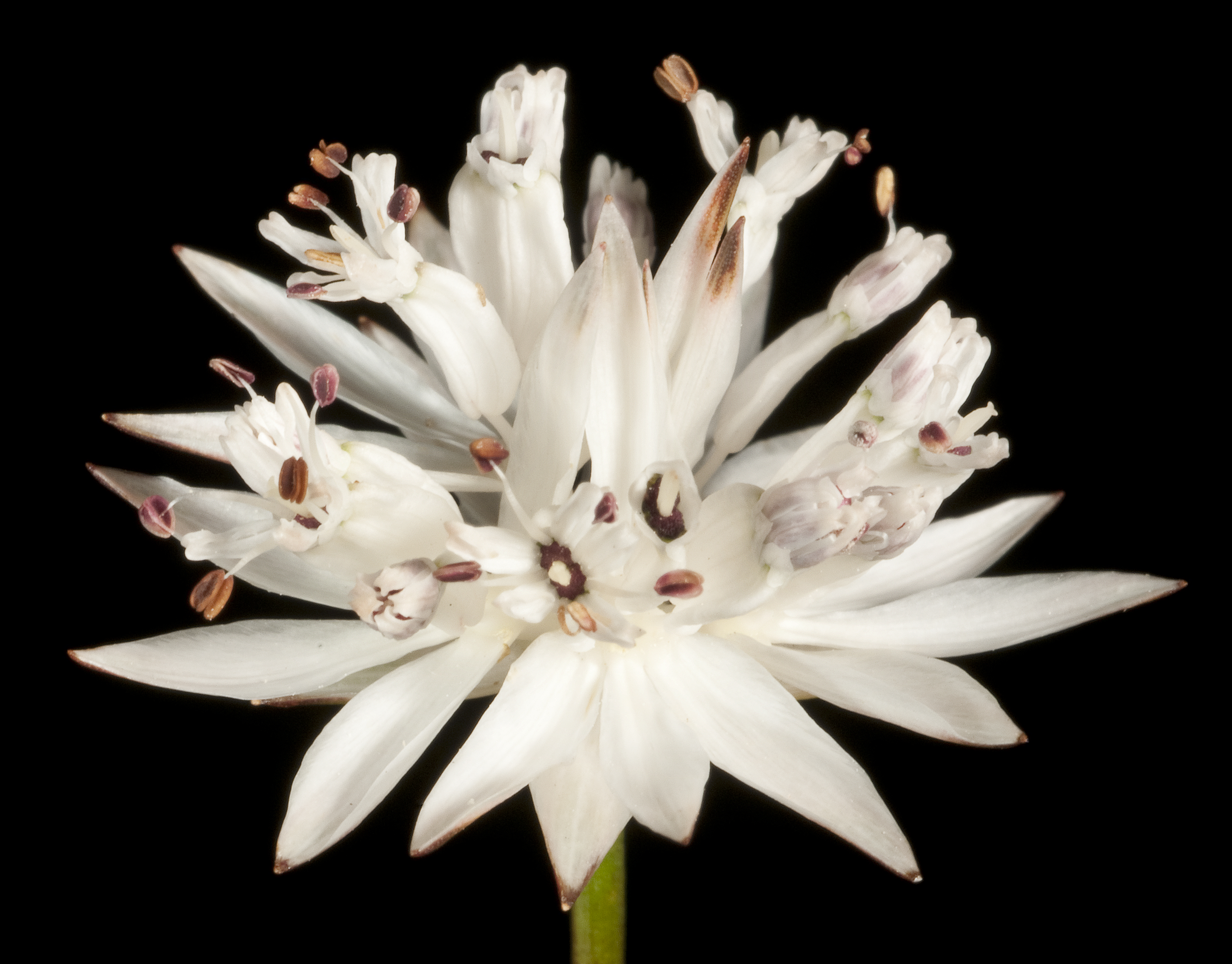
- S. juncea

Scientific classification
- Kingdom: Plantae
- Clade: Tracheophytes
- Clade: Angiosperms
- Clade: Eudicots
- Clade: Asterids
- Order: Apiales
- Family: Apiaceae
- Subfamily: Mackinlayoideae
- Genus: Schoenolaena; Bunge
- Species: S. juncea

Binomial name
- Schoenolaena juncea Bunge

= Schoenolaena =

Genus of plants

Schoenolaena is a monotypic genus of flowering plants belonging to the family Apiaceae. The sole species is Schoenolaena juncea.

Its native range is Southwestern Australia.
