= Xanthosia stellata =

Scientific classification
- Kingdom: Plantae
- Clade: Tracheophytes
- Clade: Angiosperms
- Clade: Eudicots
- Clade: Asterids
- Order: Apiales
- Family: Apiaceae
- Genus: Xanthosia
- Species: X. stellata

Binomial name
- Xanthosia stellata J.M.Hart & Henwood

Species of flowering plant

Xanthosia stellata, commonly known as star xanthosia, is a species of flowering plant in the family Apiaceae and is endemic to eastern Australia. It is an erect subshrub with trifoliate leaves with elliptic leaflets, and white flowers in a compound umbel with up to three flowers per ray.

== Description ==
Xanthosia stellata is an erect or ascending subshrub that typically grows to a height of 20 cm (7.9 in) and has star-shaped hairs on its stems and leaves. Its leaves are trifoliate, the leaflets elliptic or wedge-shaped, 2–12 mm (0.079–0.472 in) long and 2–10 mm (0.079–0.394 in) wide on a petiole 2–10 mm (0.079–0.394 in) long. The flowers are arranged in a compound umbel with 1 to 3 rays on a peduncle up to 12 mm (0.47 in) and up to 3 flowers per ray. There are yellow, later reddish petal-like involucral bracts 4–6 mm (0.16–0.24 in) long at the base of the peduncles. The sepals are 1.3–1.5 mm (0.051–0.059 in) long and the petals are white, 1.1–1.3 mm (0.043–0.051 in) long. Flowering occurs in November and December.

== Taxonomy and naming ==
Xanthosia stellata was first formally described in 2000 by J.M. Hart and Murray J. Henwood in Australian Systematic Botany, from specimens collected by Hart the Blue Mountains National Park in 1996. The specific epithet (stellata) means "starry".

== Distribution and habitat ==
This species of xanthosia grows in forest in the Blue Mountains and Southern Highland of New South Wales, and in Queensland. It is only known from Raymond Creek Falls in the Snowy River National Park in Victoria, where it grows in open shrubland and is listed as "critically endangered" under the Victorian Government Flora and Fauna Guarantee Act 1988.
