= Xanthosia collina =

Scientific classification
- Kingdom: Plantae
- Clade: Tracheophytes
- Clade: Angiosperms
- Clade: Eudicots
- Clade: Asterids
- Order: Apiales
- Family: Apiaceae
- Genus: Xanthosia
- Species: X. collina

Binomial name
- Xanthosia collina Keighery

Species of flowering plant

Xanthosia collina is a species of flowering plant in the family Apiaceae and is endemic to the south of Western Australia. It is a small herbaceous perennial about 6 cm (2.4 in) high with white or pink and white flowers.

Xanthosia collina was first formally described in 1983 by Gregory John Keighery in Botanische Jahrbücher für Systematik, Pflanzengeschichte und Pflanzengeographie from specimens he collected on Mount Trio in the Stirling Range. The specific epithet (collina) means "living on hills".

This species grows in winter-west places, near swamps and on hilltops in the Esperance Plains, bioregion of southern Western Australia and is listed as "Priority Three by the Government of Western Australia Department of Biodiversity, Conservation and Attractions meaning that it is poorly known and known from only a few locations but is not under imminent threat.
