= Micropleura (plant) =

Scientific classification
- Kingdom: Plantae
- Clade: Tracheophytes
- Clade: Angiosperms
- Clade: Eudicots
- Clade: Asterids
- Order: Apiales
- Family: Apiaceae
- Subfamily: Mackinlayoideae
- Genus: Micropleura; Lag.

Genus of plants

Micropleura is a genus of flowering plants belonging to the family Apiaceae.

Its native range is Mexico to Colombia.

== Species ==
Species:

- Micropleura flabellifolia Mathias
- Micropleura renifolia Lag.
