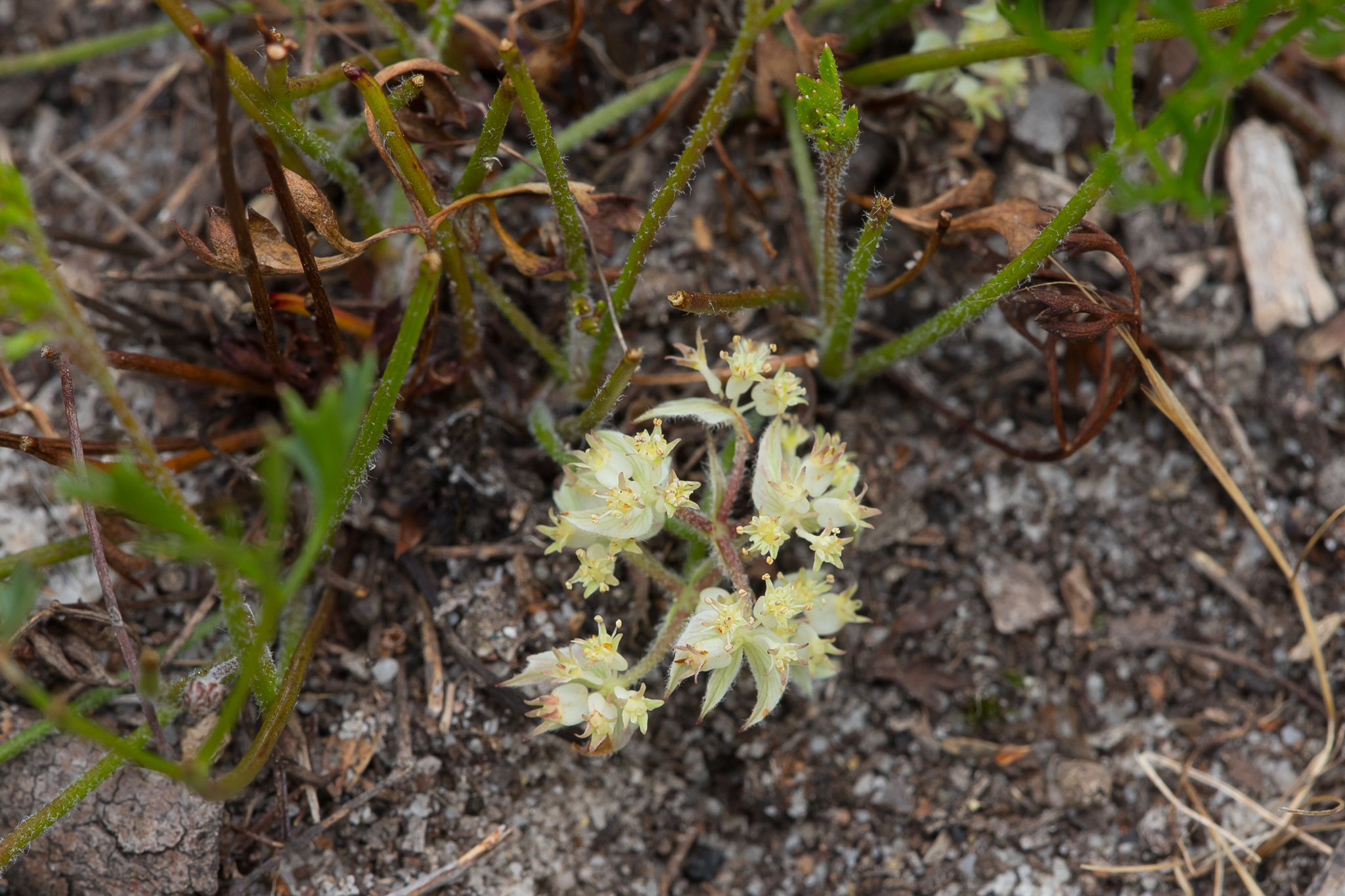
- In Cox Scrub Conservation Park

Scientific classification
- Kingdom: Plantae
- Clade: Tracheophytes
- Clade: Angiosperms
- Clade: Eudicots
- Clade: Asterids
- Order: Apiales
- Family: Apiaceae
- Genus: Xanthosia
- Species: X. leiophylla

Binomial name
- Xanthosia leiophylla F.Muell. ex Klatt

Synonyms
- Xanthosia dissecta var. floribunda Benth.; Xanthosia dissecta auct. non Hook.f.; Xanthosia dissecta auct. non Hook.f.

= Xanthosia leiophylla =

Species of flowering plant

Xanthosia leiophylla is a tufted herb or weak subshrub in the family Apiaceae and is endemic to south-eastern continental Australia. It has bifoliolate or trifoliate leaves and 2 to 4 rays with up to 3 reddish flowers.

== Description ==
Xanthosia leiophylla is a tufted herb or weak subshrub that typically grows to a height of up to 15 cm (5.9 in) and has low-lying or ascending branches. Its leaves are mostly at the base of the plant and are 10–50 mm (0.39–1.97 in) long and wide on a petiole 20–120 mm (0.79–4.72 in) long with bifoliolate or trifoliate leaflets 1.5–3 mm (0.059–0.118 in) long. The flowers are arranged in 2 to 4 rays on a peduncle 10–40 mm (0.39–1.57 in) long, each with up to 6 male or bisexual flowers. There are bracts 3–4 mm (0.12–0.16 in) long at the base of the rays, and bracteoles 3–4.5 mm (0.12–0.18 in) at the base of the flowers up to 3 sessile flowers at the base of the rays. The sepals and petals are reddish and about 1 mm (0.039 in) long. Flowering occurs in spring and summer and the fuit is about 2 mm (0.079 in) long and the schizocarps are finely ribbed.

== Taxonomy and naming ==
Xanthosia leiophylla was first formally described in 1859 by Friedrich Wilhelm Klatt from an unpublished description by Ferdinand von Mueller. Klatt's description was published in Linnaea : Ein Journal für die Botanik in ihrem ganzen Umfange, oder Beiträge zur Pflanzenkunde.

== Distribution and habitat ==
Xanthosia leiophylla grows in sandy or heathy woodland in south-western Victoria and at Wilsons Promontory. It also occurs in South Australia where it is included with Xanthosia dissecta.
