= Xanthosia peduncularis =

Conservation status
- Priority Three — Poorly Known Taxa (DEC)

Scientific classification
- Kingdom: Plantae
- Clade: Tracheophytes
- Clade: Angiosperms
- Clade: Eudicots
- Clade: Asterids
- Order: Apiales
- Family: Apiaceae
- Genus: Xanthosia
- Species: X. peduncularis

Binomial name
- Xanthosia peduncularis Benth.

Species of flowering plant

Xanthosia peduncularis is a spreading perennial herb in the family Apiaceae and is endemic to the south of Western Australia. It has trifoliate leaves at the base of the plant and cream-coloured flowers in a compound umbel with 3 or 4 rays.

== Description ==
Xanthosia peduncularis is a spreading perennial herb that typically grows to a height of about 15 cm (5.9 in). Its leaves are trifoliate, arranged at the base of the plant, the leaflets linear or wedge-shaped. The flowers are arranged in a compound umbel with the flowers arranged in 3 or 4 rays and a few central flowers. There are narrow involucral bracts that are longer than the flowers and the sepals are heart-shaped. Flowering occurs from September to November.

== Taxonomy and naming ==
Xanthosia peduncularis was first formally described in 1867 by George Bentham in his Flora Australiensis from specimens collected by James Drummond. The specific epithet (peduncularis) means "pedunculate".

== Distribution and habitat ==
This species of xanthosia grows in gravelly sand in the Esperance Plains bioregion of southern Western Australia.

== Conservation status ==
Xanthosia peduncularis is listed as "Priority Three" by the Government of Western Australia Department of Biodiversity, Conservation and Attractions, meaning that it is poorly known and known from only a few locations but is not under imminent threat.
