= Xanthosia eichleri =

Conservation status
- Priority Four — Rare Taxa (DEC)

Scientific classification
- Kingdom: Plantae
- Clade: Tracheophytes
- Clade: Angiosperms
- Clade: Eudicots
- Clade: Asterids
- Order: Apiales
- Family: Apiaceae
- Genus: Xanthosia
- Species: X. eichleri

Binomial name
- Xanthosia eichleri J.M.Hart & Henwood

Species of flowering plant

Xanthosia eichleri is a species of flowering plant in the family Apiaceae and is endemic to the south of Western Australia. It is an erect, low-lying or prostrate subshrub with wedge-shaped leaves and mostly bisexual, cream-coloured or white flowers.

== Description ==
Xanthosia eichleri is an erect, low-lying or prostrate subshrub that grows to a height of 5–25 cm (2.0–9.8 in), its leaves wedge-shaped, 5–12 mm (0.20–0.47 in) long and 1–4 mm (0.039–0.157 in) wide on a sheathing petiole. The inflorescence is arranged opposite leaf axils with 2 to 6 umbels on a peduncle 1.0–3.6 mm (0.039–0.142 in) long.The flowers are bisexual, rarely male with 5 green sepals 1.0–1.6 mm (0.039–0.063 in) long. The petals are spatula-shaped, white or cream-coloured 0.7–0.8 mm (0.028–0.031 in) long and shorter than the sepals. Flowering occurs from October to November and the fruit is brown, oval and 1.7–1.9 mm (0.067–0.075 in) long and 1.3–2.0 mm (0.051–0.079 in) wide.

== Taxonomy and naming ==
Xanthosia eichleri was first formally described in 1998 by J.M. Hart and Murray J. Henwood in the journal Nuytsia from specimens collected near Gladstone Falls on the Deep River in 1990. The specific epithet (eichleri) means "belonging to Hansjörg Eichler", "in recognition of his contribution to the taxonomy of Xanthosia and the Australian Apiaceae".

== Distribution and habitat ==
Xanthosia eichleri grows on granite outcrops in woodland, often on roadsides, between Shannon National Park, Sheepwash Creek National Park and the southern coast of Western Australia, in the Esperance Plains, Jarrah Forest and Warren bioregions of south-western Western Australia.

== Conservation status ==
This species of xanthosia listed as "Priority Four" by the Government of Western Australia Department of Biodiversity, Conservation and Attractions, meaning that it is rare or near threatened.
