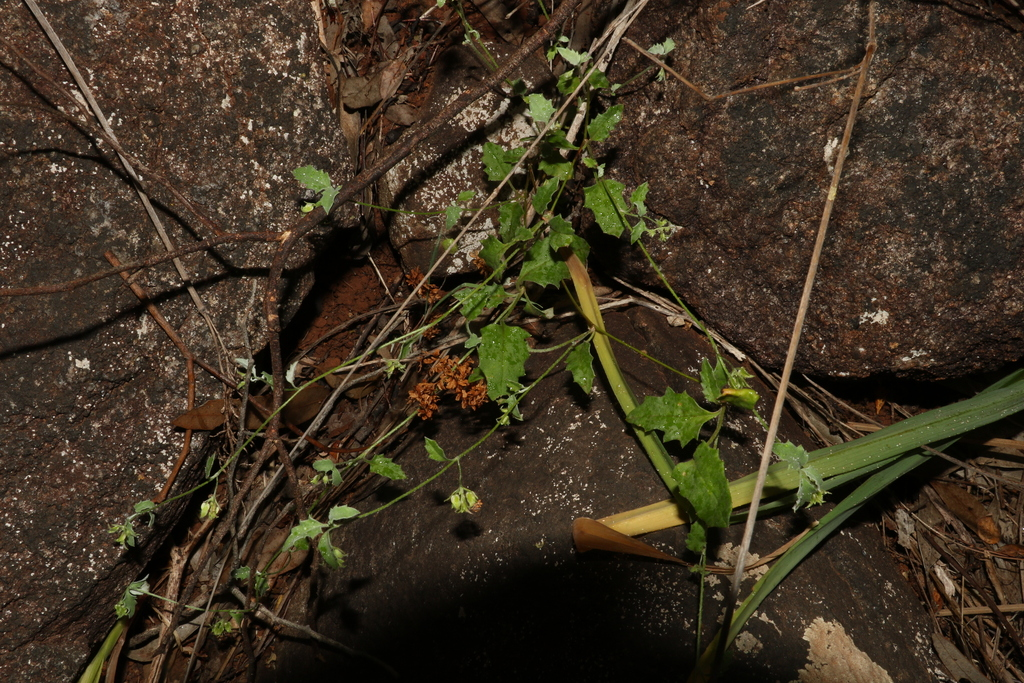

Scientific classification
- Kingdom: Plantae
- Clade: Tracheophytes
- Clade: Angiosperms
- Clade: Eudicots
- Clade: Asterids
- Order: Apiales
- Family: Apiaceae
- Genus: Xanthosia
- Species: X. candida

Binomial name
- Xanthosia candida (Benth.) Steud.

Synonyms
- Leucolaena candida Benth.; Xanthosia candida (Benth.) Steud. var. candida; Xanthosia hederifolia Benth.; Xanthosia sp. Fitzgerald (R.D.Royce 9266)

= Xanthosia candida =

Species of flowering plant

Xanthosia candida is a low-lying, perennial herb in the family Apiaceae and is endemic to the south-west of Western Australia. It has long, slender stems, irregularly toothed or lobed leaves and small white, green or creamy-yellow flowers.

== Description ==
Xanthosia candida is a low-lying perennial herb that typically grows to a height of 50 cm (20 in) and has long, slender, sometimes softly hairy stems. Its leaves vary in shape from broadly egg-shaped with the narrower end towards the base to round or oblong, and are coarsely or irregularly toothed or lobed. The leaves are mostly small, but sometimes up to 25 mm (0.98 in) long, woolly-hairy, especially on the lower surface, but become glabrous as they age. The inflorescence is a small compound umbel with four short rays. The lateral rays have one flower and 3 white, green or creamy-yellow bracts and the central flower without bracts. Flowering occurs from September to December or from January to May.

== Taxonomy and naming ==
This species was first formally described in 1837 by George Bentham who gave it the name Leucolaena candida in Enumeratio plantarum quas in Novae Hollandiae ora austro-occidentali ad fluvium Cygnorum et in sinu Regis Georgii collegit Carolus Liber Baro de Hügel from specimens collected by Charles von Hügel near the Swan River. In 1841, Ernst Gottlieb von Steudel transferred the species to Xanthosia as X. candida. The specific epithet (candida) means "becoming pure white".

== Distribution and habitat ==
Xanthosia candida grows on hills, ridges and rocky outcrops in the Esperance Plains, Jarrah Forest, Swan Coastal Plain and Warren bioregions of south-western Western Australia and is listed as "not threatened" by the Western Australian Government Department of Biodiversity, Conservation and Attractions.
