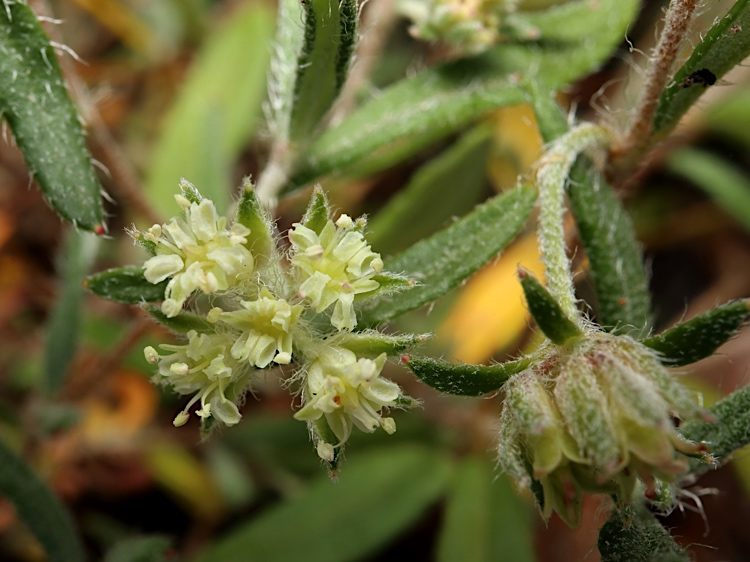
- Near Cataby

Scientific classification
- Kingdom: Plantae
- Clade: Tracheophytes
- Clade: Angiosperms
- Clade: Eudicots
- Clade: Asterids
- Order: Apiales
- Family: Apiaceae
- Genus: Xanthosia
- Species: X. ciliata

Binomial name
- Xanthosia ciliata (Hook.)

= Xanthosia ciliata =

Species of flowering plant

Xanthosia ciliata is a species of flowering plant in the family Apiaceae and is endemic to the south-west of Western Australia. It is a low spreading shrub with linear leaves and yellowish-green to cream-coloured or white flowers.

== Description ==
Xanthosia ciliata is a low, spreading shrub that typically grows to a height of 5–25 cm (2.0–9.8 in), its leaves linear to wedge-shaped. The inflorescence is arranged in leaf axils or on the ends of branches and is usually a small, compound umbel with four short rays. Each partial umbel is subtended by a leaf-like, softly-hairy involucral bract less than 2 mm (0.079 in) long. The sepals are tapering heart-shaped and the petals are yellowish-green to cream-coloured or white. Flowering occurs from October to December or January.

== Taxonomy and naming ==
Xanthosia ciliata was first formally described in 1848 by William Jackson Hooker in Icones Plantarum from specimens collected by James Drummond near the Swan River. The specific epithet (ciliata) means "fringed with fine hairs".

== Distribution and habitat ==
Xanthosia ciliata grows in lateritic soils, sand or clay in the Avon Wheatbelt, Esperance Plains, Geraldton Sandplains, Jarrah Forest and Swan Coastal Plain bioregions of south-western Western Australia and is listed as "not threatened" by the Western Australian Government Department of Biodiversity, Conservation and Attractions.
