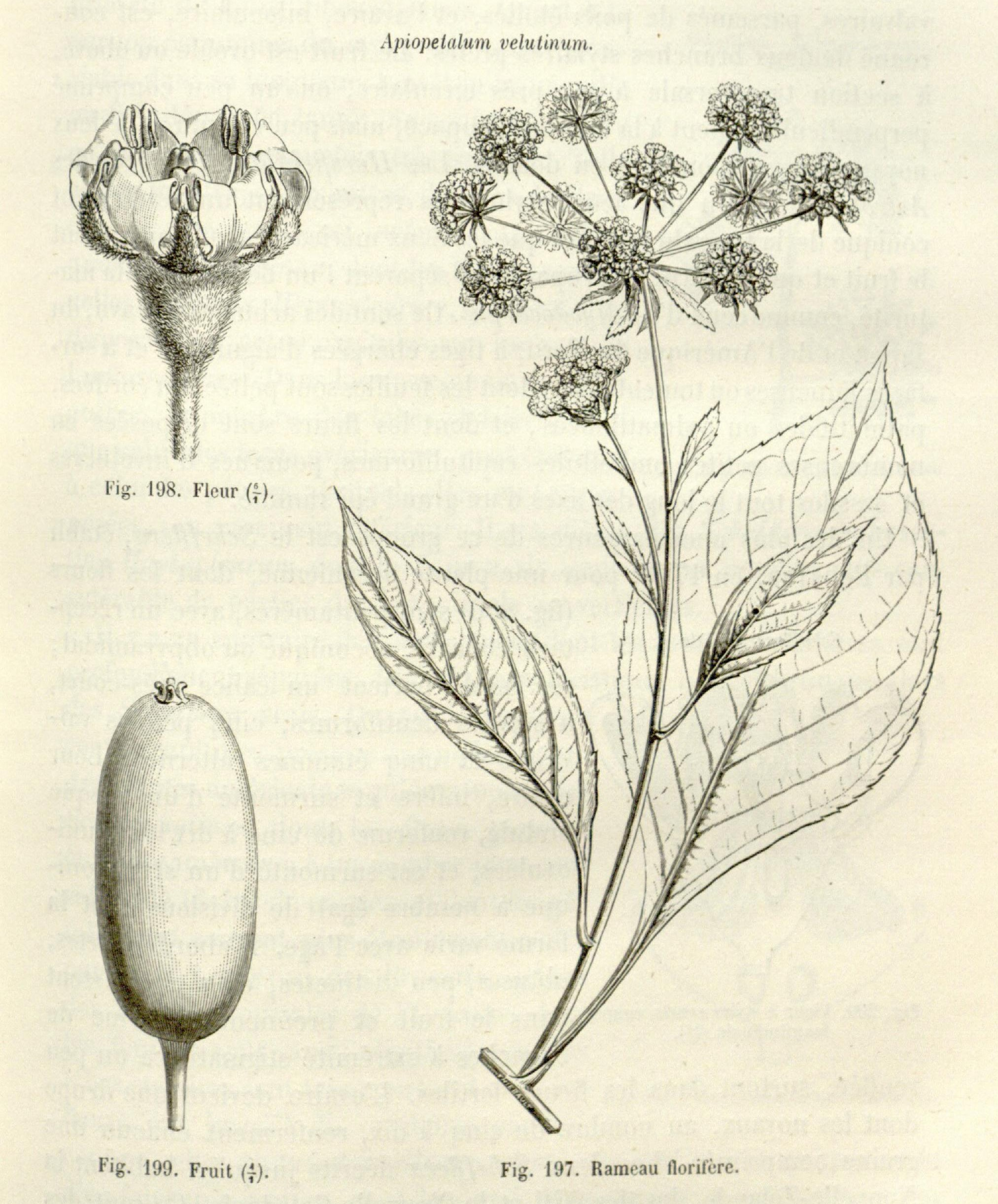
- Apiopetalum velutinum

Scientific classification
- Kingdom: Plantae
- Clade: Tracheophytes
- Clade: Angiosperms
- Clade: Eudicots
- Clade: Asterids
- Order: Apiales
- Family: Apiaceae
- Subfamily: Mackinlayoideae
- Genus: Apiopetalum; Baill.

Species
- Apiopetalum glabratum; Apiopetalum velutinum

= Apiopetalum =

Genus of flowering plants

Apiopetalum is a genus of plant in the family Apiaceae, comprising 2 species. They are small trees, reaching 6 m in height, and have simple leaves. The genus is endemic to New Caledonia. Its closest relative is the Australian Actinotus.
