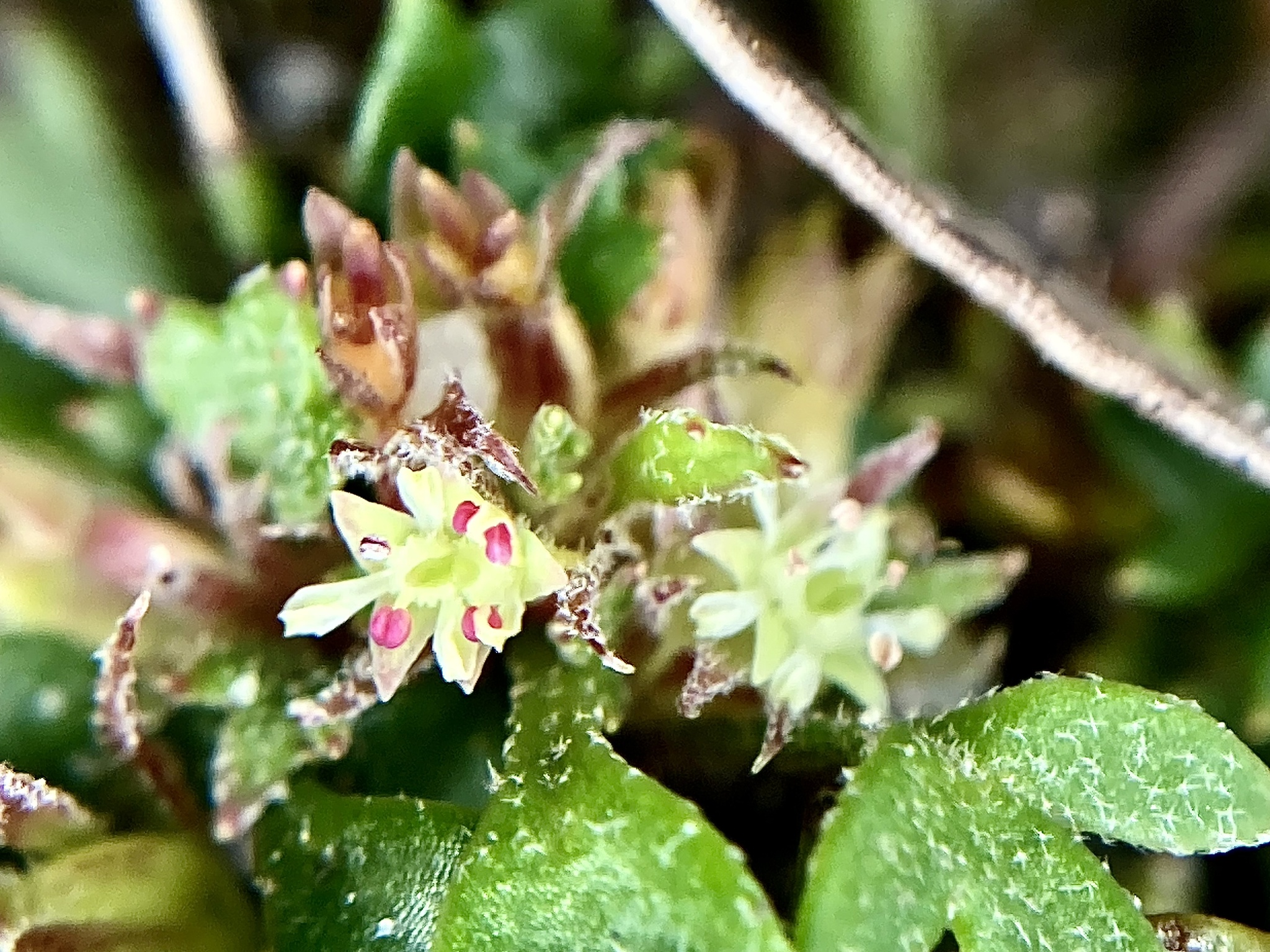
- In Mount Roe National Park

Scientific classification
- Kingdom: Plantae
- Clade: Tracheophytes
- Clade: Angiosperms
- Clade: Eudicots
- Clade: Asterids
- Order: Apiales
- Family: Apiaceae
- Genus: Xanthosia
- Species: X. singuliflora

Binomial name
- Xanthosia singuliflora F.Muell.

= Xanthosia singuliflora =

Species of flowering plant

Xanthosia singuliflora is a species of flowering plant the family Apiaceae and is endemic to the south-west of Western Australia. It is a tufted perennial herb with oblong to wedge-shaped leaves and sessile greenish-yellow flowers with 3 or 4 narrow bracts at the base.

== Description ==
Xanthosia singuliflora is a tufted perennial herb that typically grows to a height of mostly 5–20 cm (2.0–7.9 in) and has many slender, diffuse stems less than 30 cm (12 in) long. Its leaves are oblong to wedge-shaped, mostly less than 12 mm (0.47 in) long sometimes trifoliate on the ends, on a long petiole. The flowers are sessile or on a very short peduncle, surrounded by 3 or 4 narrow bracts at the base of a very short pedicel, with 2 broader bracts close under the flower. The sepals are pointed and the petals are greenish-yellow. Flowering occurs from September to November and the fruit is prominently ribbed.

== Taxonomy and naming ==
Xanthosia singuliflora was first formally described in 1864 by Ferdinand von Mueller in his Fragmenta Phytographiae Australiae from specimens collected at Cape Pasley. The specific epithet (singuliflora) means "single-flowered".

== Distribution and habitat ==
Xanthosia leiophylla grows on granite outcrops, undulating plains and winter-wet areas in the Avon Wheatbelt, Esperance Plains, Jarrah Forest and Warren bioregions of south-western Western Australia.
