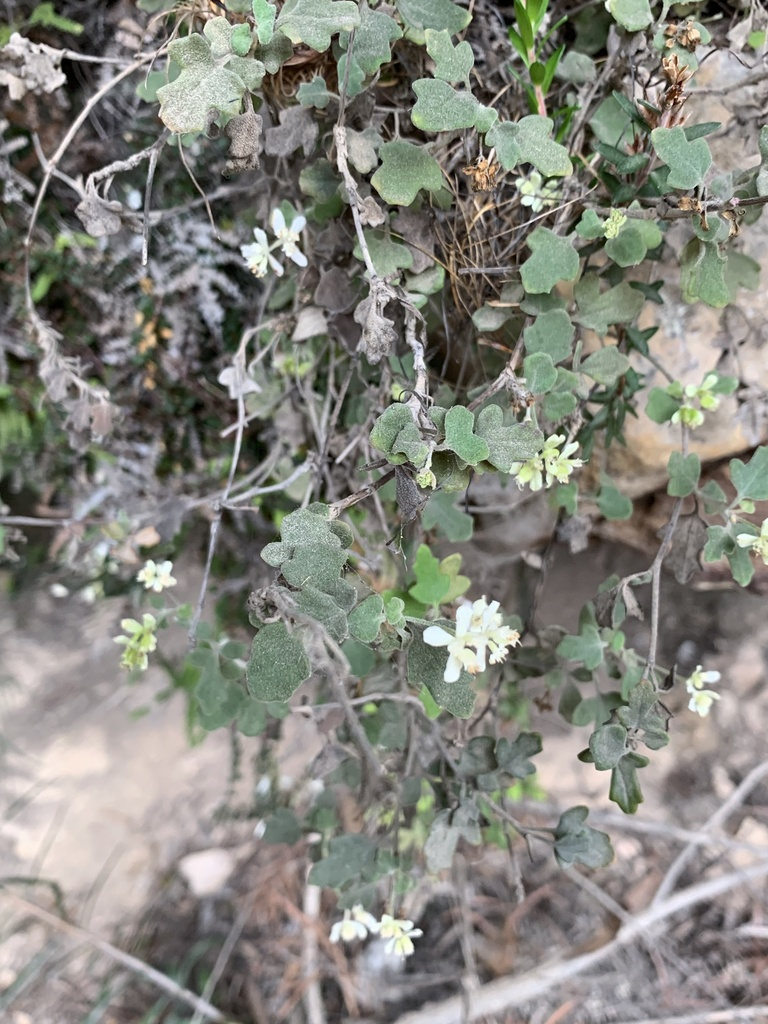
- Near Wentworth Falls

Scientific classification
- Kingdom: Plantae
- Clade: Tracheophytes
- Clade: Angiosperms
- Clade: Eudicots
- Clade: Asterids
- Order: Apiales
- Family: Apiaceae
- Genus: Xanthosia
- Species: X. scopulicola

Binomial name
- Xanthosia scopulicola J.M.Hart & Henwood

= Xanthosia scopulicola =

Species of flowering plant

Xanthosia scopulicola is a species of flowering plant in the family Apiaceae and is endemic to a small area of New South Wales. It is an ascending perennial subshrub with trifoliate juvenile leaves, later egg-shaped leaves with wavy edges, and white flowers in a compound umbel with 2 or 3 rays with up to 4 flowers in each ray.

== Description ==
Xanthosia scopulicola is an ascending, perennial subshrub that typically grows to a height of up to 20 cm (7.9 in) and is covered with star-shaped, woolly hairs. Its juvenile leaves are trifoliate, the leaflets egg-shaped, the end leaflet 5–20 mm (0.20–0.79 in) long and 5–25 mm (0.20–0.98 in) wide, the edges wavy. Adults leaves are similar in size and dimensions to the end leaflet of juvenile leaves. The flowers are arranged in a compound umbel on a peduncle 5–25 mm (0.20–0.98 in) long, with 2 or 3 rays, each with up to 4 flowers per ray. There are petal-like yellow involucral bracts 3–5 mm (0.12–0.20 in) long at the base of the flowers. The sepals are 1.0–1.2 mm (0.039–0.047 in) long and the petals are white, 1.0–1.2 mm (0.039–0.047 in) long. Flowering occurs from November to January.

== Taxonomy and naming ==
Xanthosia scopulicola was first formally described in 2000 by J.M.Hart and Murray J. Henwood in Australian Systematic Botany, from specimens collected on the Giant Stairway. The specific epithet (scopulicola) refers to the species' preference for cliff habitats.

== Distribution and habitat ==
This species of xanthosia is restricted to the Jamison Valley, where it grows in cracks and crevices of sandstone cliff faces or roocky outcrops above the cliffs.

== Conservation status ==
Xanthosia scopulicola is listed as "vulnerable" under the New South Wales Biodiversity Conservation Act 2016. The main threats to the species are habitat degradation, urban runoff and lack of information about its distribution.
