= Chlaenosciadium =

Scientific classification
- Kingdom: Plantae
- Clade: Tracheophytes
- Clade: Angiosperms
- Clade: Eudicots
- Clade: Asterids
- Order: Apiales
- Family: Apiaceae
- Subfamily: Mackinlayoideae
- Genus: Chlaenosciadium; C.Norman
- Species: C. gardneri

Binomial name
- Chlaenosciadium gardneri C.Norman

Genus of flowering plants

Chlaenosciadium gardneri is a species of flowering plant in the family Apiaceae, of the monotypic genus Chlaenosciadium. It is endemic to the Western Australia.
