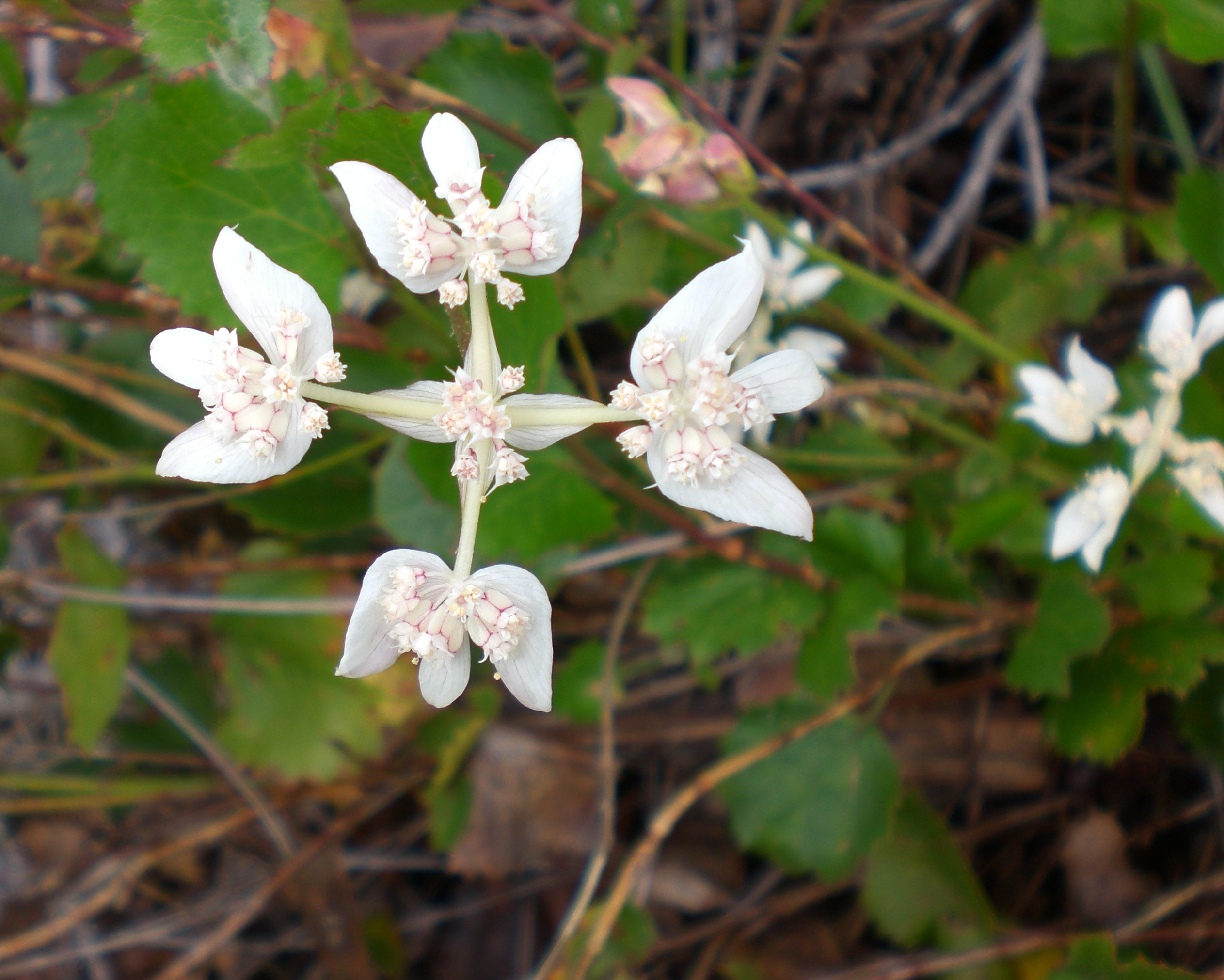
- Xanthosia rotundifolia near Torndirrup

Scientific classification
- Kingdom: Plantae
- Clade: Tracheophytes
- Clade: Angiosperms
- Clade: Eudicots
- Clade: Asterids
- Order: Apiales
- Family: Apiaceae
- Genus: Xanthosia
- Species: X. rotundifolia

Binomial name
- Xanthosia rotundifolia DC.

Synonyms
- Leucolaena rotundifolia (DC.) Benth.; Leucolaena rotundifolia (DC.) Benth. var. rotundifolia; Xanthosia rotundifolia var. hypoleuca Diels; Xanthosia rotundifolia DC. var. rotundifolia

= Xanthosia rotundifolia =

Southern cross

Species of flowering plant

Xanthosia rotundifolia, commonly known as southern cross, is a species of flowering plant in the family Apiaceae and is endemic to the south-west of Western Australia. It is an erect, perennial herb with serrated or toothed leaves and white to creamy-yellow flowers.

== Description ==
Xanthosia rotundifolia is an erect perennial herb that typically grows to a height of up to 60 cm (24 in). Its leaves are round to egg-shaped or wedge-shaped, and leathery with serrated or toothed edges. The flowers are arranged in a compound umbel usually with four branches in the form of a cross, each branch 30–60 mm (1.2–2.4 in) wide with a petal-like bract 15 mm (0.59 in) long at the base. Flowering occurs over a long period with a peak in spring.

== Taxonomy ==
Xanthosia rotundifolia was first formally described in 1829 by Augustin Pyramus de Candolle in Collection de Mémoires pour Servir a l'Histoire de Regne Vegetal. The specific epithet (rotundifolia) means "round-leaved".

== Distribution and habitat ==
Southern cross grows in gravelly, lateritic soils in rocky places, swamps and open woodland in the Esperance Plains, Jarrah Forest and Warren bioregions of the south-west of Western Australia.
