= Mary Lawrance =

English flower painter (1776–1845)

- Born: 21 May 1781; Holborn, Middlesex, England
- Died: 27 March 1845 (aged 63); Portland Place, London
- Notable work: The Various Kinds of Roses Cultivated in England
- Style: Botanical illustration

Mary Lawrance Kearse (21 May 1781 – 27 March 1845) was a British botanical illustrator who specialized in flowers. She also taught botanical illustration. She charged half a guinea for her lessons. She is best known for producing the earliest published work on roses.

Lawrance was born at the British Lying-In Hospital in Holborn, London, to Mary and William Lawrance, a tailor.

Her first known exhibition was at the Royal Academy of Arts in 1795. Between 1796 and 1799 she created and published The Various Kinds of Roses Cultivated in England. The book featured paintings of roses that Lawrance drew from nature. She also engraved and hand coloured the plates of the book and undertook the printing and publishing of the volume. In 1814, she married Thomas Kearse in Marylebone, continuing to work under her married name Mrs Kearse. She exhibited work until 1830. Her work is held in the collection of the New York Public Library, the Auckland Libraries Heritage Collection, and the Cleveland Museum of Art.

She died on 27 March 1845 at her home at 48 Foley Street, Portland Place, Marylebone, London, and was buried at St Mary's Church, Paddington Green.

== Works by Mary Lawrance ==
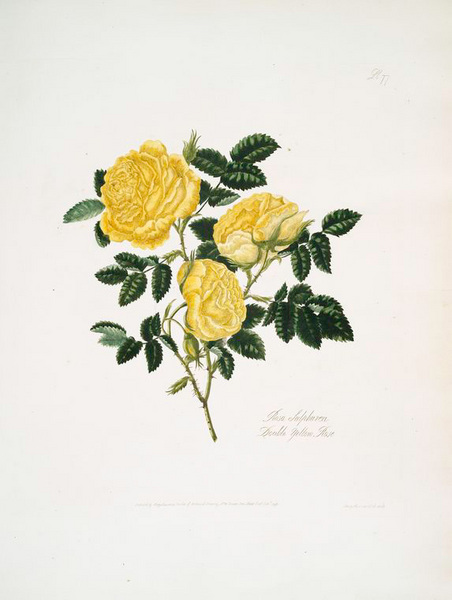
from A Collection of Roses from Nature

The standard author abbreviation Lawrance is used to indicate this person as the author when citing a botanical name.

- A Collection of Roses from Nature, 1799

A Collection of Roses from Nature consists of 90 etched, hand-colored plates that were created between July 1796 and February 1799. This work was dedicated to Queen Charlotte. It was donated by the Mackelvie Trust to Auckland Libraries in November 2014.

- Sketches of Flowers from Nature, 1801

Sketches of Flowers from Nature consists of 11 hand-etched, stippled, and colored plates created between 1800 and 1801.

- A Collection of Passion Flowers Coloured from Nature, 1802

A Collection of Passion Flowers consists of 18 hand-colored, hand-engraved plates created between 1799 and 1802. A prospectus from May 1, 1799, indicates that the creation of 30 plates was originally planned, although only 18 were ever published.
