= Feddes Repertorium =

Feddes Repertorium - Journal of Botanical Taxonomy and Geobotany
- Discipline: Botany
- Language: English
- Edited by: Thomas Stützel

Publication details
- Former names: Feddes Repertorium. Zeitschrift für Botanische Taxonomy und Geobotanik; Feddes Repertorium Specierum Novarum Regni Vegetabilis; Repertorium Specierum Novarum Regni Vegetabilis
- History: 1905–present
- Publisher: Wiley VCH
- Frequency: Quarterly

Standard abbreviations
- ISO 4: Feddes Repert.

Indexing
- ISSN: 0014-8962 (print); 1522-239X (web)
- LCCN: sn85005741
- OCLC no.: 49805035

Links
- Journal homepage; Online access; Online archive

Feddes Repertorium - Journal of Botanical Taxonomy and Geobotany is a quarterly peer-reviewed scientific journal that was established in 1905 as Repertorium Specierum Novarum Regni Vegetabilis. In 1942 it was renamed Feddes Repertorium Specierum Novarum Regni Vegetabilis, obtaining its current name in 1965. The journal is named after its founding editor-in-chief, Friedrich Karl Georg Fedde.
