= Edward Rudge =

English botanist and antiquary (1763–1846)

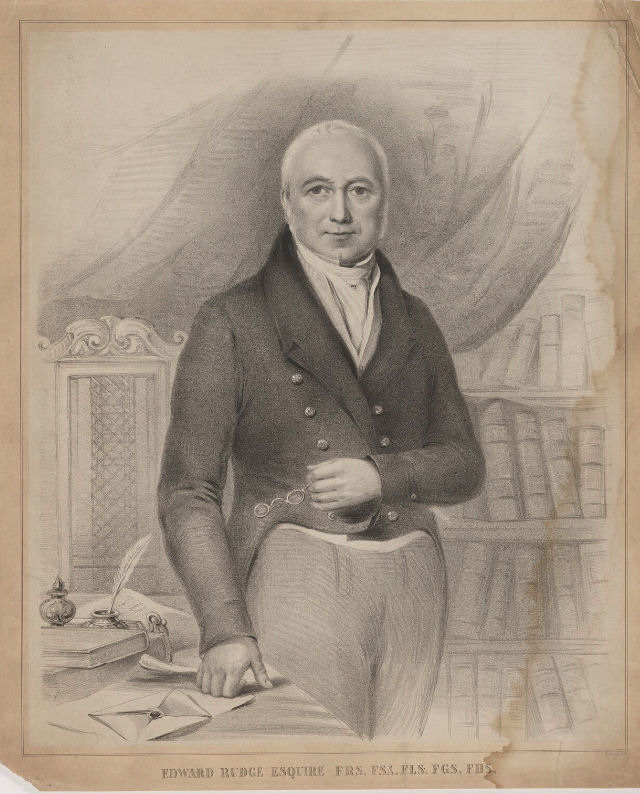
Edward Rudge by Lowes Cato Dickinson

Edward Rudge FSA (27 June 1763 – 3 September 1846) was an English botanist and antiquary.

== Life ==
He was the son of Edward Rudge, a merchant and alderman of Salisbury, who possessed a large portion of the abbey estate at Evesham. His mother was Elizabeth Long, sister of William Long. Rudge matriculated from Queen's College, Oxford, on 11 October 1781, but took no degree. His attention was early turned to botany, through the influence of his uncle, Samuel Rudge (died 1817), a retired barrister, who formed an herbarium, which passed to his nephew. His uncle's encouragement and the purchase of a fine series of plants from The Guianas, collected by Joseph Martin, led Rudge to study the flora of that country, and to publish between 1805 and 1807 Plantarum Guianæ rariorum icones et descriptiones hactenus ineditæ, fol. London.

Between 1811 and 1834 he conducted a series of excavations in those portions of the Evesham Abbey estate under his control, and communicated the results to the Society of Antiquaries of London, who figured the ruins and relics discovered in their Vetusta Monumenta, accompanied by a memoir from Rudge's son. In 1842 he erected an octagon tower on the battlefield of Evesham, commemorative of Simon de Montfort, earl of Leicester.

Rudge was at an early period elected a fellow of the Society of Antiquaries, to the Linnean Society in 1802, and to the Royal Society in 1805. In 1829 he was appointed High Sheriff of Worcestershire.

He died at the Abbey Manor House, Evesham, on 3 September 1846. He married twice, including to the botanist Anne Rudge (1761–1836). A genus of the family Rubiaceae was named Rudgea in his honour by Richard Anthony Salisbury in 1806 (Trans. of Linn. Soc. viii. 326). His library of botanical and travel books, some inherited from his uncle Samuel Rudge, was sold by his descendant John Edward Rudge in 1930.

Besides the work above named, Rudge was author of some seven botanical papers in the Royal and Linnean societies' publications, and of several papers in Archæologia. One of these was a 'Description of Seven New Species of Plants from New Holland'.

His son, Edward John Rudge, M.A. (1792–1861), of Caius College, Cambridge, and barrister-at-law, was a fellow of the Society of Antiquaries, and author of Some Account of the History and Antiquities of Evesham, 1820, and Illustrated and Historical Account of Buckden Palace, 1839.

== Work ==
- Rudge, Edward (1805). Plantarum Guianae rariorum icones et descriptiones hactenus ineditae (in Latin). London: Sumptibus auctoris.

== Bibliography ==
- "Rudge, Edward" . Dictionary of National Biography. London: Smith, Elder & Co. 1885–1900.
