= McKay Reserve, Palm Beach, New South Wales =

Coordinates: 33°36′17″S 151°19′24″E

McKay Reserve

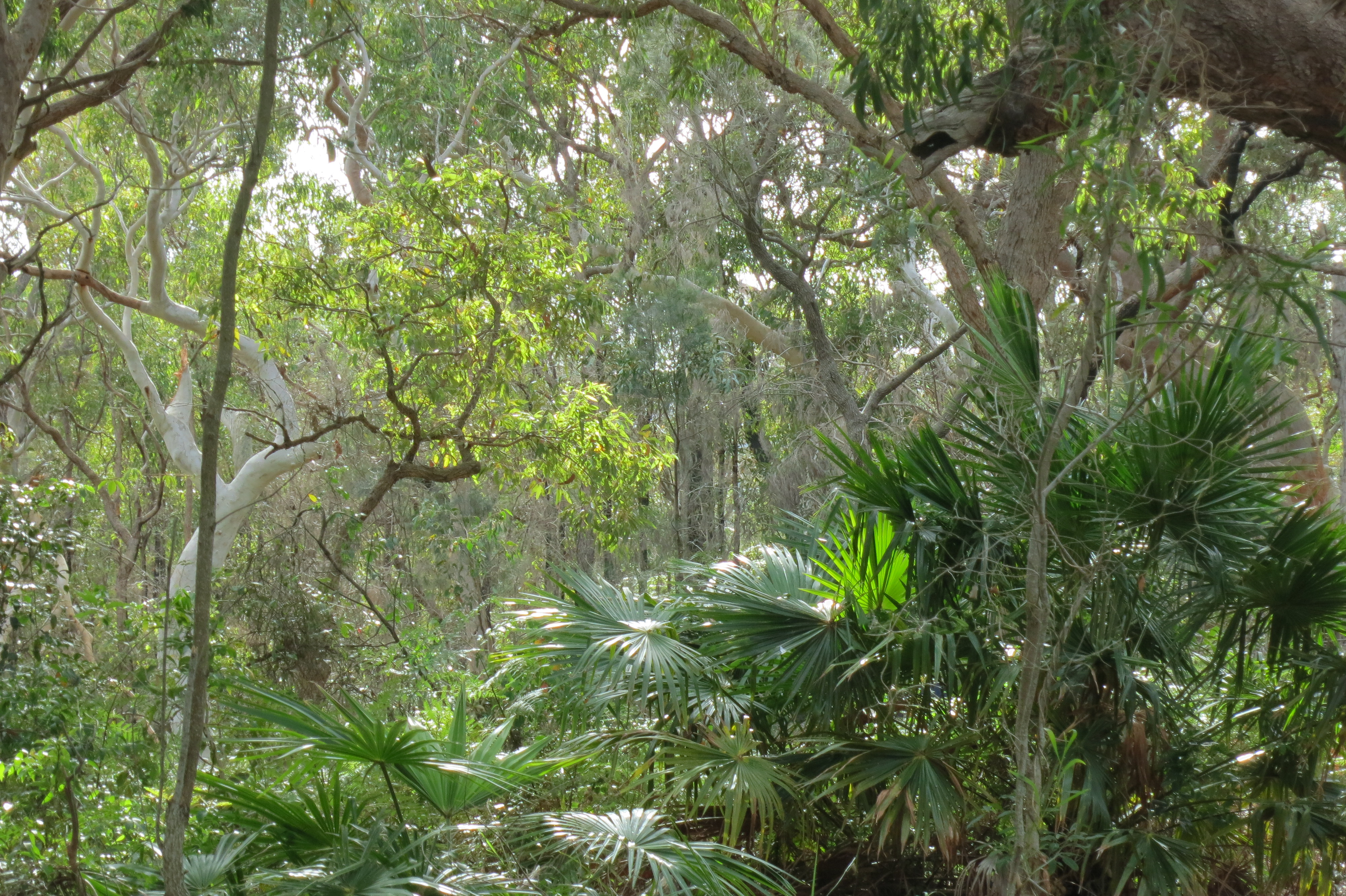
Livistona australis, gums & understorey, McKay Reserve

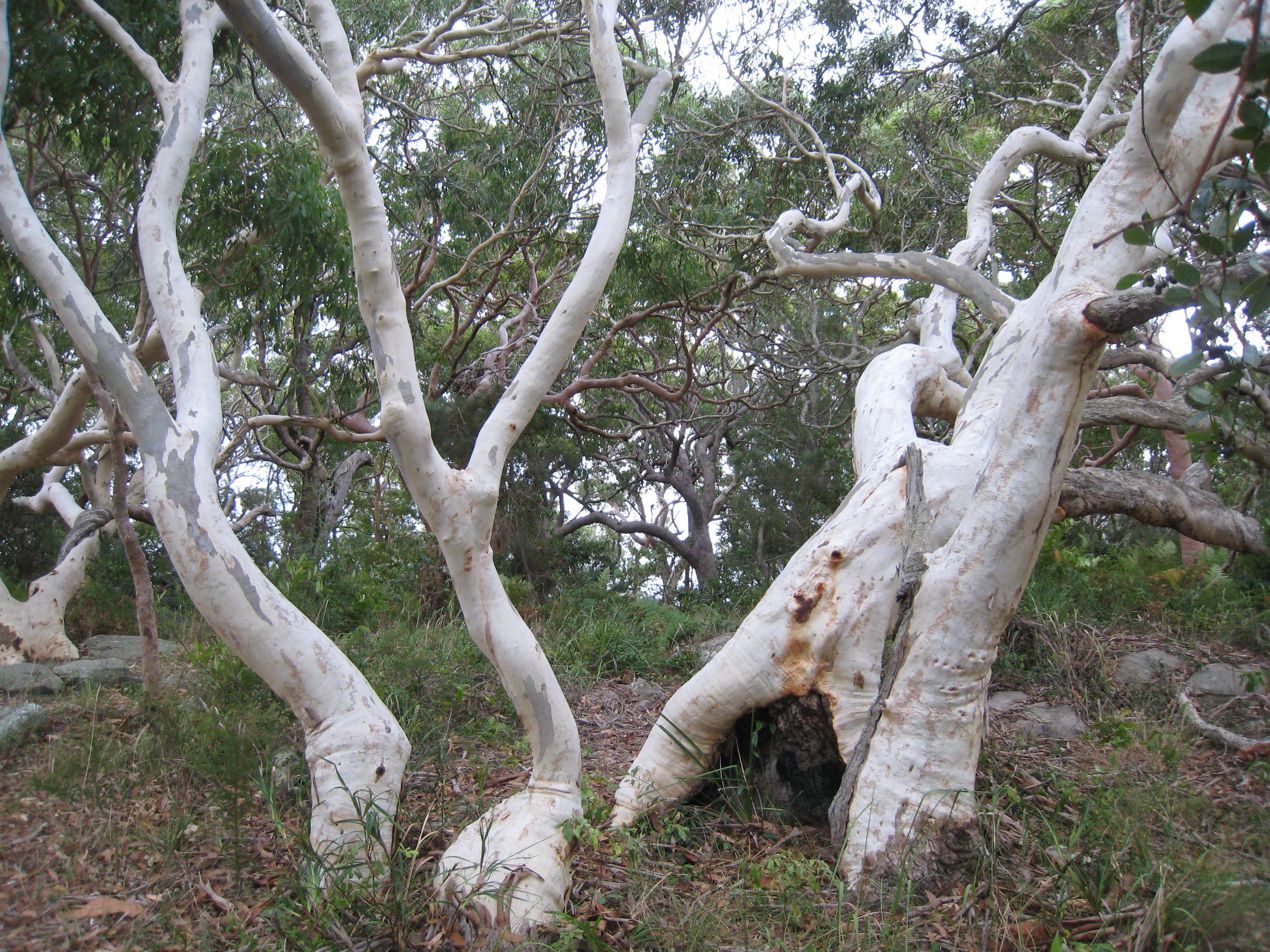
Eucalyptus haemastoma McKay Reserve

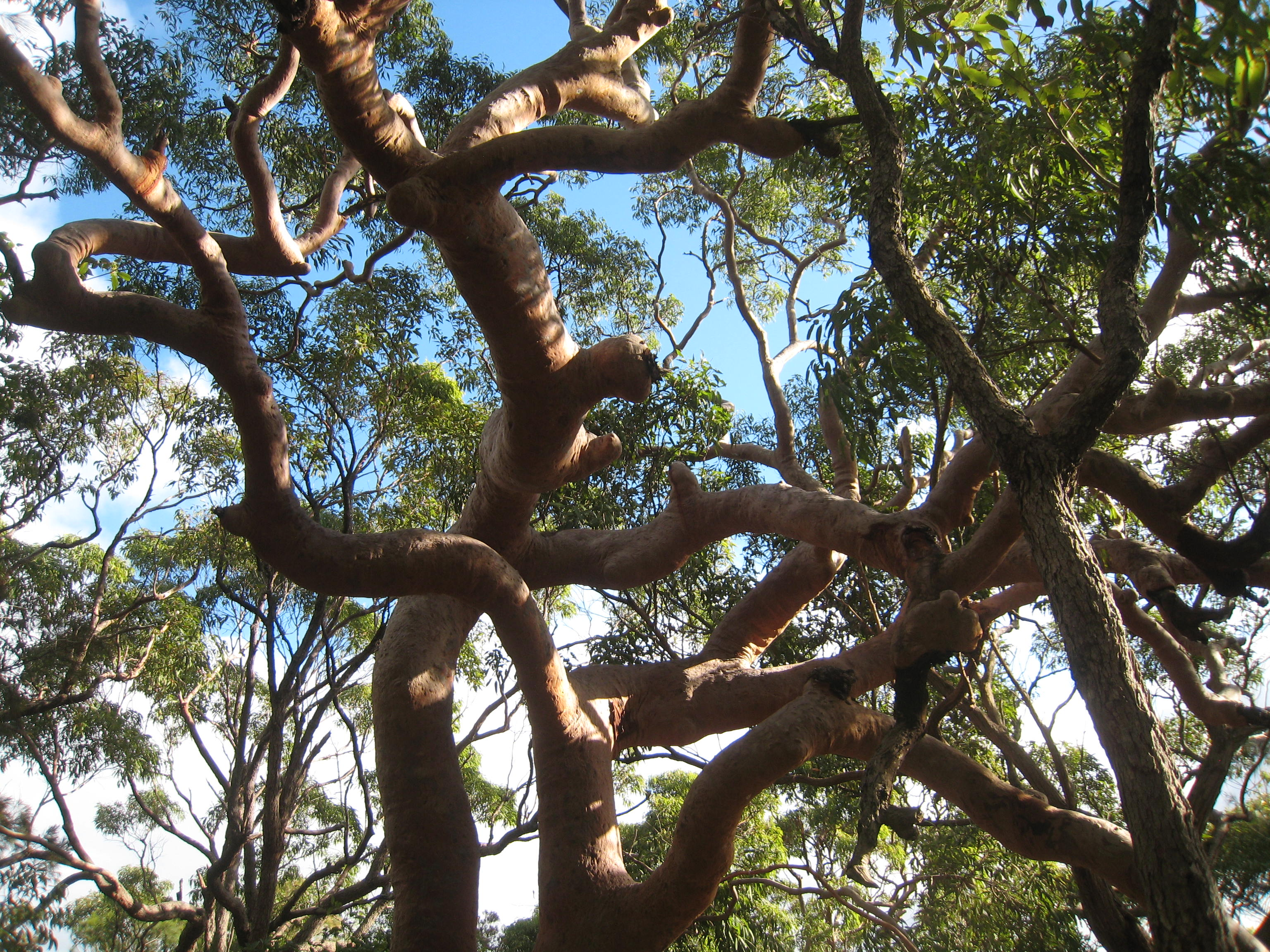
Angophora costata McKay Reserve

McKay Reserve is a small tract of remnant urban bushland in Palm Beach, parts of which contain the endangered ecological community (EEC) Pittwater and Wagstaffe Spotted Gum Forest. The reserve lies on a ridge on the Barrenjoey Peninsula and overlooks western Pittwater.

Mapping by the NSW Office of Environment and Heritage in 2013 shows the reserve as also containing Coastal escarpment littoral rainforest, a particular subgroup of the Littoral Rainforest community, which is also an endangered ecological community.

== Flora species list ==
The flora species list is taken from Smith & Smith (1992). Species from other lists are referenced individually. Species introduced from overseas are prefixed with an asterisk (*), non-local Australian species with #. Of the 362 plant species listed by Smith & Smith, 125 (approximately one third) are naturalised introduced species.

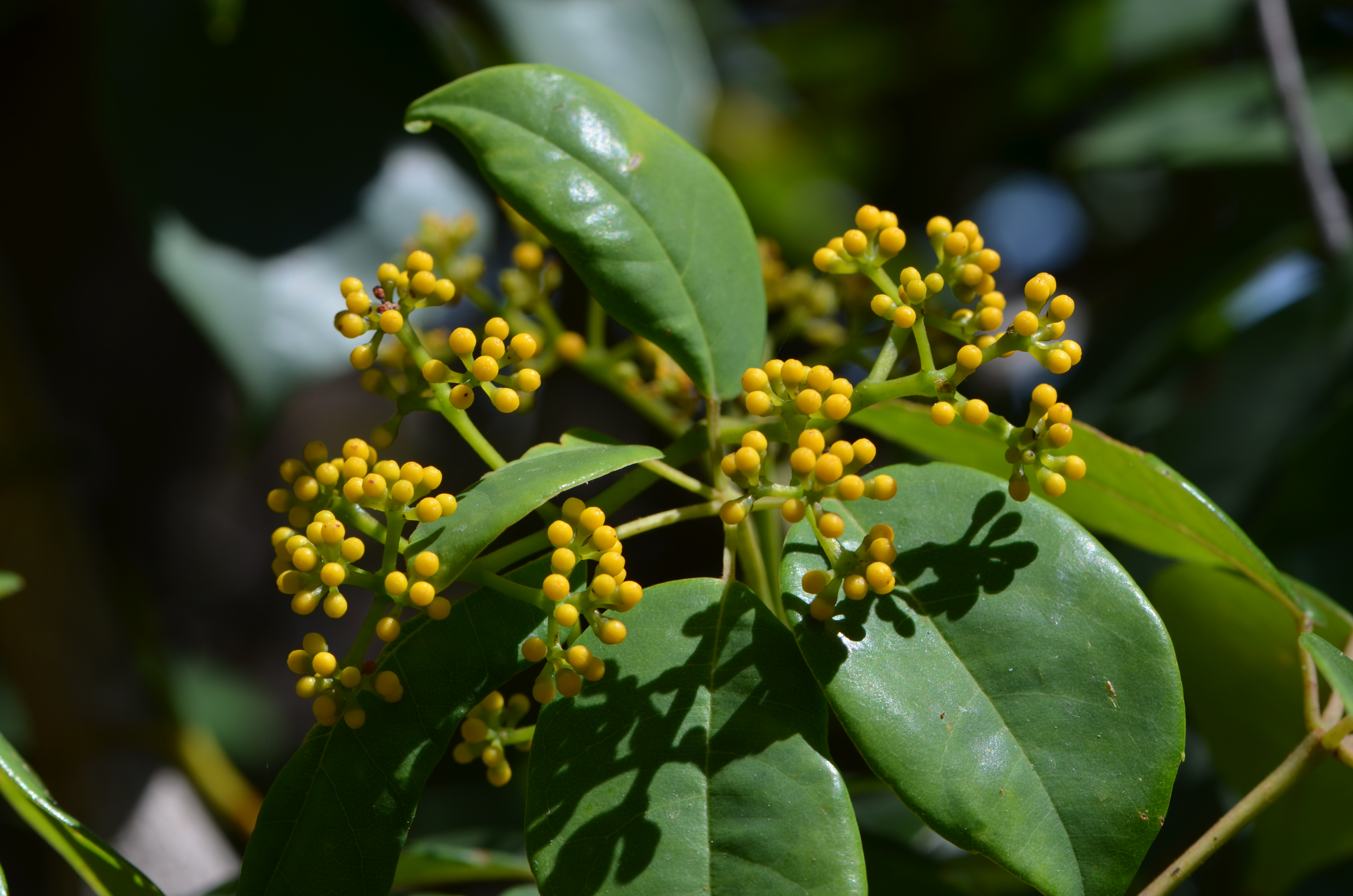
Cissus hypoglauca

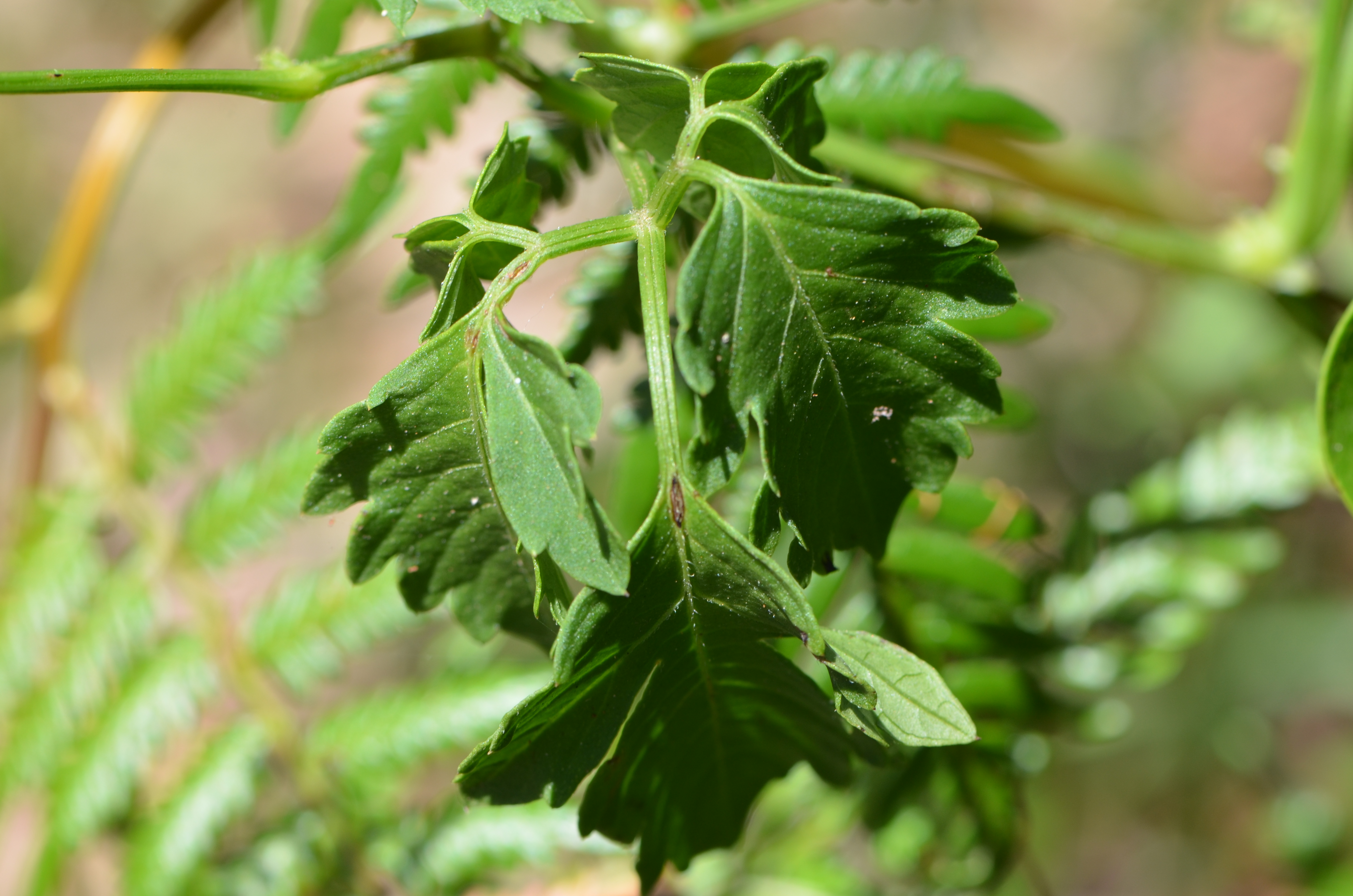
Cayratia clematidea

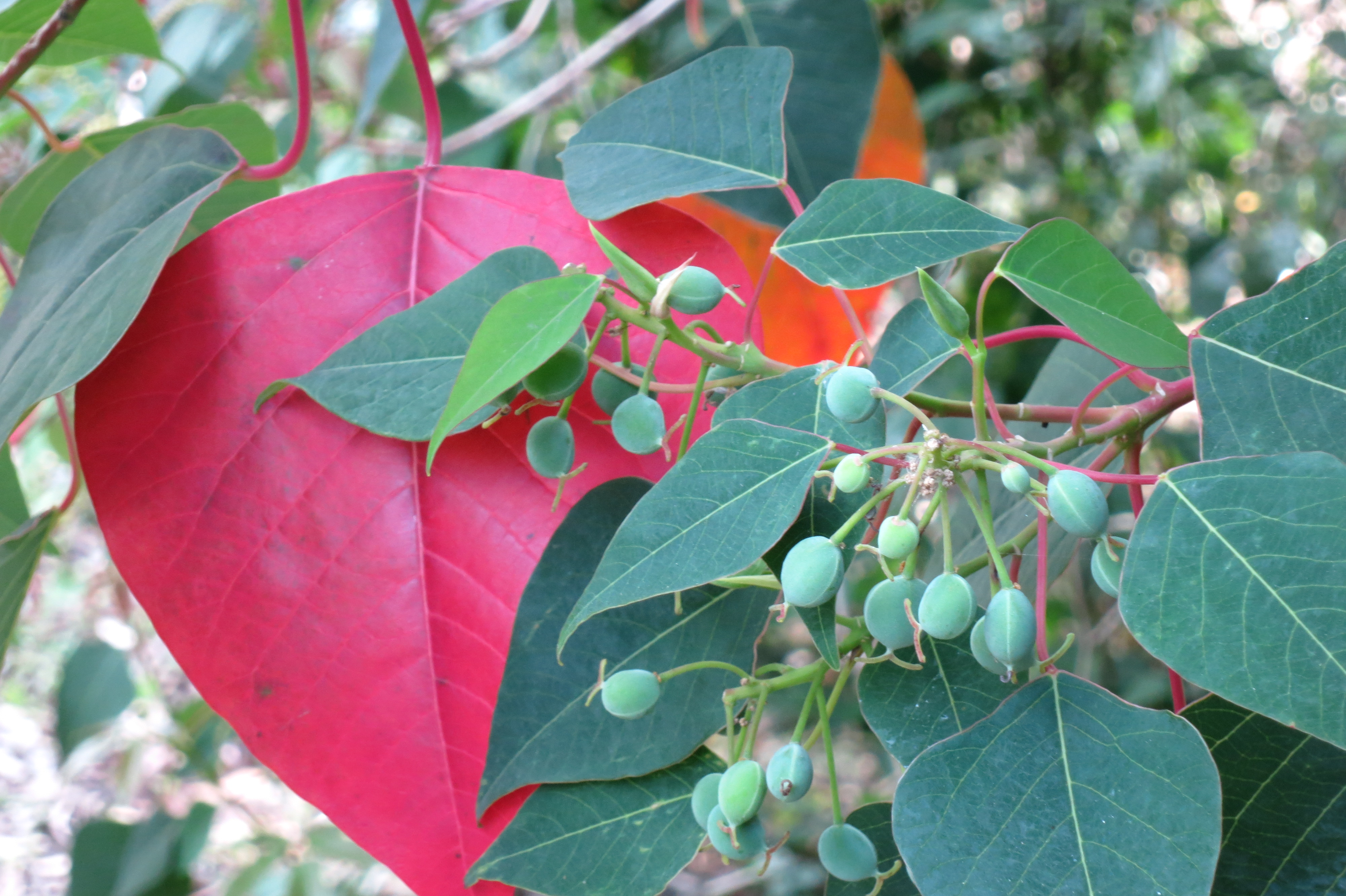
Homalanthus populifolius

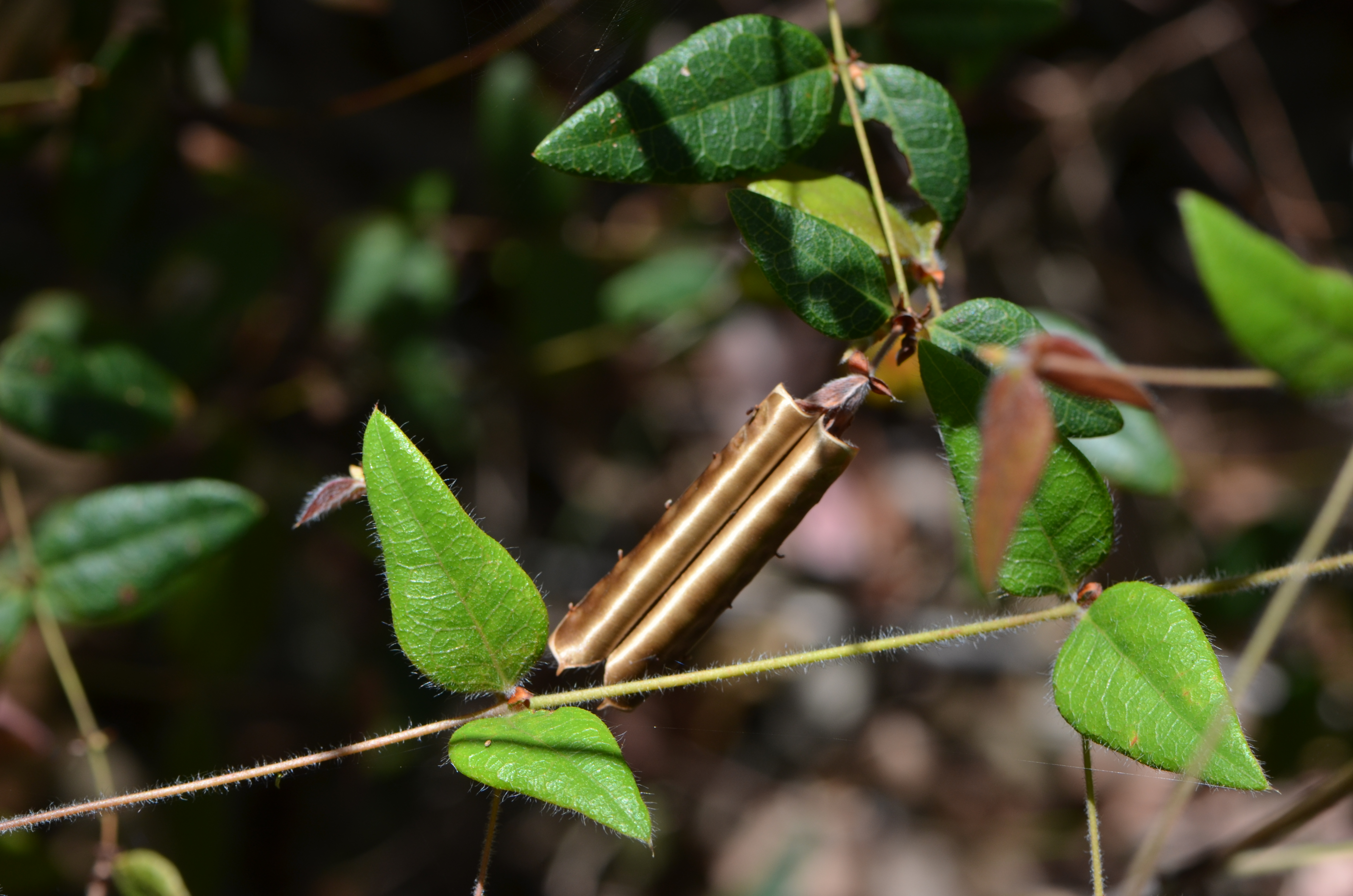
Platylobium formosum

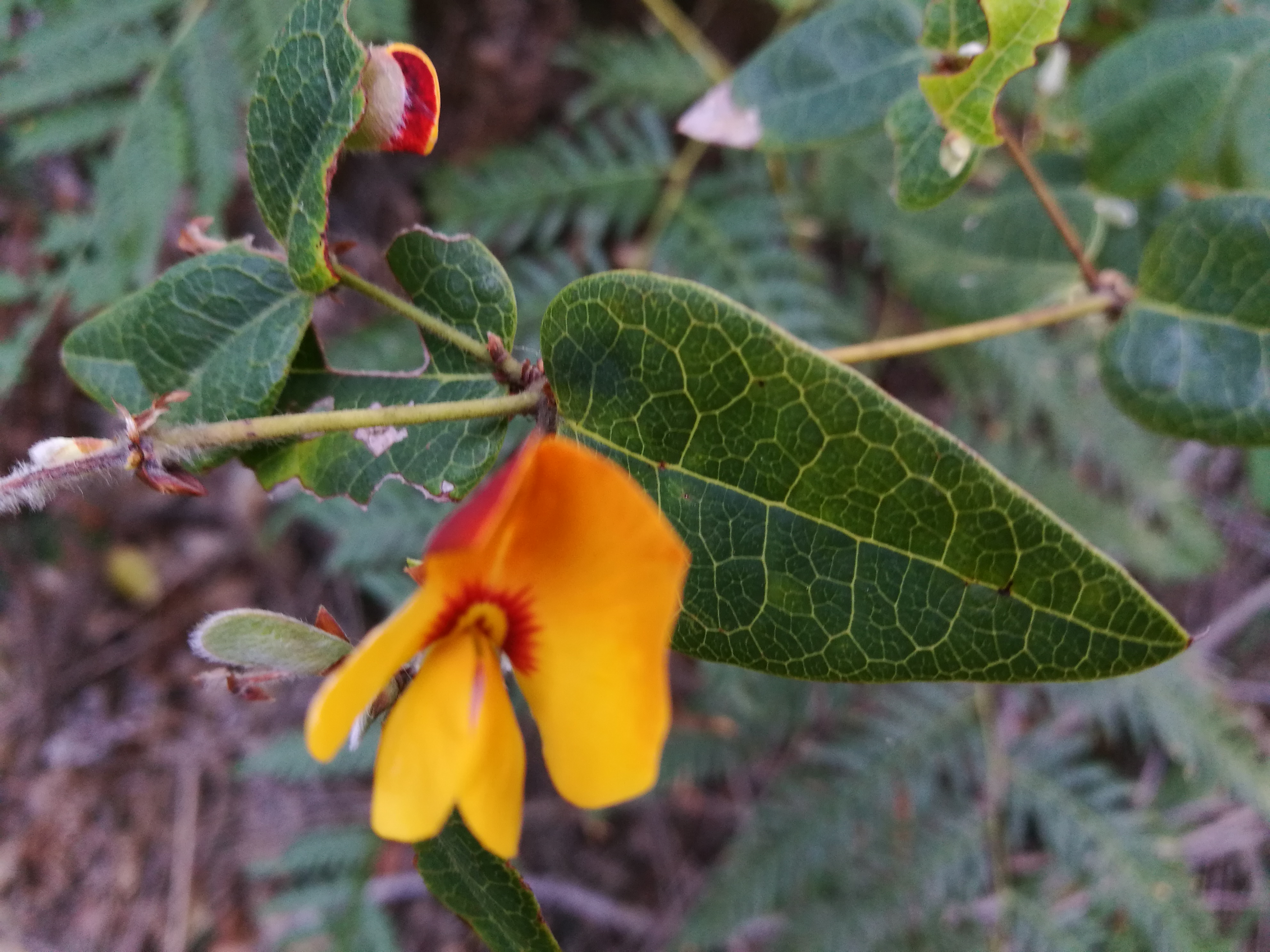
Platylobium formosum

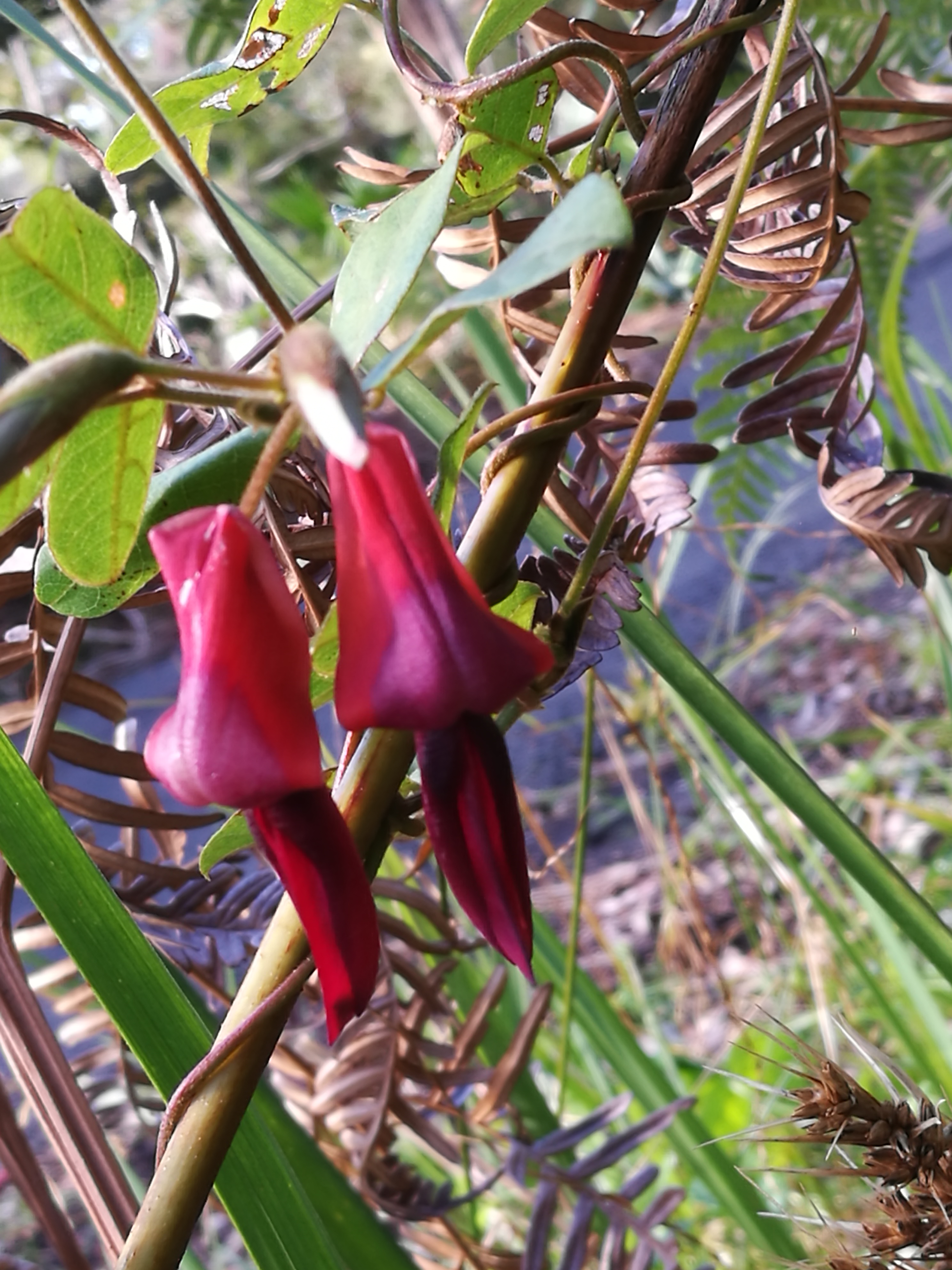
Kennedia rubicunda

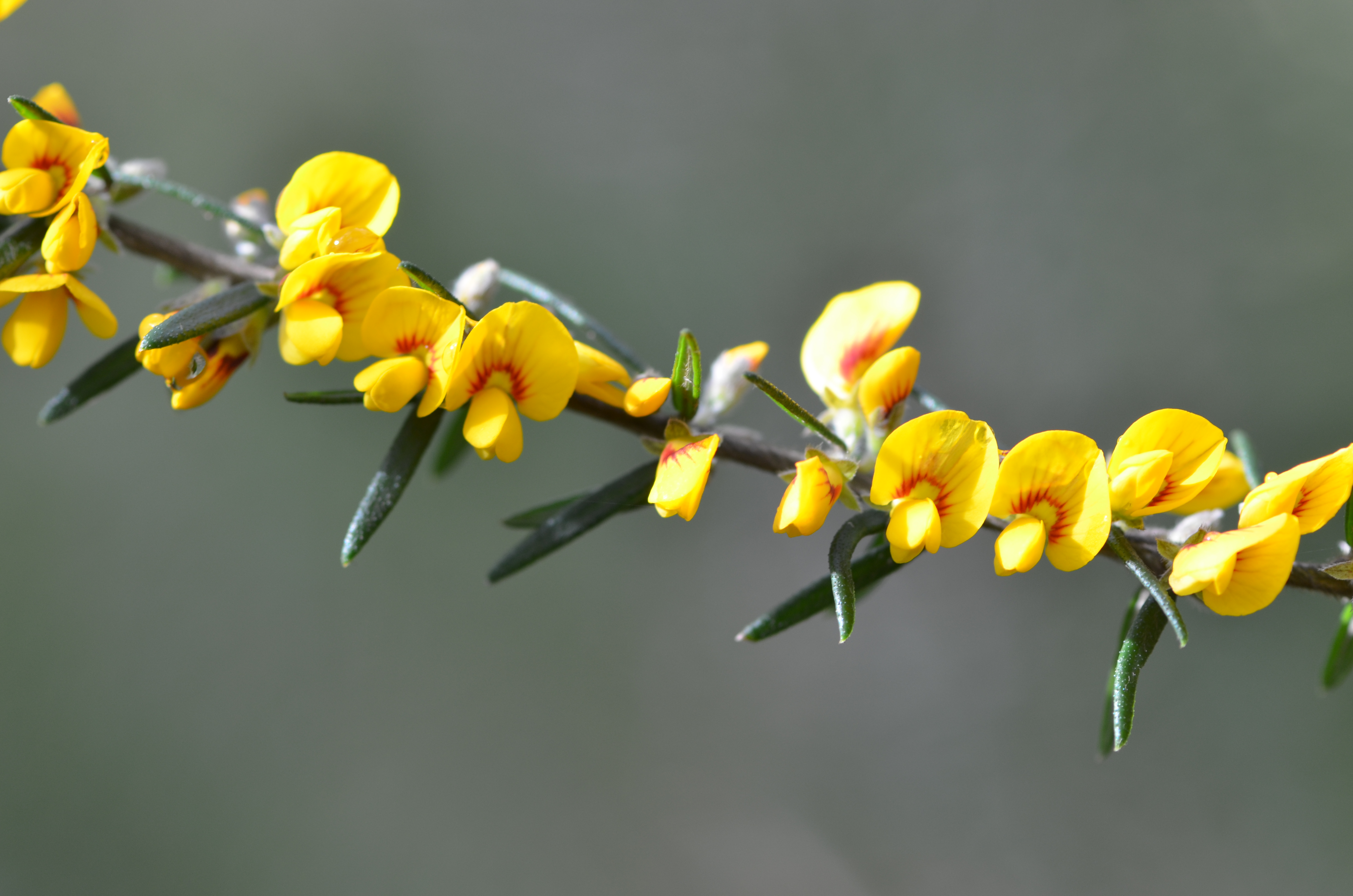
Aotus ericoides

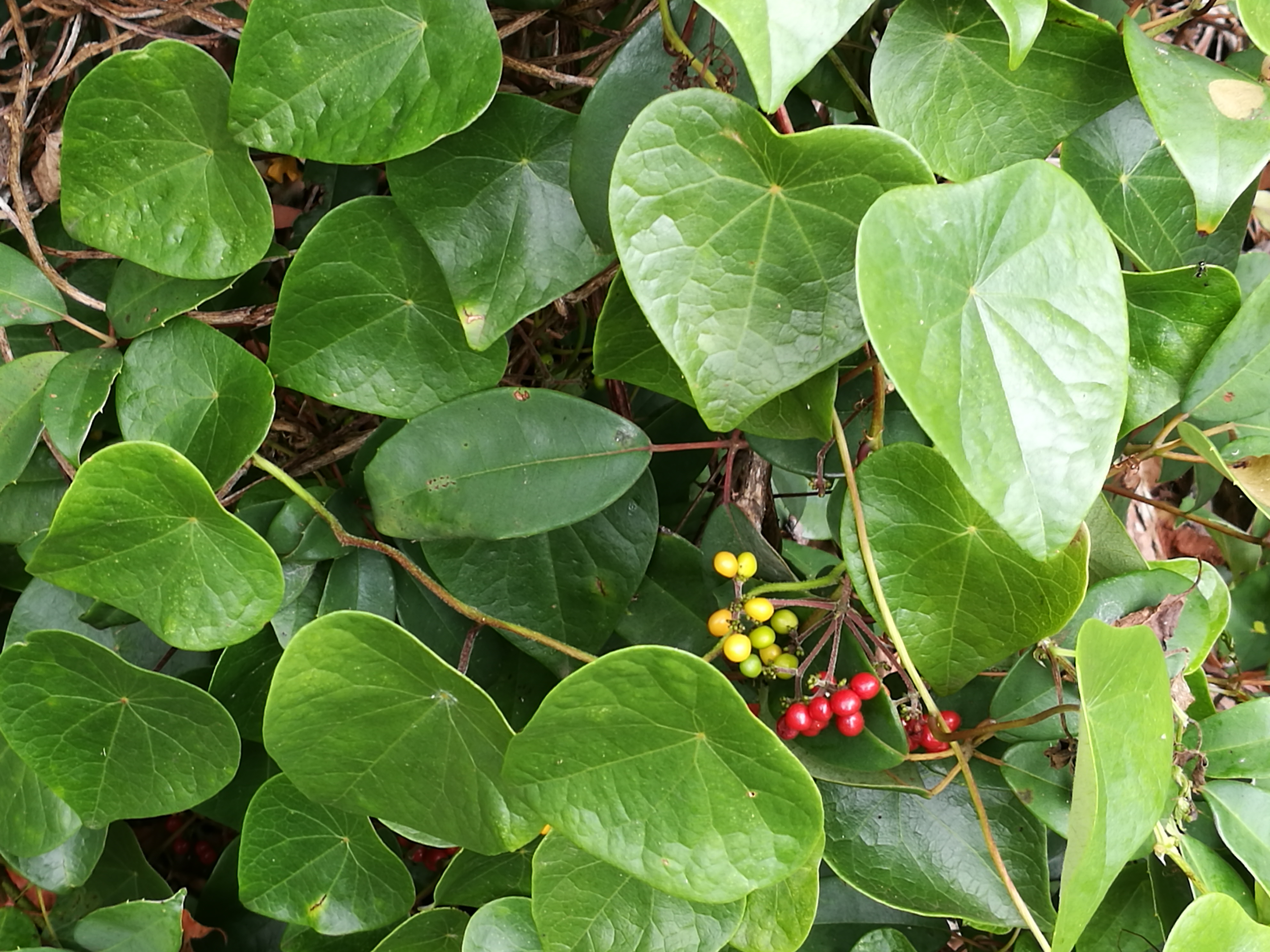
Stephania japonica

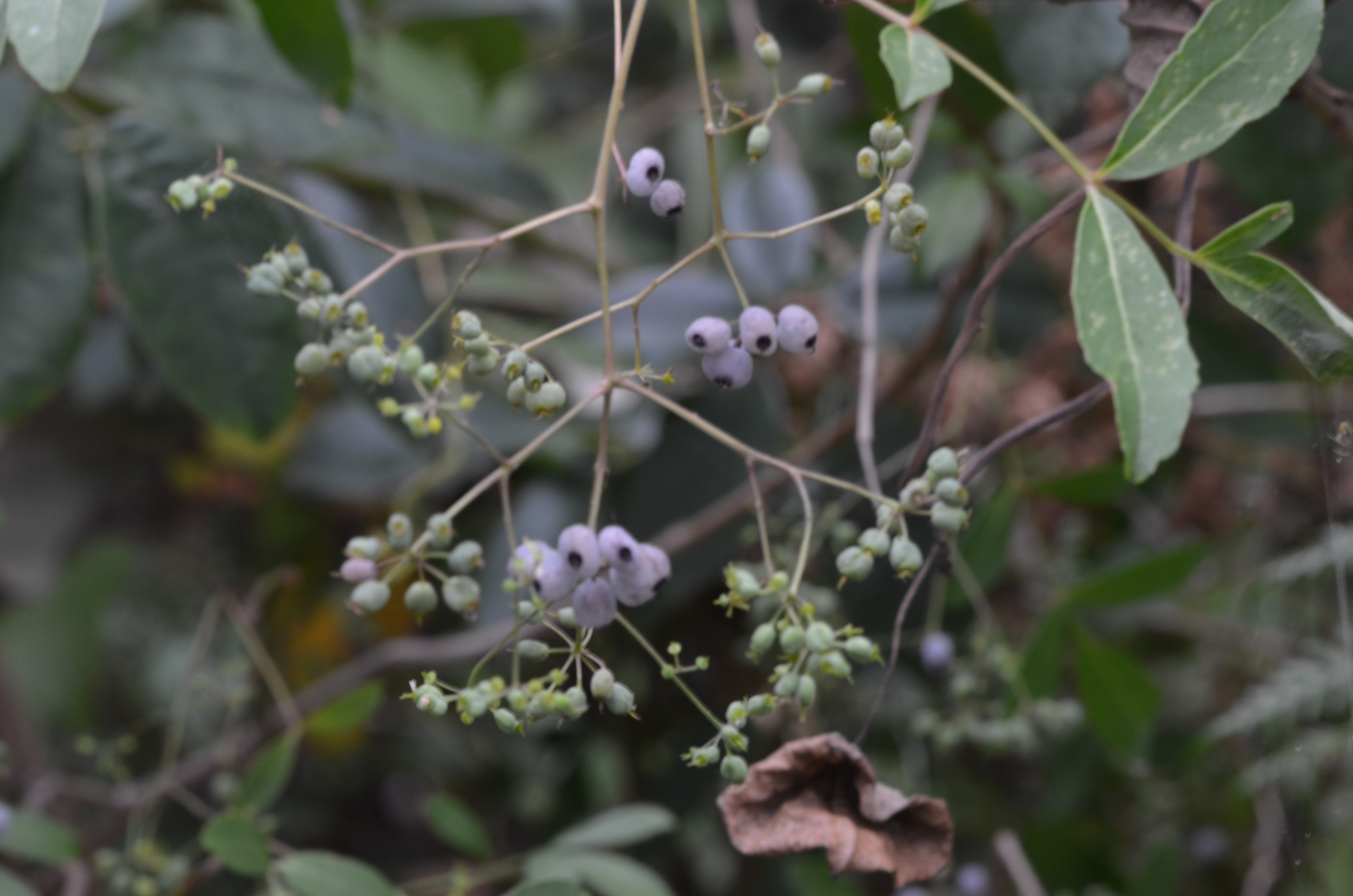
Polyscias sambucifolia

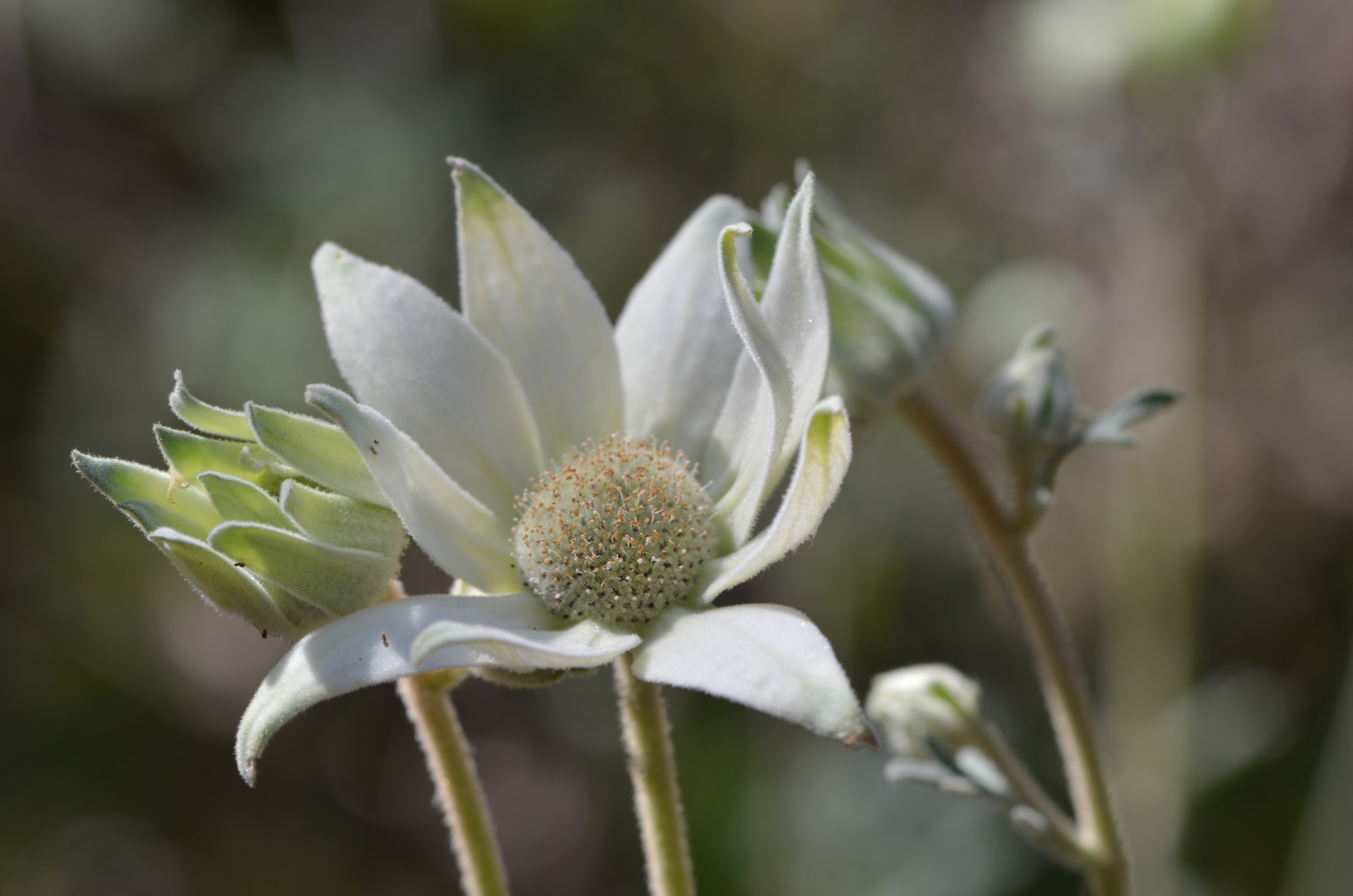
Actinotus helianthi

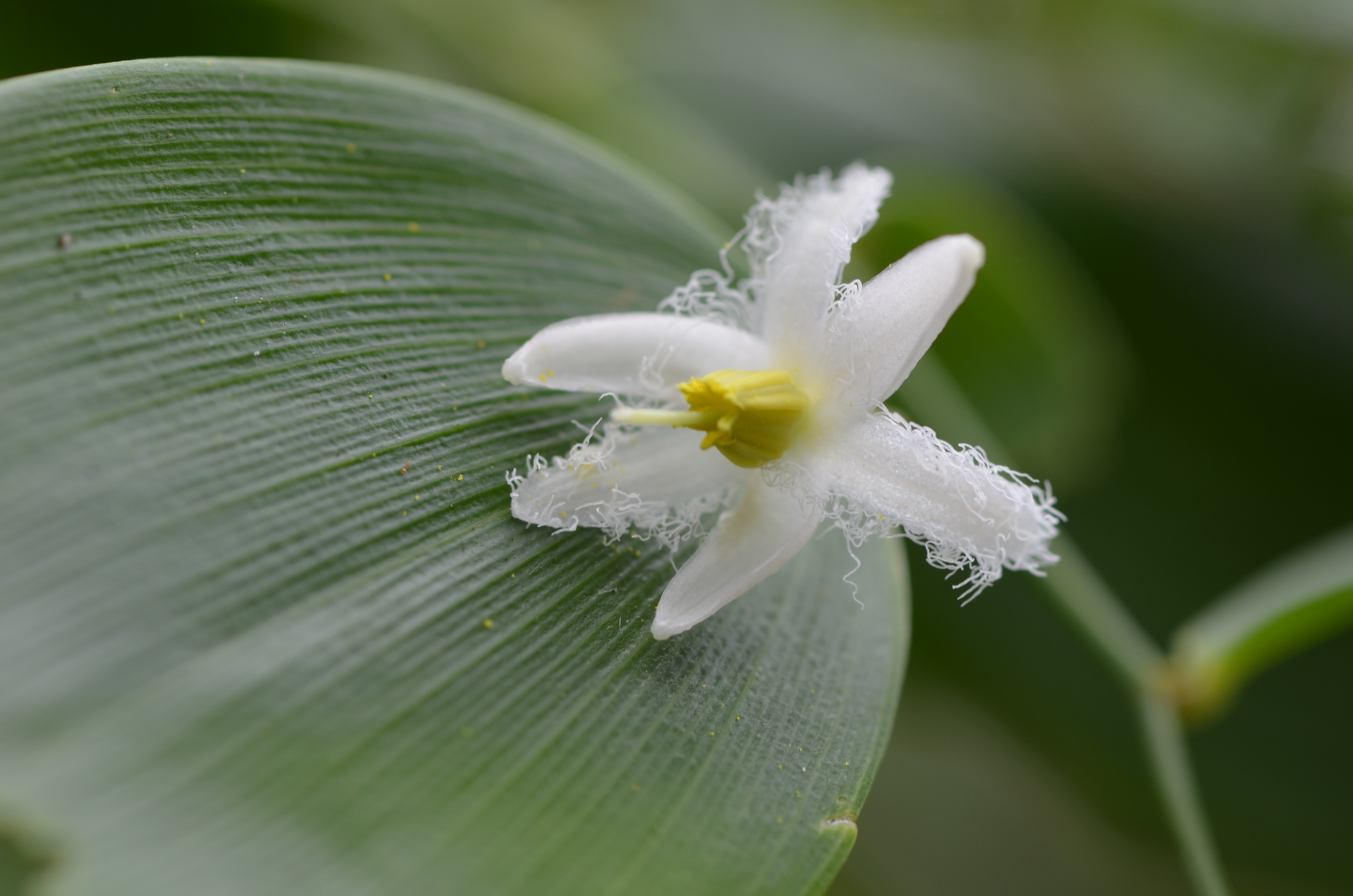
Eustrephus latifolius

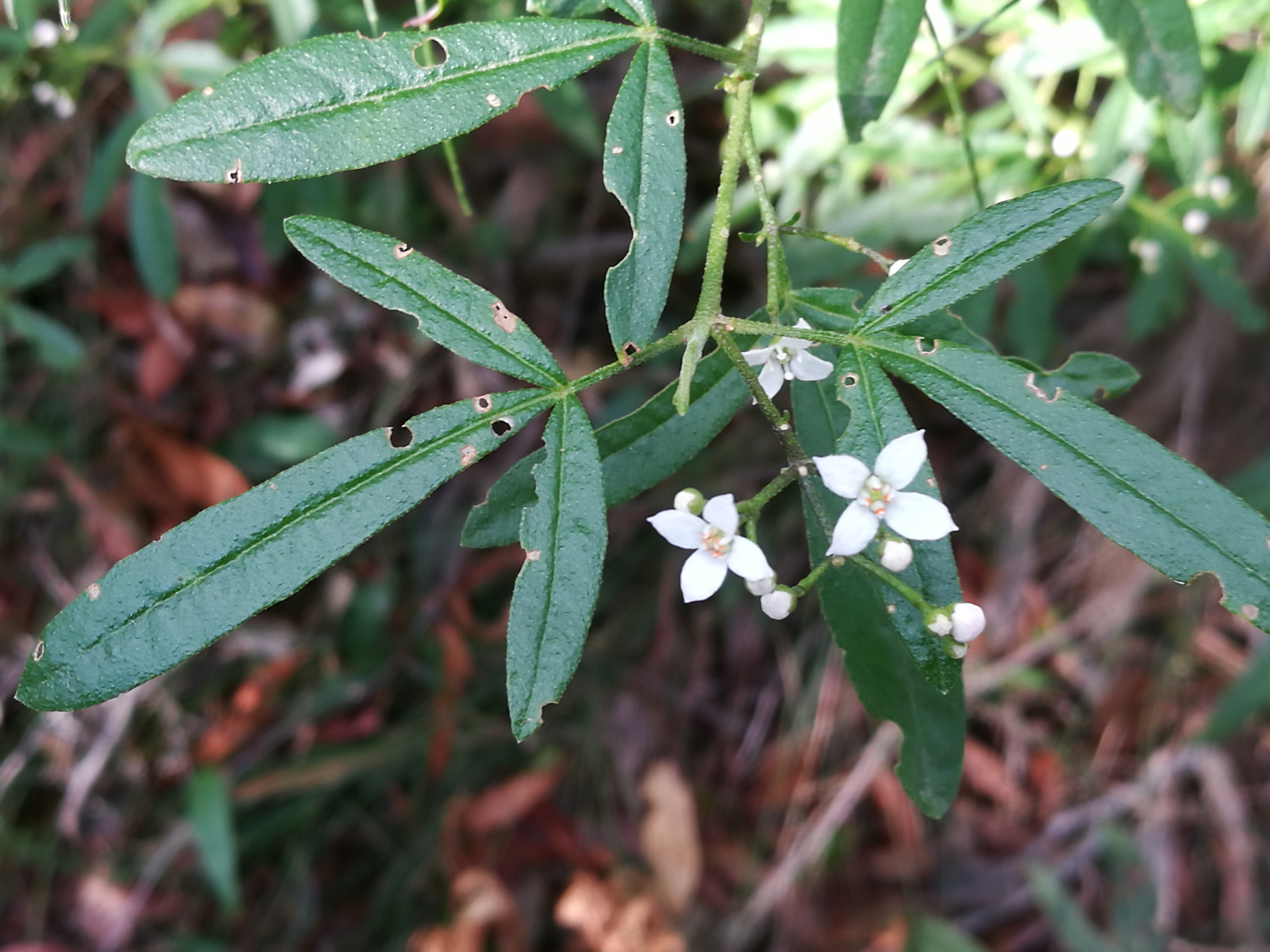
Zieria smithii

Flora found in McKay Reserve

1. Acacia elata
2. Acacia floribunda
3. Acacia linifolia
4. Acacia longifolia
5. Acacia myrtifolia
6. Acacia parramattensis
7. #Acacia saligna
8. Acacia suaveolens
9. Acacia terminalis
10. Acacia ulicifolia
11. *Acer negundo
12. Acianthus exsertus
13. Acianthus fornicatus
14. Acmena smithii
15. Acrotriche divaricata
16. Actinotus helianthi
17. Actinotus minor
18. Adiantum aethiopicum
19. Adiantum hispidulum
20. *Agapanthus orientalis
21. *Ageratina adenophora
22. *Ageratum houstonianum
23. Agrostis avenacea
24. Allocasuarina littoralis
25. Allocasuarina torulosa
26. #Alocasia brisbanensis
27. *Ammi majus
28. *Andropogon virginicus
29. Angophora costata
30. Angophora floribunda
31. Anisopogon avenaceus
32. Anredera cordifolia
33. Aotus ericoides
34. *Apium leptophyllum
35. Aristida vagans
36. Arthropodium milleflorum
37. *Arundo donax
38. *Asparagus aethiopicus
39. *Aster subulatus
40. Astrotricha latifolia
41. Axonopus affinis
42. *Bambusa sp.
43. Banksia ericifolia
44. Banksia integrifolia
45. Banksia oblongifolia
46. Banksia serrata
47. Banksia spinulosa
48. *Bidens pilosa
49. Billardiera scandens
50. Blandfordia nobilis
51. Blechnum cartilagineum
52. Breynia oblongifolia
53. *Briza maxima
54. *Briza minor
55. *Bromus catharticus
56. Brunoniella pumilio
57. Burchardia umbellata
58. #Callistemon viminalis
59. *Canna indica
60. *Cardamine hirsuta
61. Cassinia uncata
62. Cassytha glabella
63. Cassytha pubescens
64. Casuarina cunninghamiana
65. Cayratia clematidea
66. Centella asiatica
67. *Cerastium glomeratum
68. Ceratopetalum gummiferum
69. *Chenopodium album
70. *Chenopodium ambrosioides
71. *Chlorophytum comosum
72. *Chrysanthemoides monilifera
73. *Cinnamomum camphora
74. Cissus antarctica
75. Cissus hypoglauca
76. Clematis aristata
77. Clematis glycinoides
78. *Clivea sp.
79. Cloanthes stoechadis
80. Comesperma volubile
81. Commelina cyanea
82. Conospermum taxifolium
83. *Conyza albida
84. *Conyza bilbaoana
85. *Conyza bonariensis
86. *Conyza canadensis
87. *Conyza parva
88. *Coreopsis lanceolata
89. Correa reflexa
90. *Cortaderia selloana
92. Corybas sp.
93. Corymbia gummifera
94. Corymbia maculata
95. *Cotoneaster glaucophyllus
96. Cotula australis
97. *Crassocephalum crepidioides
98. Crassula sieberiana
99. Cristella dentata
100. *Crocosmia X crocosmiiflora
101. Cryptocarya glaucescens
102. Cryptostylis erecta
103. Cryptostylis subulata
104. Cyathea cooperi
105. Cyathochaeta diandra
106. Cymbopogon refractus
107. *Cynodon dactylon
108. *Cyperus brevifolius
109. *Cyperus eragrostis
110. Dampiera stricta
111. Danthonia tenuior
112. Davallia pyxidata
113. Daviesia umbellulata
114. Dendrobium linguiforme
115. Dendrobium speciosum
116. Desmodium rhytidophyllum
117. Desmodium varians
118. Deyeuxia quadriseta
119. Dianella caerulea
120. Dichondra repens
121. Digitaria parviflora
122. *Digitaria sanguinalis
123. Dillwynia retorta
124. Dodonaea triquetra
125. Doodia aspera
126. Drosera auriculata
127. Echinopogon caespitosus
128. *Ehrharta erecta
129. Elaeocarpus reticulatus
130. Eleusine indica
131. Endiandra sieberi
132. Entolasia marginata
133. Entolasia stricta
134. Epacris longiflora
135. Epacris microphylla
136. Epacris pulchella
137. *Epidendrum
138. Epilobium billardierianum
139. Eragrostis brownii
140. *Erechtites valerianifolia
141. *Erythrina x sykesii
142. Eucalyptus botryoides
143. Eucalyptus haemastoma
144. Eucalyptus paniculata
145. Eucalyptus piperita
146. Eucalyptus punctata
147. Eucalyptus scias
148. Eucalyptus umbra
149. *Euphorbia peplus
150. Eupomatia laurina
151. Eustrephus latifolius
152. Ficus rubiginosa
153. *Fumaria sp.
154. Gahnia clarkei
155. *Galinsoga parviflora
156. Geitonoplesium cymosum
157. *Genista stenopetala
158. Geranium homeanum
159. Glochidion ferdinandi
160. Glycine clandestina
161. *Gnaphalium sp.
162. Gompholobium latifolium
163. Gonocarpus teucrioides
164. Goodenia bellidifolia
165. Goodenia heterophylla
166. Grevillea linearifolia
167. Grevillea sericea
168. Hakea gibbosa
169. Hakea salicifolia
170. Hakea sericea
171. Hakea teretifolia
172. Hardenbergia violacea
173. *Hedera helix
174. Hibbertia aspera
175. Hibbertia dentata
176. Hibbertia empetrifolia
177. Hibbertia obtusifolia
178. Histiopteris incisa
179. Homalanthus populifolius
180. Hybanthus monopetalus
181. *Hydrocotyle bonariensis
182. Hydrocotyle peduncularis
183. *Impatiens sultanii
184. Imperata cylindrica
185. *Ipomoea indica
186. Isolepis nodosus
187. Isopogon anemonifolius
188. *Jasminum polyanthum
189. *Juncus cognatus
190. Juncus usitatus
191. Kennedia rubicunda
192. Kunzea ambigua
193. *Lagenifera stipitata
194. Lambertia formosa
195. *Lantana camara
196. *Lantana X hybrida
197. Lasiopetalum ferrugineum
198. Leichhardtia suaveolens (syn. Marsdenia suaveolens)
199. Lepidosperma laterale
200. Lepidosperma neesii
201. Leptospermum polygalifolium
202. Leptospermum trinervium
203. Lepyrodia scariosa
204. Leucopogon juniperinus
205. Leucopogon microphyllus
206. *Ligustrum lucidum
207. *Ligustrum sinense
208. *Lilium formosanum
209. Lindsaea linearis
210. Lindsaea microphylla
211. Livistona australis
212. Lobelia anceps
213. Lomandra cylindrica
214. Lomandra glauca
215. Lomandra gracilis
216. Lomandra longifolia
217. Lomandra multiflora
218. Lomandra obliqua
219. Lomatia silaifolia
220. *Lonicera japonica
221. *Lycopersicon esculentum
222. Macrozamia communis
223. *Medicago polymorpha
224. Melichrus procumbens
225. Microlaena stipoides
226. Mirbelia rubiifolia
227. Mitrasacme polymorpha
228. Monotoca elliptica
229. Morinda jasminoides
230. Musa sp.
231. Myrsine variabilis
232. *Nephrolepis cordifolia
233. Notelaea longifolia
234. *Nothoscordum gracile
235. *Ochna serrulata
236. *Oenothera stricta
237. Olearia tomentosa
238. Opercularia aspera
239. Oplismenus aemulus
240. Oplismenus imbecillis
241. *Oxalis corniculata
242. *Oxalis latifolia
243. *Oxalis pes-caprae
244. Pandorea pandorana
245. Panicum simile
246. Pararchidendron pruinosum
247. *Paraserianthes lophantha
248. Parsonsia straminea
249. *Paspalidium sp. (synonyms in Setaria)
250. *Paspalum dilatatum
251. *Paspalum urvillei
252. *Passiflora edulis
253. Patersonia glabrata
254. Patersonia sericea
255. Pelargonium inodorum
256. *Pennisetum clandestinum
257. Persoonia lanceolata
258. Persoonia levis
259. Persoonia pinifolia
260. Petrophile pulchella
261. *Petrorhagia velutina
262. *Philodendron sp.
263. *Phoenix canariensis
264. Phyllanthus hirtellus
265. *Physalis peruviana
266. *Phytolacca octandra
267. Pimelea linifolia
268. Pittosporum multiflorum
269. Pittosporum revolutum
270. Pittosporum undulatum
271. *Plantago lanceolata
272. *Platanus x hybrida
273. Platylobium formosum
274. Platysace linearifolia
275. Plectranthus parviflorus
276. Poa affinis
277. *Poa annua
278. Podolobium ilicifolium
279. Polyscias sambucifolia
280. Pomaderris ferruginea
281. Pomax umbellata
282. Pratia purpurascens
283. Prostanthera denticulata
284. *Prunus cerasus
285. *Prunus persica
286. Pseuderanthemum variabile
287. Pteridium esculentum
288. Pterostylis longifolia
289. Pterostylis nutans
290. Ptilothrix deusta
291. Pultenaea daphnoides
292. Pultenaea flexilis
293. Pultenaea tuberculata
294. *Pyracantha angustifolia
295. Pyrrosia rupestris
296. *Ranunculus repens
297. *Rhaphiolepis indica
298. *Rhynchelytrum repens
299. *Romulea rosea
300. *Rubus fruticosus
301. *Rumex crispus
302. *Rumex sagittatus
303. *Salix babylonica
304. Scaevola calendulacea
305. Scaevola ramosissima
306. Schelhamera undulata
307. *Schlefflera actinophylla
308. Schoenus melanostachys
309. Selaginella uliginosa
310. *Senecio madagascariensis
311. *Senna pendula
312. *Setaria gracilis
313. *Setaria plamifolia
314. *Setaria pumila
315. *Setaria verticillata
316. *Sida rhombifolia
317. Smilax glyciphylla
318. *Solanum americanum
319. *Solanum mauritianum
320. *Solanum nigrum
321. *Sonchus oleraceus
322. *Sporobolus indicus
323. *Stachys arvensis
324. *Stellaria media
325. Stephania japonica
326. Stipa pubescens
327. *Strelitzia reginae
328. Stylidium graminifolium
329. Syncarpia glomulerifera
330. Synoum glandulosum
331. *Tagetes minuta
332. *Taraxacum officinale
333. Tetragonia tetragonoides
334. *Tetrapanax papyrifer
335. Tetrarrhena juncea
336. Tetratheca ericifolia
337. Themeda australis
338. Thunbergia alata
339. Thysanotus tuberosus
340. Todea barbara
341. *Toxicodendron succedaneum
342. *Tradescantia albiflora
343. Trema aspera
344. *Trifolium repens
345. Tristaniopsis collina
346. Tropaeolum majus
347. Urtica incisa
348. *Verbena bonariensis
349. *Vicia sativa
350. *Vicia tetrasperma
351. Viola hederacea
352. Wahlenbergia gracilis
353. *Watsonia bulbillifera
354. Westringia fruticosa
355. Wilkiea huegeliana
356. Woollsia pungens
357. Xanthorrhoea arborea
358. Xanthorrhoea media
359. Xanthosia pilosa
360. Xanthosia tridentata
361. Xylomelum pyriforme
362. Zieria pilosa
363. Zieria smithii
