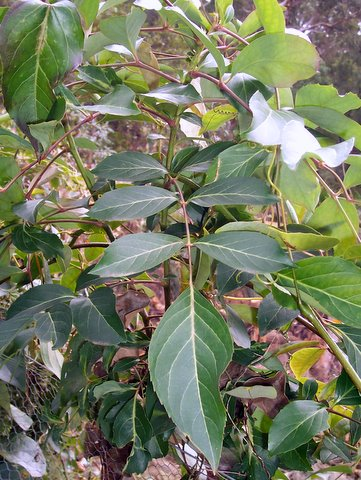
- Polyscias sambucifolia subsp. sambucifolia growing near Brisbane Water National Park, Australia
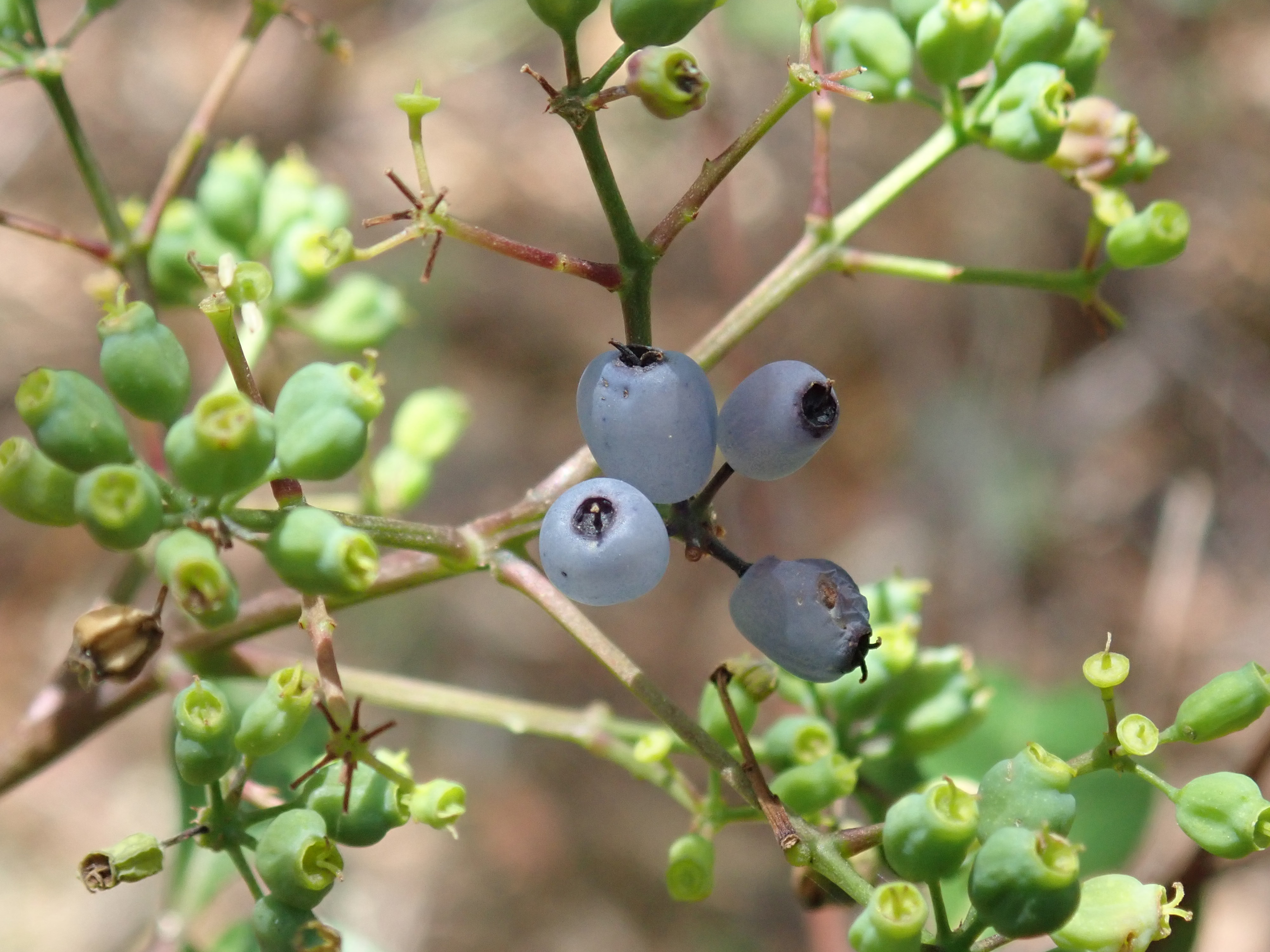
- Fruit (McKay Reserve, Palm Beach, New South Wales)

Scientific classification
- Kingdom: Plantae
- Clade: Tracheophytes
- Clade: Angiosperms
- Clade: Eudicots
- Clade: Asterids
- Order: Apiales
- Family: Araliaceae
- Genus: Polyscias
- Species: P. sambucifolia

Binomial name
- Polyscias sambucifolia Sieber ex DC. Harms

Synonyms
- Panax sambucifolius Sieber ex DC. Tieghemopanax sambucifolius

= Polyscias sambucifolia =

Species of tree

Polyscias sambucifolia, commonly known as elderberry panax or small basswood, is a species of plant native to eastern Australia.

== Taxonomy ==
Elderberry panax was first described by Franz Sieber in 1830 as Panax sambucifolius. It was given its current name in 1894 by German botanist Hermann Harms.

The taxonomy of the small basswood has been reviewed, resulting in the recognition of three sub species: sambucifolia, decomposita and leptophylla.

Common names for these plants include small basswood, elderberry panax, ornamental ash and elderberry ash.

== Description ==
Elderberry panax grows to 11 metres tall with a trunk diameter of 20 cm at Errinundra National Park and Otway National Park in the state of Victoria.

The trunk is straight. Bark is dark brown or black. Fairly smooth, marked by lenticles, pustules and lines.

=== Leaves ===
Leaf form varies between different sub forms of this plant. See Plant Net for detailed descriptions between the sub species.

Leaves are pinnate or bipinnate, with leaflets. Between one and six pairs of leaflets on the leaf stem. Leaflets of sub species sambucifolia are toothed, ovate in shape. The other sub species leaves are not toothed.

Leaflets 2 to 20 cm long. Leaves glossy green above, dull glaucous below. A terminal leaflet is seen on the end of the compound leaf.

Leaf stalks vary between 20 mm and no leaf stalk in sub species leptophylla. Leaf shape varies between ovate or elliptic to broad-elliptic in sub species sambucifolia. However the sessile leaflets of sub species leptophylla are oblong linear and somewhat curved (falcate) in shape. Leaf formation is two-pinnate or rarely three-pinnate in sub species decomposita.

Leaf veins evident on both the upper and lower surfaces. Sunken on the top of the leaf, raised below.

=== Flowers and fruit ===
The yellow/green flowers form on panicles from December to February. The fruit is an edible globose mericarp, 4 to 6 mm long and mauve or blue in colour. Each contains one or two seeds, 2 mm long. The fruit matures from January to April.

== Distribution and habitat ==
The natural range of distribution is from Cape Otway (38° S) in the state of Victoria to the McPherson Range (28° S), on the border of New South Wales and Queensland. It is often seen on the edge of rainforests.

== Ecology ==
The caterpillars of the elderberry panax leaf roller (Cryptoptila australana) eat the leaves, currawongs eat the fruit, dispersing the seeds afterwards. The species also regenerates from root suckers after bushfire, and suckering has been recorded at other times. It can colonise disturbed habitats.

== Uses ==
Elderberry panax has attractive foliage and fruit.
