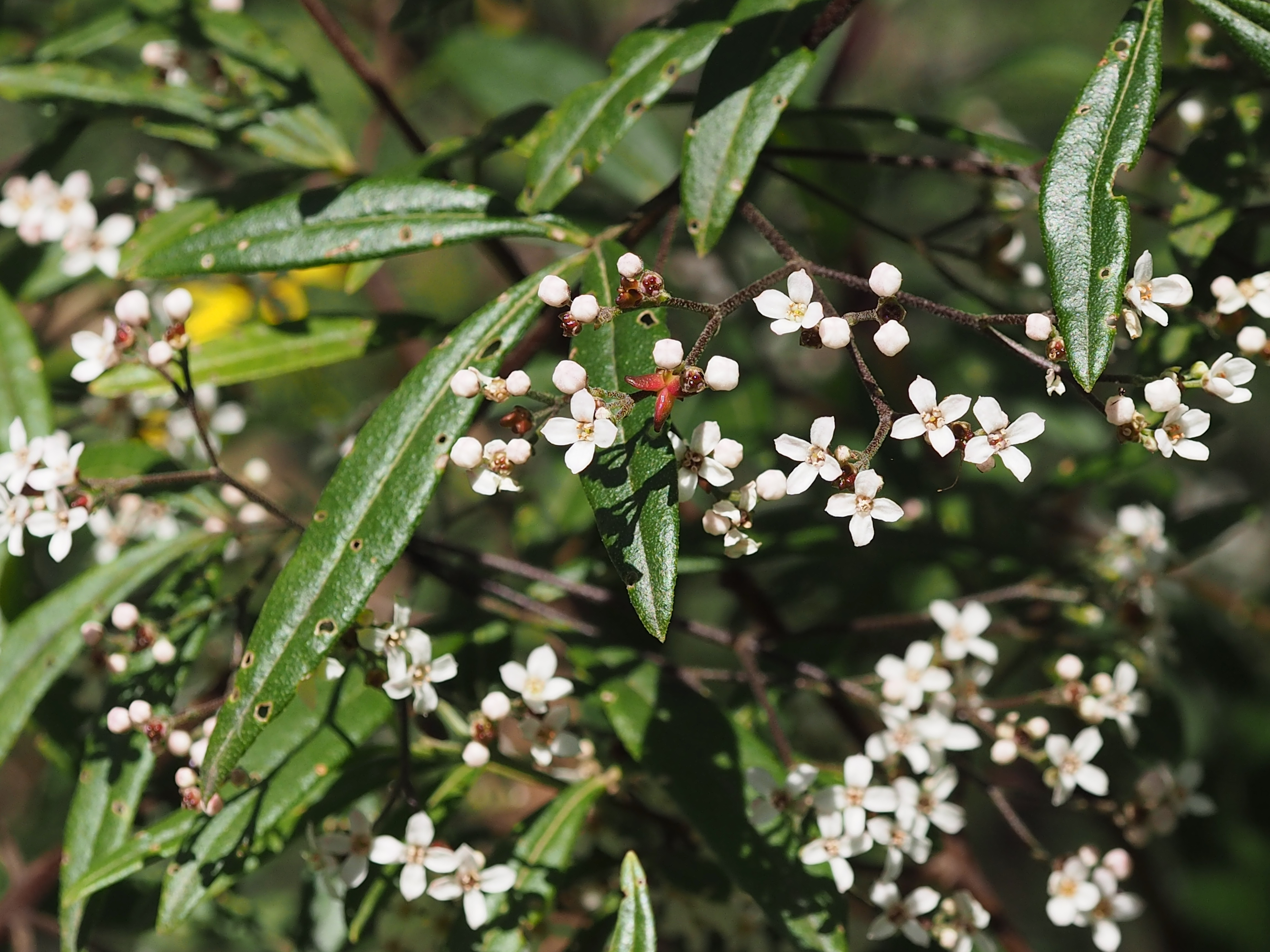
- Near the Gibraltar Range National Park

Scientific classification
- Kingdom: Plantae
- Clade: Tracheophytes
- Clade: Angiosperms
- Clade: Eudicots
- Clade: Rosids
- Order: Sapindales
- Family: Rutaceae
- Genus: Zieria
- Species: Z. smithii

Binomial name
- Zieria smithii Jacks.

= Zieria smithii =

Sandfly zieria

Species of flowering plant

Zieria smithii, commonly known as sandfly zieria, lanoline bush or Smithian zieria, is a plant in the citrus family Rutaceae and is endemic to eastern and south-eastern Australia. It is a robust shrub with its leaves composed of three leaflets, and groups of flowers with four white petals, the groups usually shorter than the leaves. It is common and widespread along the coast and adjacent ranges.

== Description ==
Zieria smithii is a shrub which grows to a height of 1–2 m (3–7 ft) and is sometimes robust or at other times spindly. Its leaves are composed of three leaflets with the middle leaflet oblong to lance-shaped 20–45 mm (0.8–2 in) long, and 4–7 mm (0.2–0.3 in) wide with a pointed tip. The upper surface of the leaflets is a darker green than the lower side, dotted with oil glands and mostly glabrous. The leaf stalk is 10–20 mm (0.4–0.8 in) long and the leaves are strongly aromatic when crushed.

The flowers are usually white and are arranged in groups of up to 60 in upper leaf axils, the groups shorter than the leaves and each flower 6–7 mm (0.2–0.3 in) in diameter. There are four triangular sepal lobes about 1–1.5 mm (0.04–0.06 in) long. The four petals are 2–4 mm (0.08–0.2 in) long and slightly hairy. In common with other zierias, there are only four stamens. Flowering occurs in autumn and spring and is followed by the fruit which is a capsule with three or four sections each containing one or two reddish brown to black striped seeds.

== Taxonomy and naming ==
Zieria smithii was first formally described in 1810 by George Jackson and the description was published in The Botanist's Repository for New, and Rare Plants. The specific epithet (smithii) honours James Edward Smith who established the genus Zieria.

== Distribution and habitat ==
This zieria occurs in Queensland as far north as the Atherton Tableland, south through the Brigalow Belt, Scenic Rim and Northern Tablelands. It is widespread and common on the coast and ranges of New South Wales but less common in Victoria. It grows in a wide range of habitats but is most common on the edge of rainforest, often in rocky areas.
