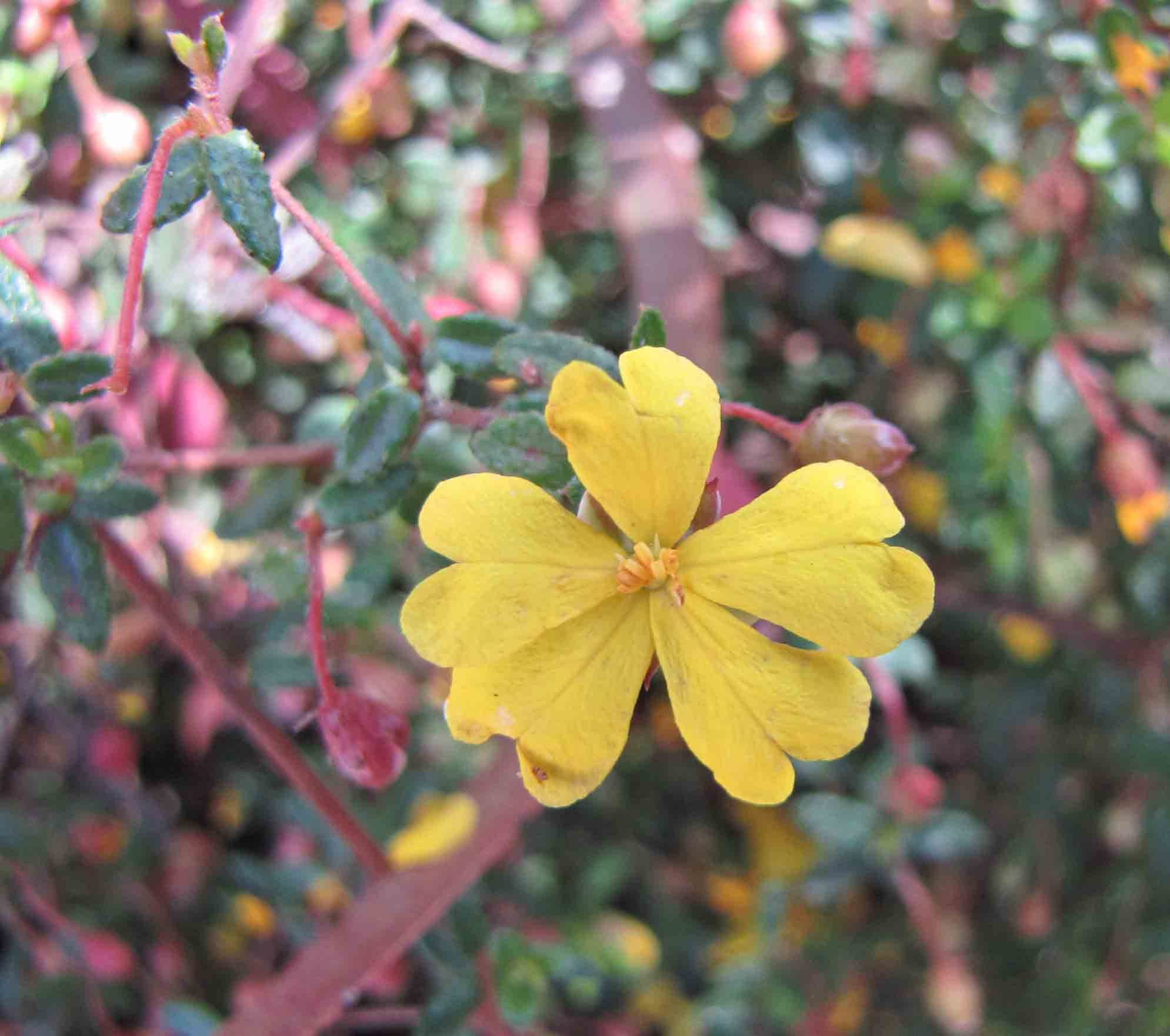
- In the ANBG

Scientific classification
- Kingdom: Plantae
- Clade: Tracheophytes
- Clade: Angiosperms
- Clade: Eudicots
- Order: Dilleniales
- Family: Dilleniaceae
- Genus: Hibbertia
- Species: H. empetrifolia

Binomial name
- Hibbertia empetrifolia (DC.) Hoogland

= Hibbertia empetrifolia =

Species of flowering plant

Hibbertia empetrifolia, commonly known as trailing guinea-flower, is a species of flowering plant in the family Dilleniaceae and is endemic to south-eastern Australia. It is a low-lying to spreading shrub with wiry stems, oblong to lance-shaped leaves with the narrower end towards the base, and pale to bright yellow flowers arranged on the ends of branchlets, with five to nine stamens arranged on one side of the two carpels.

== Description ==
Hibbertia empetrifolia is a low-lying to spreading shrub with trailing to wiry stems and that typically grows to a height of 60 cm (24 in). The leaves are oblong to lance-shaped with the narrower end towards the base, 5–7 mm (0.20–0.28 in) long and 1–3 mm (0.039–0.118 in) wide with the edges turned down or rolled under. Both surfaces of the leaves have simple, hooked or star-shaped hairs. The flowers are arranged singly on the ends of branchlets on a peduncle 2–10 mm (0.079–0.394 in) long. The sepals are 3–5 mm (0.12–0.20 in) long and the petals yellow and 3–6 mm (0.12–0.24 in) long. There are between five and nine stamens arranged on one side of the two carpels. Flowering occurs in most months.

== Taxonomy ==
This species was first formally described in 1817 by Swiss botanist Augustin Pyramus de Candolle in his book, Regni Vegetabilis Systema Naturale and was given the name Pleurandra empetrifolia. In 1974, Ruurd Dirk Hoogland changed the name to Hibbertia empetrifolia in the Kew Bulletin. The specific epithet (empetrifolia) refers to a similarity of the leaves to those in the genus Empetrum.

In 1998, Hellmut R. Toelken described three subspecies in the Journal of the Adelaide Botanic Gardens, and the names of two are accepted by the Australian Plant Census:

- Hibbertia empetrifolia (DC.) Hoogland subsp. empetrifolia;
- Hibbertia empetrifolia subsp. radians Toelken that differs from the autonym in having star-shaped hairs with fewer branches.

== Distribution and habitat ==
This guinea-flower occurs from south-east Queensland, through New South Wales and Victoria to Kangaroo Island in South Australia and in Tasmania. It grows in woodland and forest, scrambling over other vegetation. Subspecies empetrifolia is found on the coast and tablelands of New South Wales, coastal areas of Victoria east of Port Phillip Bay, the east coast of Tasmania. Subspecies radians only occurs in south-eastern South Australia.

== Use in horticulture ==
Hibbertia empetrifolia is regarded as one of the best suited species of Hibbertia for cultivation in gardens, preferring a well-drained situation with some shade. It is frost resistant and withstands some dryness, but performs best with adequate moisture.
