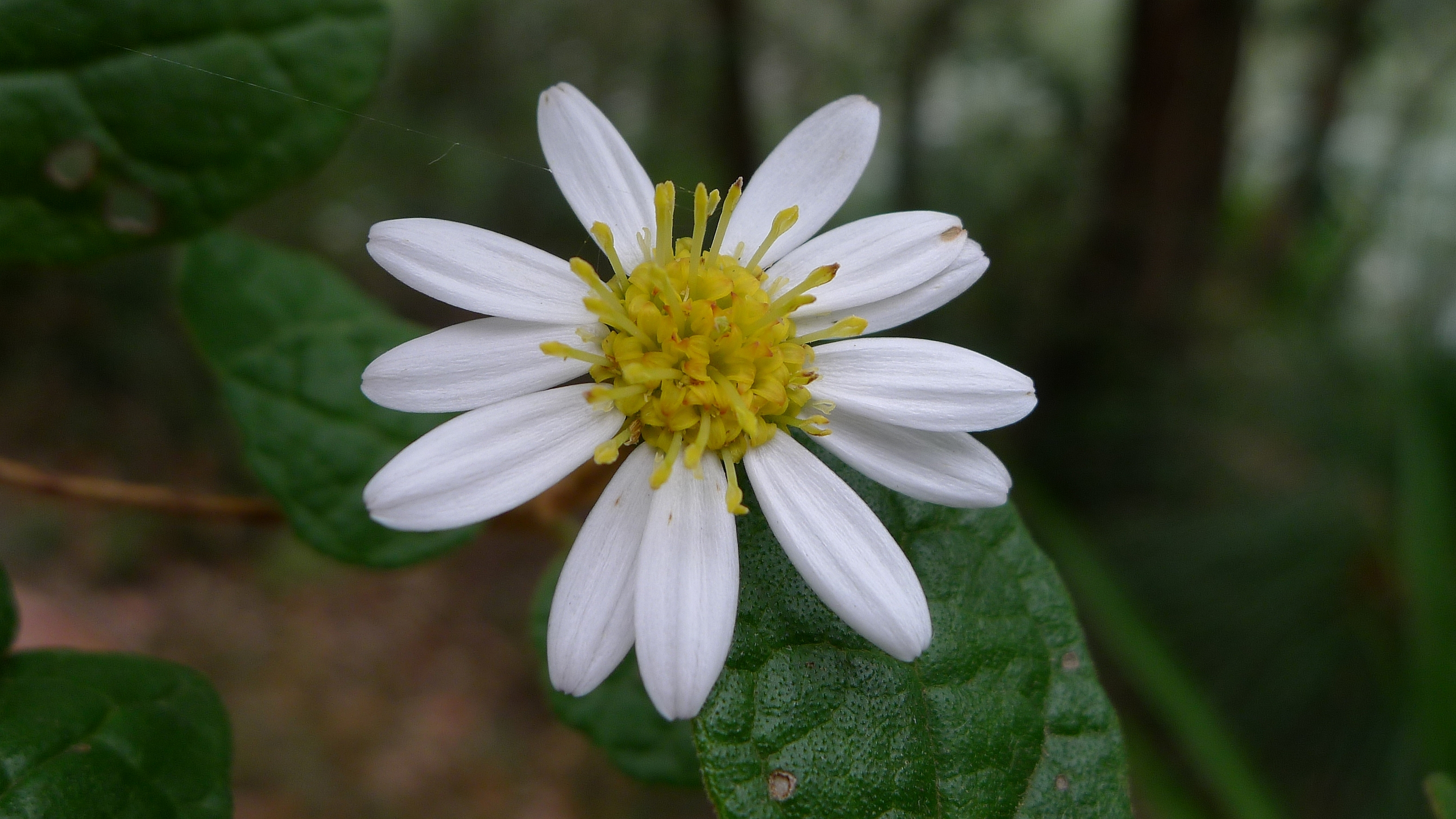

Scientific classification
- Kingdom: Plantae
- Clade: Tracheophytes
- Clade: Angiosperms
- Clade: Eudicots
- Clade: Asterids
- Order: Asterales
- Family: Asteraceae
- Genus: Olearia
- Species: O. tomentosa

Binomial name
- Olearia tomentosa (J.C.Wendl.) DC.

Synonyms
- List: Aster dentatus Andrews; Aster ferrugineus H.L.Wendl. nom. illeg.; Aster tomentosus J.C.Wendl.; Diplopappus rotundifolius Less.; Eurybia chrysotrycha Ten.; Eurybia dentata F.Muell. nom. illeg.; Olearia dentata Moench nom. illeg.; Olearia rotundifolia (Less.) DC.; Orestion dentata (Andrews) Raf. nom. superfl.; Shawia chrysotricha (Ten.) Sch.Bip.

= Olearia tomentosa =

Species of shrub

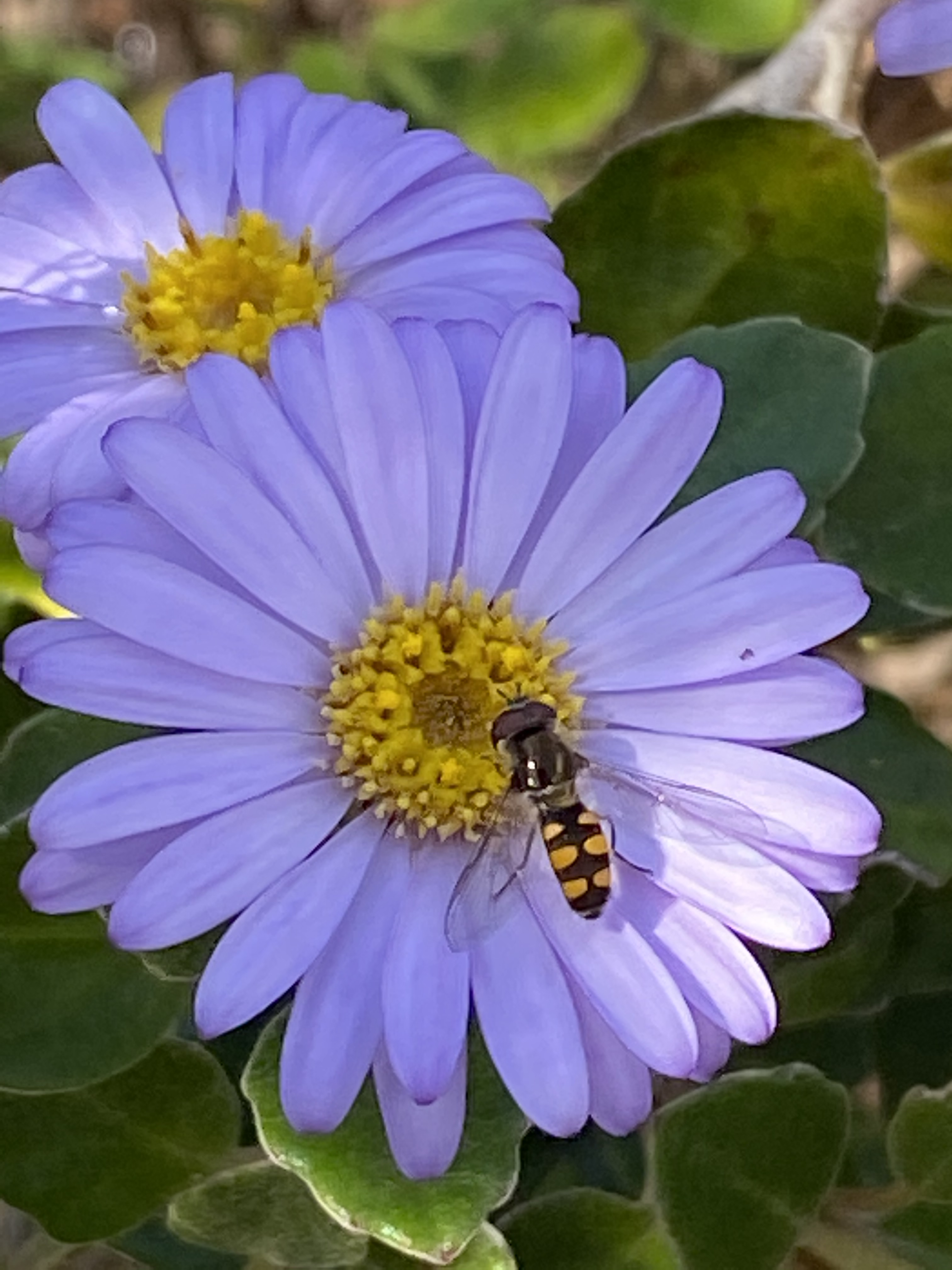
Mauve form

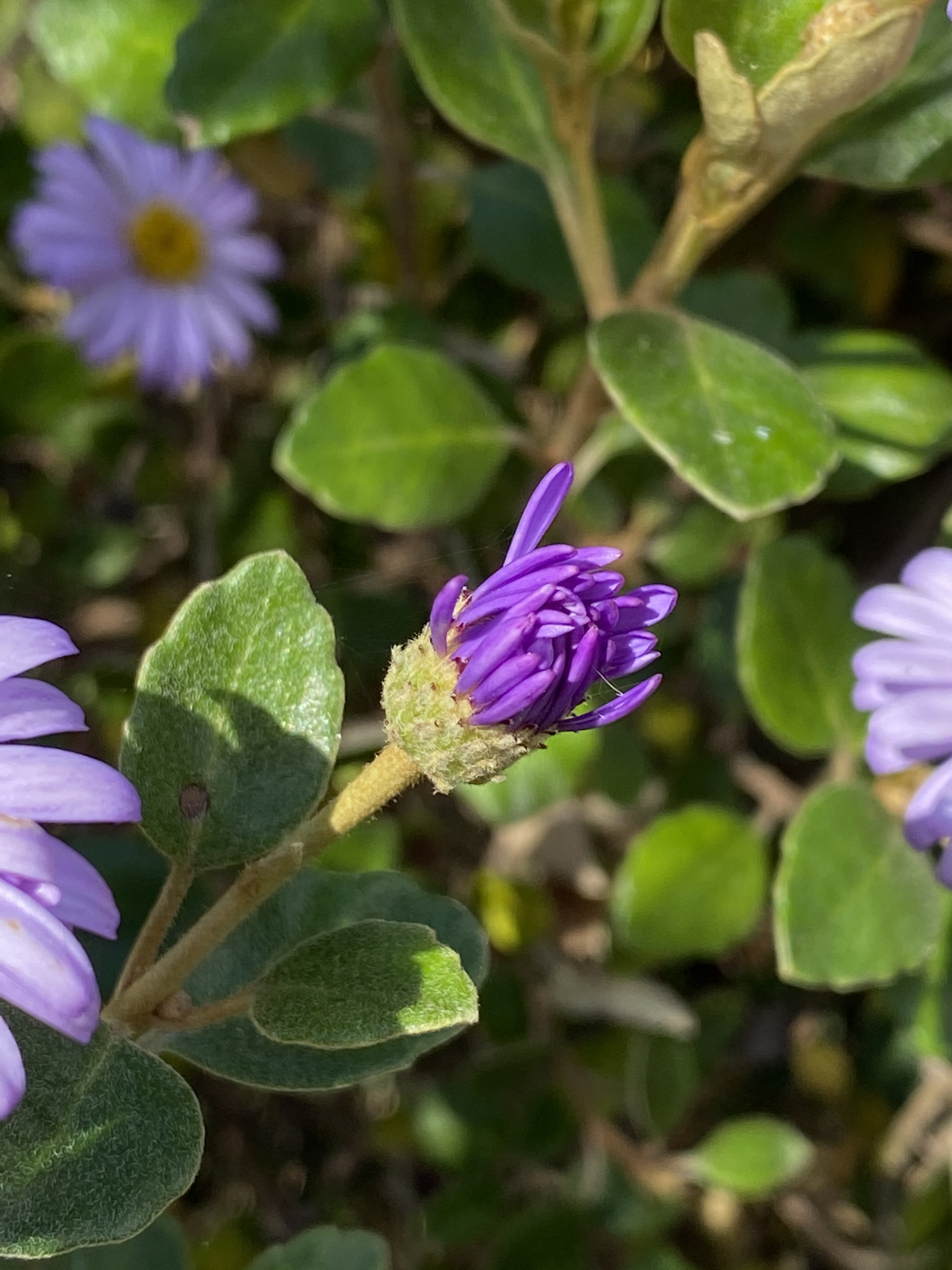
Flower buds and foliage

Olearia tomentosa, commonly known as the toothed daisy-bush, is a species of flowering plant in the family Asteraceae and is endemic to south-eastern continental Australia. It is a spreading shrub with egg-shaped leaves, the edges toothed or lobed, and blue or white and yellow, daisy-like inflorescences.

== Description ==
Olearia tomentosa is a spreading shrub that typically grows to a height of up to about 2 m (6 ft 7 in) and has its branchlets densely covered with rust-coloured hairs. The leaves are arranged alternately along the stems, egg-shaped, 10–85 mm (0.39–3.35 in) long, 9–50 mm (0.35–1.97 in) wide on a petiole up to 15 mm (0.59 in) long. The edges of the leaves are toothed of lobed, the lower surface densely hairy. The heads or daisy-like "flowers" are arranged singly or in small groups on a peduncle up to 70 mm (2.8 in) long, each head 25–59 mm (0.98–2.32 in) in diameter with a bell-shaped involucre 7–10 mm (0.28–0.39 in) long at the base. Each head has 12 to 33 white or blue ray florets, the ligule 12–25 mm (0.47–0.98 in) long, surrounding 30 to 90 yellow disc florets. Flowering mainly occurs from September to December and the fruit is a ribbed achene about 4 mm (0.16 in) long, the pappus 7–9 mm (0.28–0.35 in) long.

== Taxonomy ==
This daisy was described in 1798 by German botanist Johann Christoph Wendland who gave it the name Aster tomentosus. In 1836, Augustin Pyramus de Candolle changed the name to Olearia tomentosa. The specific epithet (tomentosa) means "covered with matted hairs", referring to the underside of the leaves. It is the type species of the genus, and was placed in the section Dicerotriche, yet genetically is sister to the section Asterotriche.

== Distribution and habitat ==
Toothed daisy-bush is found south of the Hastings River and inland as far as the Blue Mountains in eastern New South Wales, and east of Mallacoota Inlet in the far east of Victoria. It grows on sandstone-based soils in dry sclerophyll forest and heath.

== Ecology ==
Olearia tomentosa plants are generally killed by bushfire, though there are reports of plants regrowing from suckers after fire.

== Use in horticulture ==
Not commonly seen in cultivation, O. tomentosa grows in soil with good drainage in a sunny or part-shaded location. Regular pruning prevents the plant from becoming leggy, and can rejuvenate older plants. The species is moderately frost-hardy.
