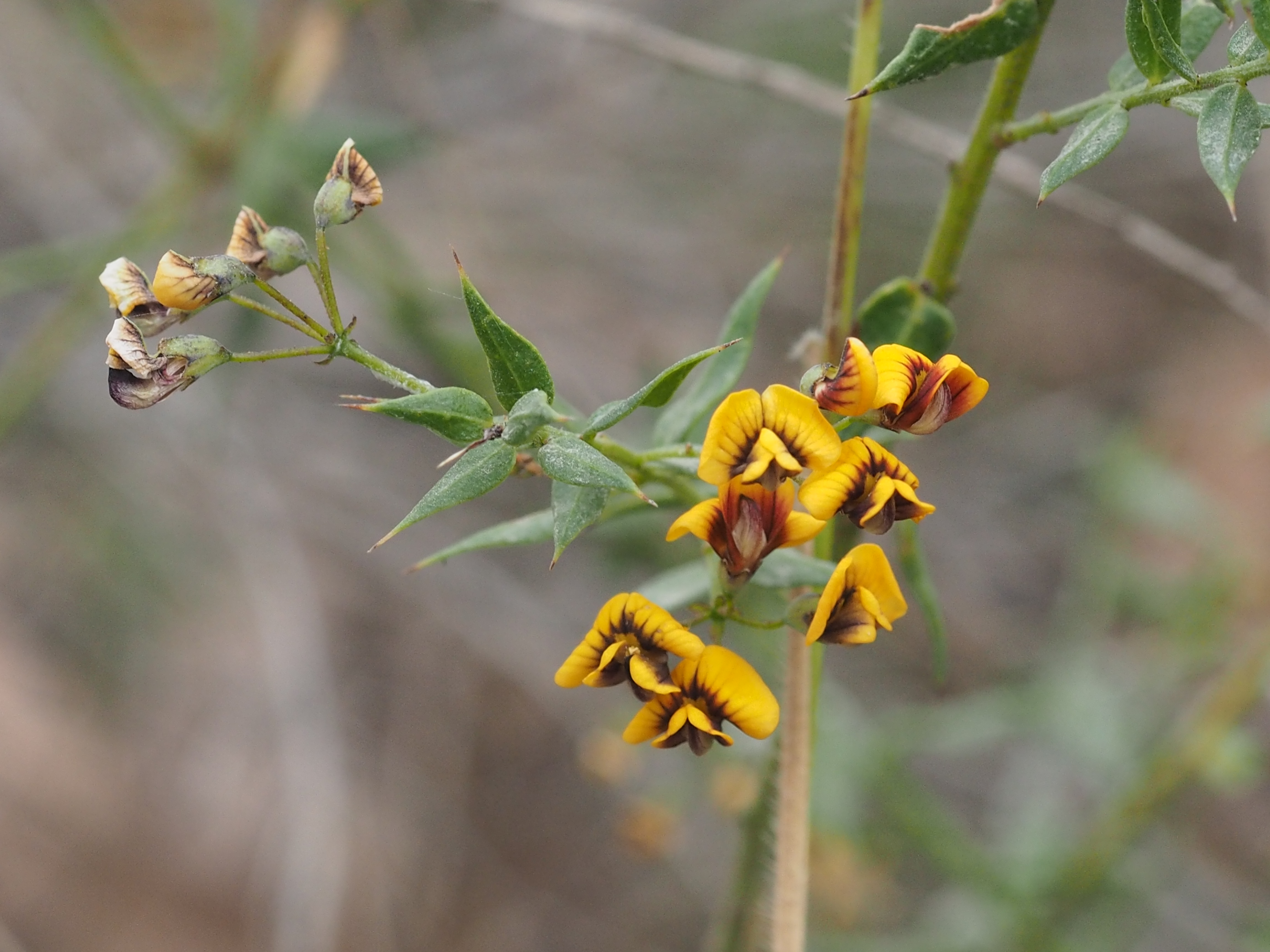
- Near Corindi

Scientific classification
- Kingdom: Plantae
- Clade: Tracheophytes
- Clade: Angiosperms
- Clade: Eudicots
- Clade: Rosids
- Order: Fabales
- Family: Fabaceae
- Subfamily: Faboideae
- Genus: Daviesia
- Species: D. umbellulata

Binomial name
- Daviesia umbellulata Sm.

= Daviesia umbellulata =

Species of flowering plant

Daviesia umbellulata is a species of flowering plant in the family Fabaceae and is endemic to eastern Australia. It is a slender shrub with egg-shaped or linear phyllodes, and groups of up to six yellow to orange flowers with maroon markings.

== Description ==
Daviesia umbellulata is a slender shrub that typically grows to a height of 0.3–1 m (1 ft 0 in – 3 ft 3 in) and has ribbed branchlets. The phyllodes are egg-shaped to linear, sometimes with a heart-shaped base, 7–30 mm (0.28–1.18 in) long and 0.5–8 mm (0.020–0.315 in) wide with a sharply-pointed tip. The flowers are arranged in groups of three to six, the groups on a peduncle 3–50 mm (0.12–1.97 in) long, the individual flowers on pedicels 4–5.5 mm (0.16–0.22 in) long. The five sepals are 3.0–3.5 mm (0.12–0.14 in) long and joined at the base, the upper two joined in a single "lip" and the lower three less than 1 mm (0.039 in) long. The standard petal is egg-shaped with a central notch, yellow to orange with a dark maroon base and 5–7 mm (0.20–0.28 in) long, the wings yellow with a maroon base and 4.5–6.0 mm (0.18–0.24 in) long, and the keel is maroon and 4.0–4.5 mm (0.16–0.18 in) long. Flowering occurs from August to November and the fruit is a triangular pod 8–9 mm (0.31–0.35 in) long.

== Taxonomy and naming ==
Daviesia umbellulata was first formally described in 1880 by James Edward Smith in the Annals of Botany from specimens collected at Port Jackson. The specific epithet (umbellulata) means "umbel-like".

== Distribution ==
This bitter-pea grows in the understorey of open forest, woodland or heath and mainly occurs near the coast between Shoalwater Bay in Queensland and Sydney, New South Wales with a disjunct population near Torrington.
