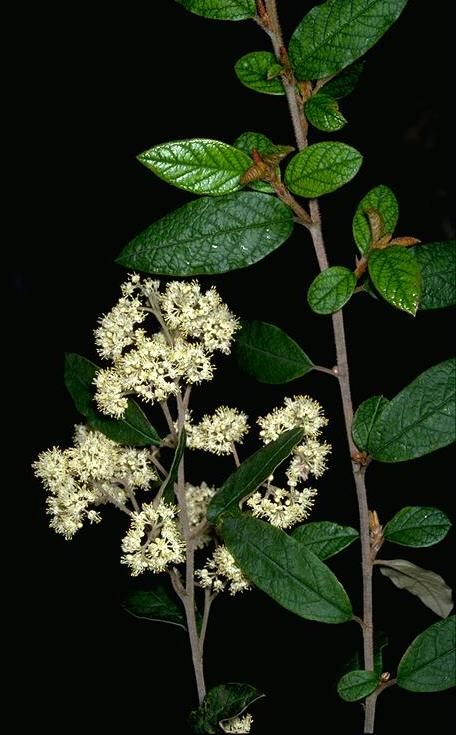
- Pomaderris ferruginea in the Australian National Botanic Gardens

Scientific classification
- Kingdom: Plantae
- Clade: Tracheophytes
- Clade: Angiosperms
- Clade: Eudicots
- Clade: Rosids
- Order: Rosales
- Family: Rhamnaceae
- Genus: Pomaderris
- Species: P. ferruginea

Binomial name
- Pomaderris ferruginea Sieber ex Fenzl

Synonyms
- Ceanothus wendlandianus Schult.; Pomaderris elliptica var. ferruginea (Sieber ex Fenzl) C.Moore; Pomaderris ferruginea DC. nom. inval., pro syn.; Pomaderris ferruginea Sieber ex Fenzl var. ferruginea; Pomaderris viridirufa DC. nom. inval., pro syn.; Pomaderris viridirufa Fenzl nom. inval., pro syn.; Pomaderris wendlandiana (Schult.) G.Don; Trymalium wendlandianum (Schult.) G.Don

= Pomaderris ferruginea =

Rusty pomaderris

Species of shrub

Pomaderris ferruginea, commonly known as rusty pomaderris, is a species of flowering plant in the family Rhamnaceae and is endemic to south-eastern continental Australia. It is a shrub with rusty-hairy stems, egg-shaped leaves, and clusters of cream-coloured, whitish or yellow flowers.

== Description ==
Pomaderris ferruginea is a shrub that typically grows to a height of 1.5–4 m (4 ft 11 in – 13 ft 1 in), its branchlets covered with shaggy, rust-coloured hairs. The leaves are egg-shaped or narrowly egg-shaped, 30–90 mm (1.2–3.5 in) long and 15–40 mm (0.59–1.57 in) wide, the upper surface glabrous and the lower surface covered with curved, rust-coloured hairs. The flowers are cream-coloured and borne in pyramid-shaped to hemispherical panicles 30–100 mm (1.2–3.9 in) wide on the ends of branches, each flower on a pedicel 1.5–4 mm (0.059–0.157 in) long with bracts at the base but that fall off as the flower opens. The floral cup is 1.0–1.5 mm (0.039–0.059 in) long, the sepals 1.5–2.5 mm (0.059–0.098 in) long but fall off as the flowers open, and the petals are 1–2 mm (0.039–0.079 in) long. Flowering occurs from August to October.

== Taxonomy ==
Pomaderris ferruginea was first formally described in 1837 by Eduard Fenzl in Enumeratio plantarum quas in Novae Hollandiae ora austro-occidentali ad fluvium Cygnorum et in sinu Regis Georgii collegit Carolus Liber Baro de Hügel from an unpublished description by Franz Sieber. The specific epithet (ferruginea) means "rust-coloured".

== Distribution and habitat ==
Rusty pomaderris grows in open forest, often along streams from south-east Queensland, along the coast and tablelands of New South Wales and as far east as Bairnsdale in Victoria.
