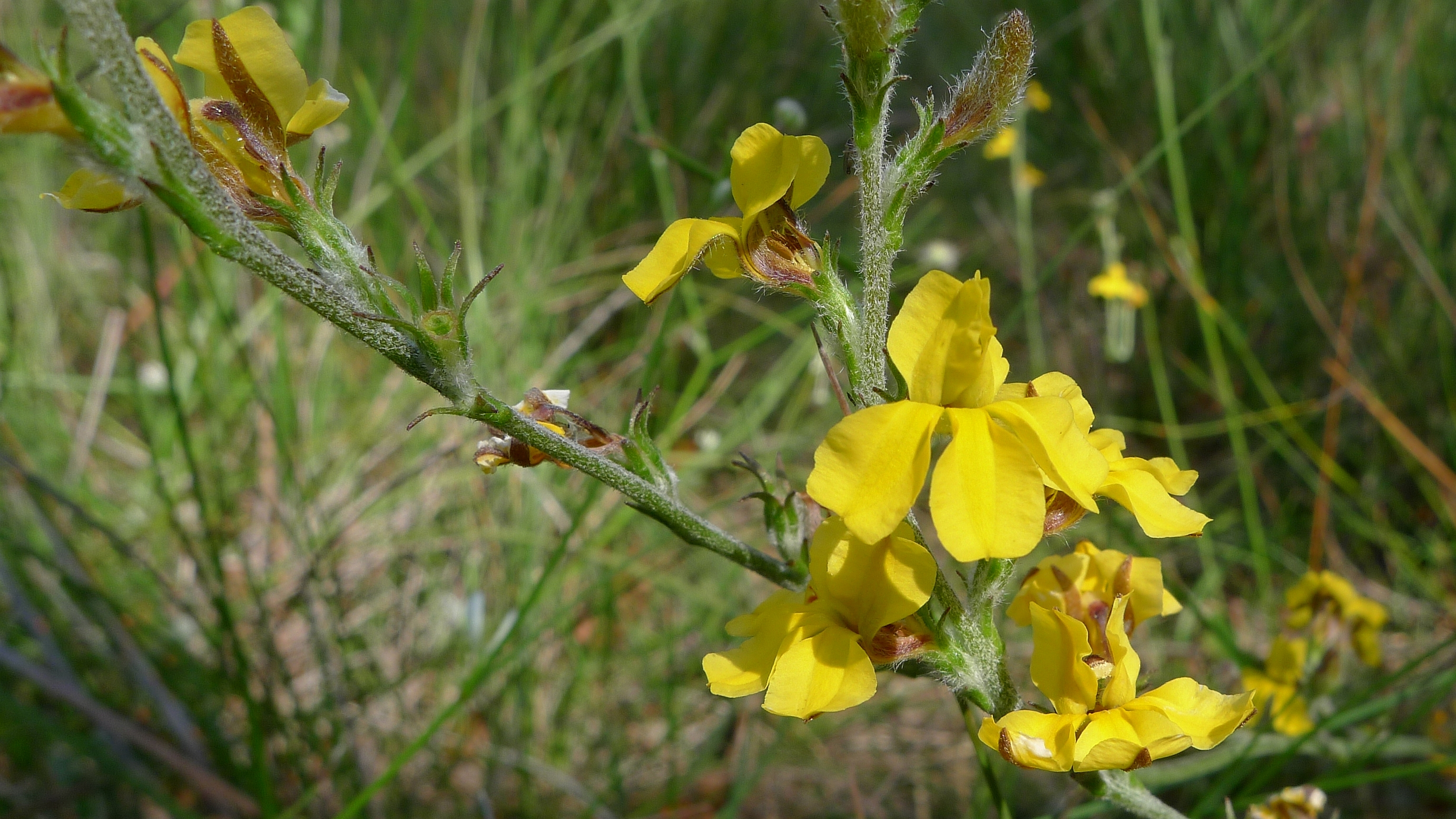
- Goodenia bellidifolia in Burnum Burnum Reserve, Jannali

Scientific classification
- Kingdom: Plantae
- Clade: Tracheophytes
- Clade: Angiosperms
- Clade: Eudicots
- Clade: Asterids
- Order: Asterales
- Family: Goodeniaceae
- Genus: Goodenia
- Species: G. bellidifolia

Binomial name
- Goodenia bellidifolia Sm.

Synonyms
- Goodenia bellidifolia var. ramosissima K.Krause; Goodenia spathulata de Vriese

= Goodenia bellidifolia =

Daisy goodenia

Species of plant

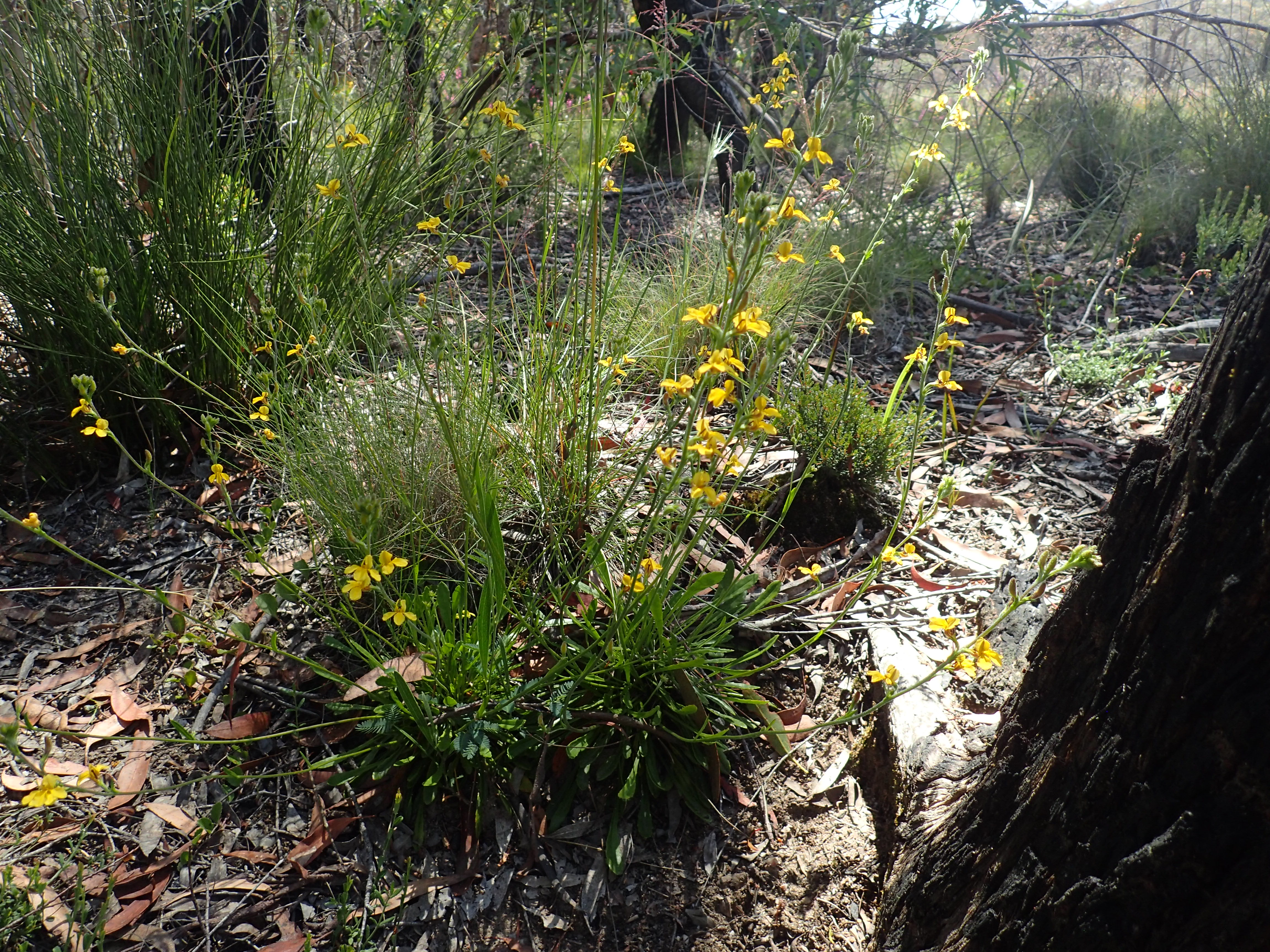
Habit in Cathedral Rock National Park

Goodenia bellidifolia, commonly known as daisy goodenia, is a species of flowering plant in the family Goodeniaceae and is endemic to eastern Australia. It is an erect, perennial herb with egg-shaped to lance-shaped leaves with the narrower end towards the base, spikes or thyrses of lemon-yellow to orange flowers, and oval to more or less spherical fruit.

== Description ==
Goodenia bellidifolia is an erect, perennial herb that typically grows to a height of 60 cm (24 in) and has glabrous to cottony-hairy stems. The leaves are egg-shaped to lance-shaped with the narrower end towards the base, sometimes with irregular teeth on the edges, 40–100 mm (1.6–3.9 in) long and 5–20 mm (0.20–0.79 in) wide. The flowers are arranged in spikes or thyrses up to 400 mm (16 in) long, sometimes on a pedicel up to 3 mm (0.12 in) long, with linear bracteoles about 3 mm (0.12 in) long at the base. The sepals are linear, 1.5–4 mm (0.059–0.157 in) long and the corolla is lemon-yellow to orange or yellow with cottony hairs on the back, up to 12 mm (0.47 in) long, the lower lobes of the corolla 2.5–4.5 mm (0.098–0.177 in) long with wings 1–1.5 mm (0.039–0.059 in) wide. Flowering occurs from August to March and the fruit is an oval to more or less spherical capsule about 4 mm (0.16 in) long.

== Taxonomy and naming ==
Goodenia bellidifolia was first formally described in 1794 by James Edward Smith in Transactions of the Linnean Society of London.

In 1981 Surrey Wilfrid Laurance Jacobs and J. Pickard described two subspecies, Goodenia belliodifolia subsp. A and the autonym Goodenia bellidifolia Sm. bellidifolia in Plants of New South Wales. In 1990, subspecies A was formalised as Goodenia bellidifolia subsp. argentea by Roger Charles Carolin in the journal Telopea and both names are accepted at the Australian Plant Census:

- Goodenia bellidifolia subsp. argentea Carolin has petals that are usually lemon-yellow with cottony white hairs on the back and more or less spherical fruit usually about 2 mm (0.079 in) long containing very dark brown to black seeds;
- Goodenia bellidifolia Carolin subsp. bellidifolia has petals that are usually orange to yellow with coarse yellow hairs on the back and oval fruit usually about 4 mm (0.16 in) long containing brown seeds.

== Distribution and habitat ==
Daisy goodenia grows in heath and forest from the Moreton and Wide Bay districts of Queensland, through eastern New South Wales and as far west as Dubbo to the Genoa area in the far north-east of Victoria. Subspecies argentea occurs in the northern part of the species' distribution, north from near Wingham and subspecies bellidifolia south from Glen Innes.
