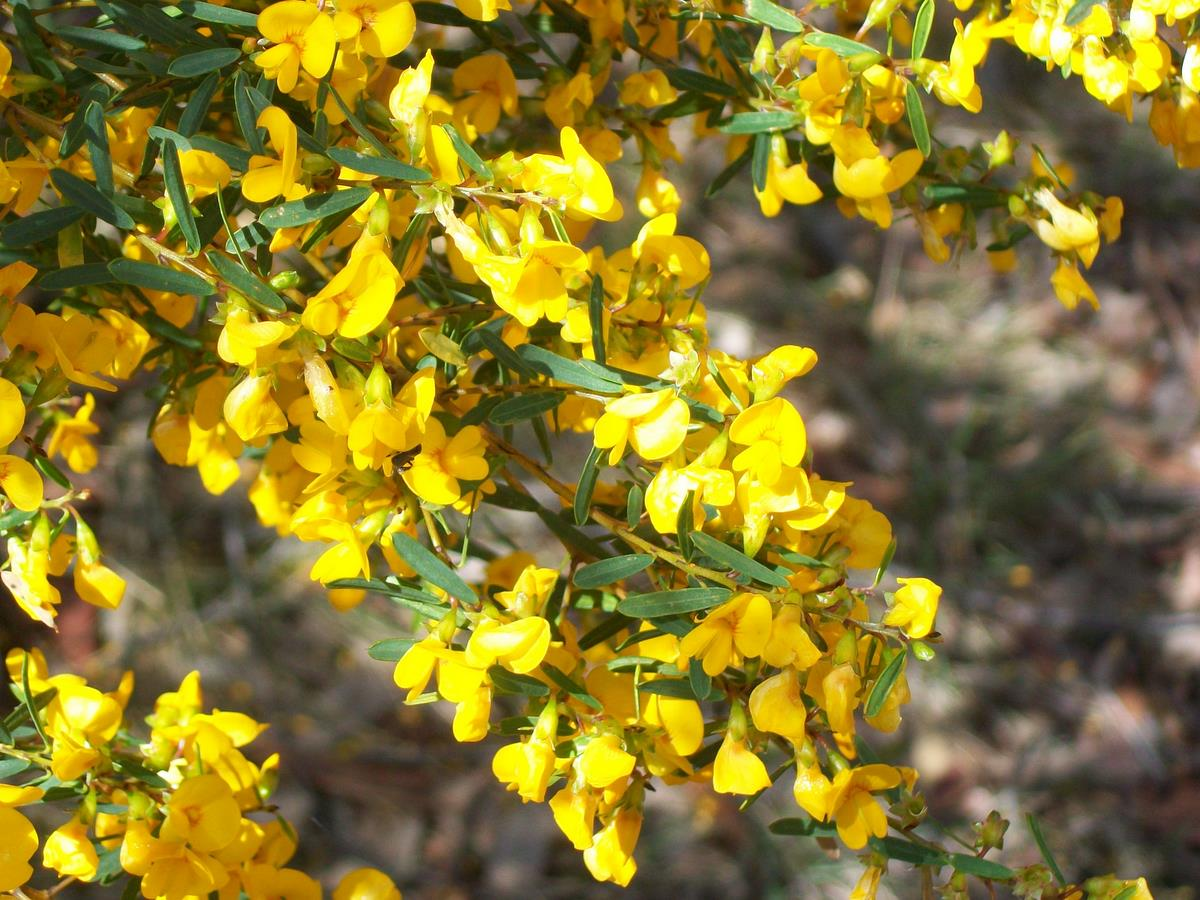
- In the Blue Mountains

Scientific classification
- Kingdom: Plantae
- Clade: Tracheophytes
- Clade: Angiosperms
- Clade: Eudicots
- Clade: Rosids
- Order: Fabales
- Family: Fabaceae
- Subfamily: Faboideae
- Genus: Pultenaea
- Species: P. flexilis

Binomial name
- Pultenaea flexilis Sm.

= Pultenaea flexilis =

Graceful bush-pea

Species of legume

Pultenaea flexilis known as the graceful bush-pea, is a species of flowering plant in the family Fabaceae and is endemic to eastern Australia. It is an erect shrub with linear to narrow egg-shaped leaves with the narrower end towards the base, and yellow to orange flowers with red markings.

== Description ==
Pultenaea flexilis is an erect shrub that typically grows to a height of up to 4 m (13 ft) and sometimes has sparsely hairy stems. The leaves are linear to narrow egg-shaped with the narrower end towards the base, 8–20 mm (0.31–0.79 in) long and 2–4 mm (0.079–0.157 in) wide with stipules 2–4 mm (0.079–0.157 in) long at the base and the lower surface darker than the upper. The flowers are arranged in clusters near the ends of branchlets and are 8–10 mm (0.31–0.39 in) long, each flower on a pedicel 2–5 mm (0.079–0.197 in) long. The sepals are 3–5 mm (0.12–0.20 in) long with papery linear bracteoles 1–3 mm (0.039–0.118 in) long near the base. The petals are yellow to orange sometimes with red markings. Flowering occurs from winter to spring and the fruit is a pod 6–9 mm (0.24–0.35 in) long.

== Taxonomy ==
Pultenaea flexilis was first formally described in 1805 by James Edward Smith in the journal Annals of Botany from specimens collected at Port Jackson. The specific epithet (flexilis) is a Latin word meaning "flexible", referring to the leaves.

== Distribution and habitat ==
Graceful bush-pea grows in forest on the coast and tablelands of south-east Queensland and New South Wales as far south as Deua National Park.
