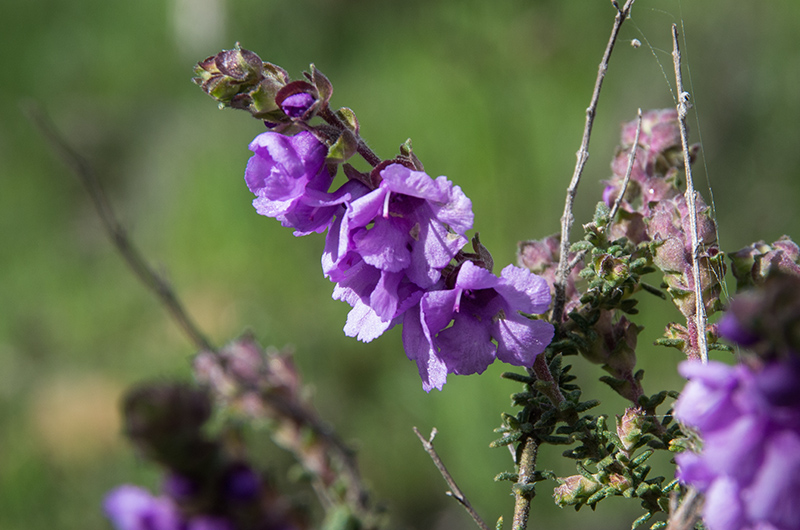
- Near Castlemaine

Scientific classification
- Kingdom: Plantae
- Clade: Tracheophytes
- Clade: Angiosperms
- Clade: Eudicots
- Clade: Asterids
- Order: Lamiales
- Family: Lamiaceae
- Genus: Prostanthera
- Species: P. denticulata

Binomial name
- Prostanthera denticulata R.Br.
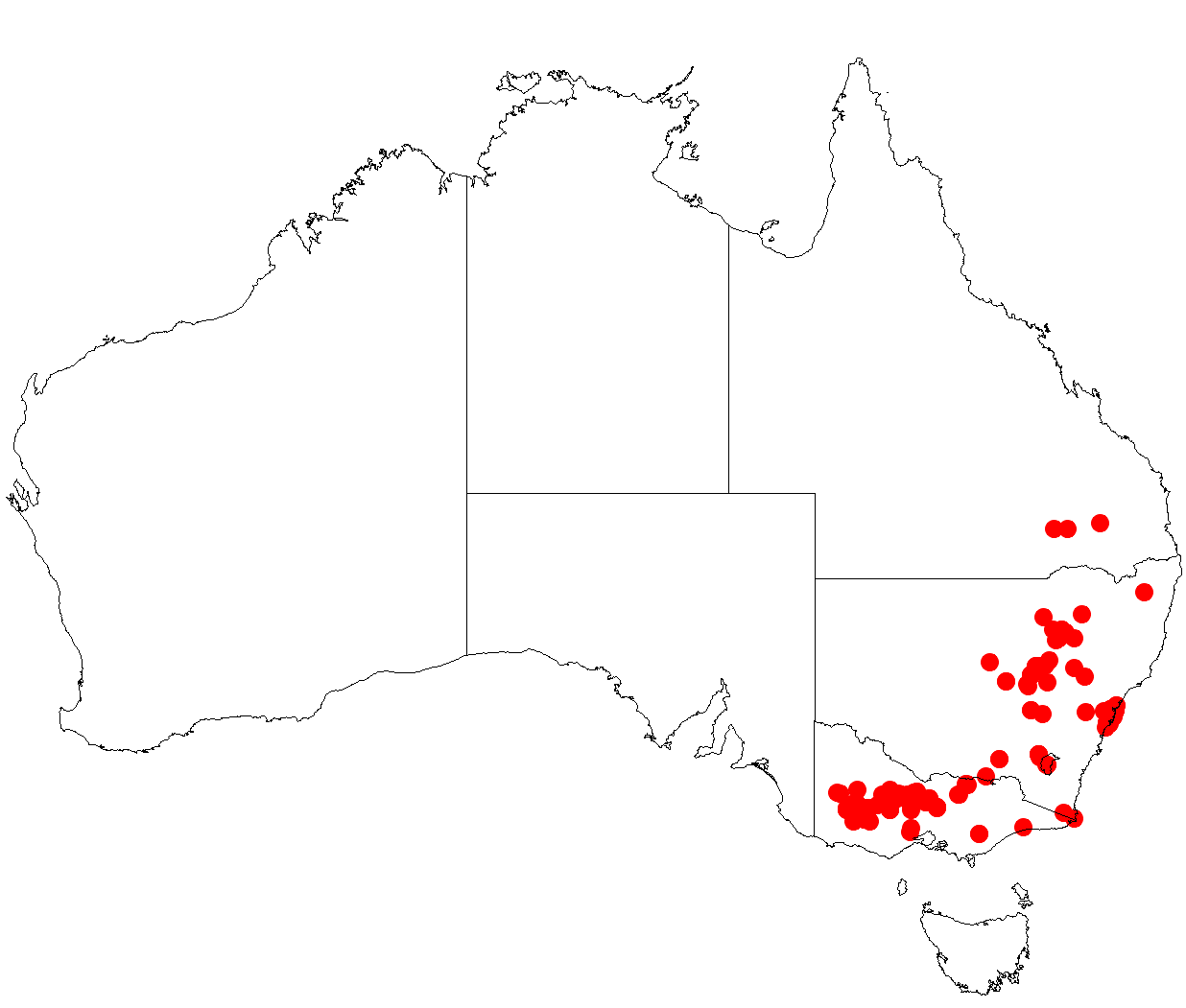
- Occurrence data from AVH

Synonyms
- Prostanthera denticulata R.Br. var. denticulata

= Prostanthera denticulata =

Rough mint-bush

Species of flowering plant

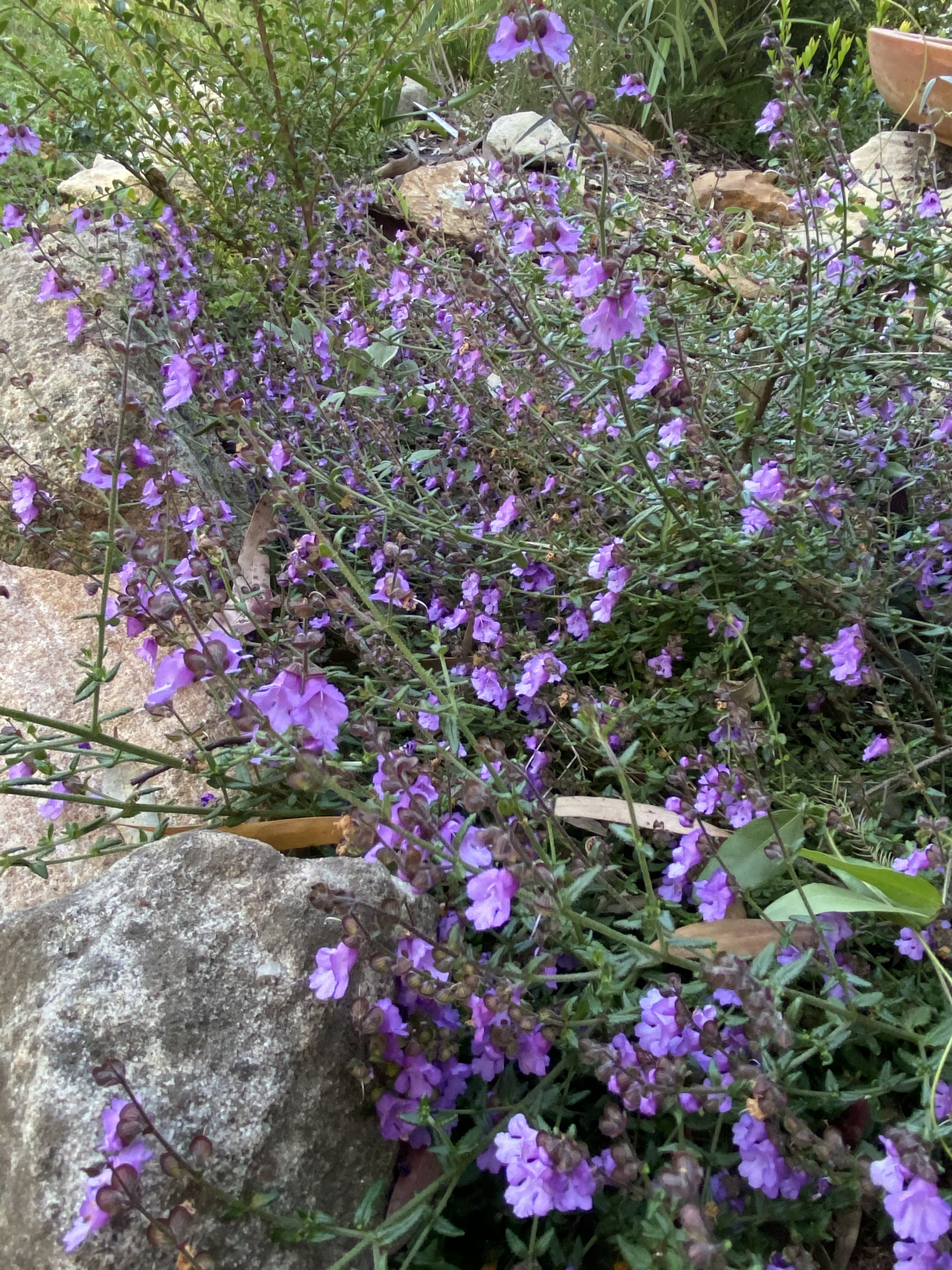
Habit

Prostanthera denticulata, commonly known as rough mint-bush, is a species of flowering plant in the family Lamiaceae and is endemic to coastal New South Wales. It is a straggling to almost prostrate, aromatic shrub with narrow egg-shaped leaves and purple to mauve flowers arranged in leaf axils or on the ends of branchlets.

== Description ==
Prostanthera denticulata is a straggling to more or less prostrate, aromatic shrub that typically grows to a height of 1 m (3 ft 3 in), spreading to 2 m (6 ft 7 in) wide, with short, flattened hairs on the branchlets. The leaves are egg-shaped, 4–10 mm (0.16–0.39 in) long and 2–3 mm (0.079–0.118 in) wide on a petiole 0.5–1 mm (0.020–0.039 in) long. The flowers are arranged in leaf axils near the ends of branchlets with bracteoles 1–1.5 mm (0.039–0.059 in) long at the base. The sepals are 3.5–5 mm (0.14–0.20 in) long forming a tube 2–2.5 mm (0.079–0.098 in) long with two lobes, the upper lobe about 2 mm (0.079 in) long. The petals are 7–10 mm (0.28–0.39 in) long and form a purple to mauve tube. Flowering occurs in spring and early summer.

== Taxonomy ==
Prostanthera denticulata was first formally described in 1810 by Robert Brown in Prodromus Florae Novae Hollandiae et Insulae Van Diemen. A recent study of P. denticulata demonstrated that coastal forms are distinct from those found elsewhere in New South Wales and Victoria. As Brown made numerous collections of P. denticulata and did not specify a holotype, a lectotype was designated from one of Brown's collections made at the head of Middle Harbour, Sydney. Accessions previously assigned as P. denticulata from Bathurst, Medway, Temora and West Wyalong were separated as the new species P. crocodyloides.

== Distribution and habitat ==
Prostanthera denticulata grows in sandy, gravelly, well-drained soils derived from Triassic coarse-grained sandstone. Surrounding vegetation typically has heath-like elements in woodland or wet sclerophyll forest. It is known from the Central Coast between Bouddi National Park and the Royal National Park in New South Wales.
