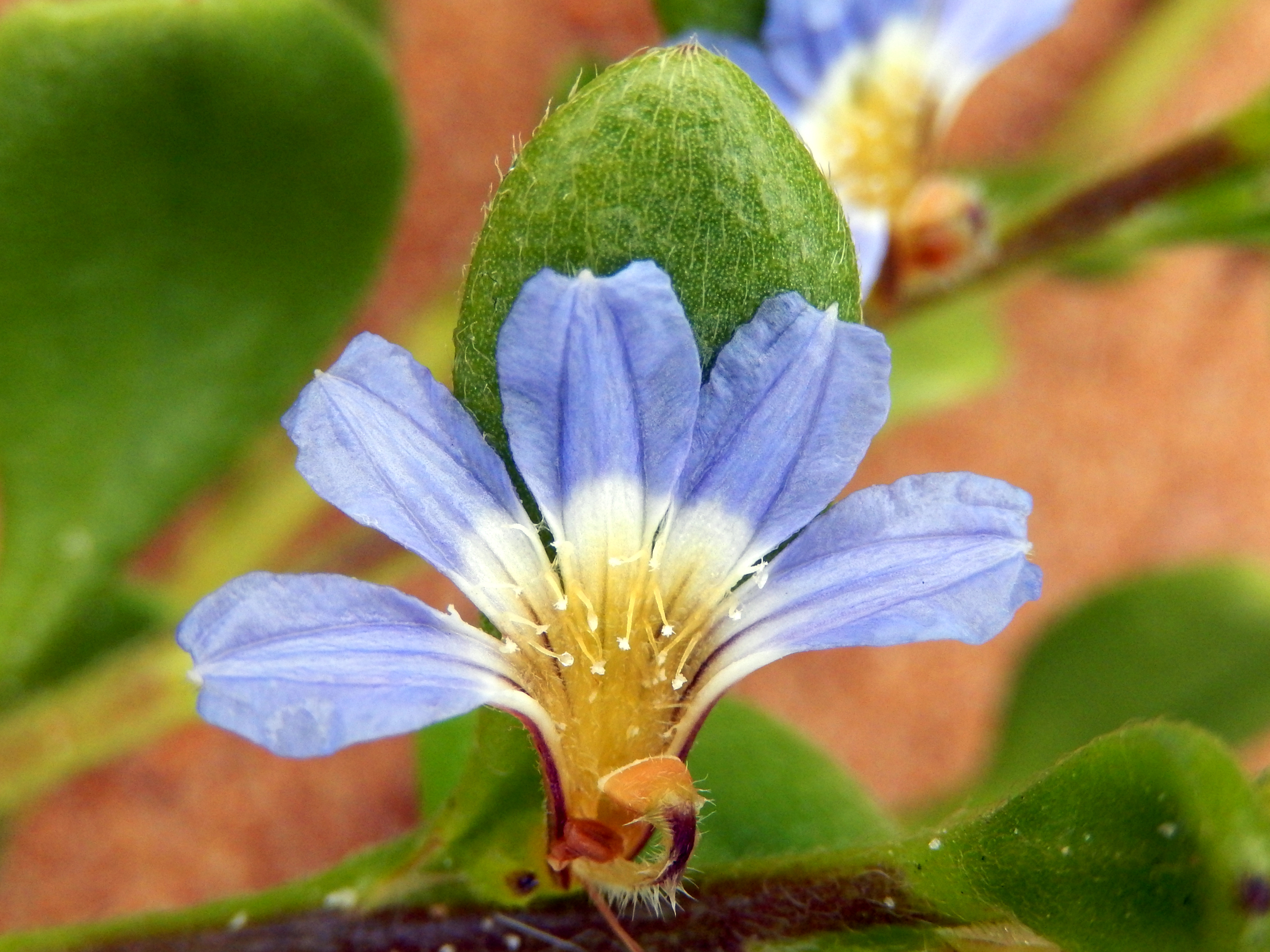

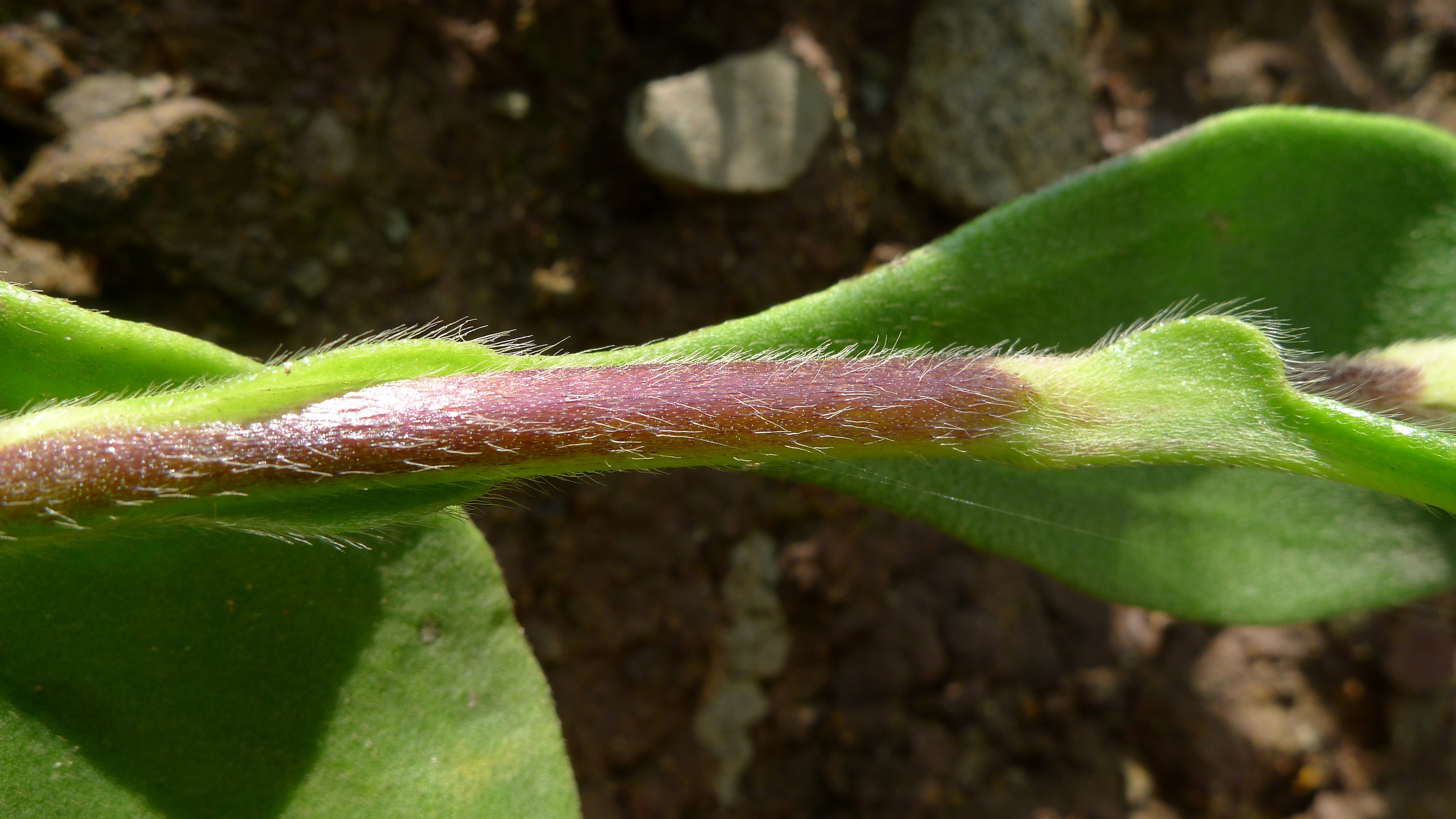

Scientific classification
- Kingdom: Plantae
- Clade: Embryophytes
- Clade: Tracheophytes
- Clade: Spermatophytes
- Clade: Angiosperms
- Clade: Eudicots
- Clade: Asterids
- Order: Asterales
- Family: Goodeniaceae
- Genus: Scaevola
- Species: S. calendulacea

Binomial name
- Scaevola calendulacea (Andrews) Druce
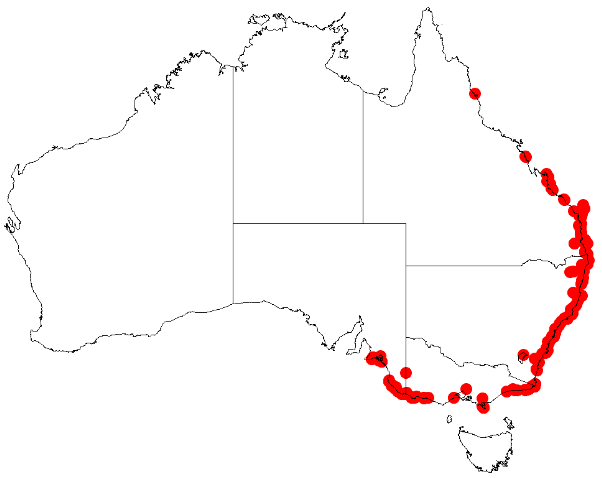
- Occurrence data from Australasian Virtual Herbarium

Synonyms
- Goodenia calendulacea Andrews; Merkusia suaveolens (R.Br.) de Vriese; Lobelia calendulacea (Andrews) Kuntze; Scaevola suaveolens R.Br.

= Scaevola calendulacea =

Dune fan-flower

Species of plant

Scaevola calendulacea commonly known as dune fan-flower, is a flowering plant in the family Goodeniaceae. It is a small, mat-forming shrub with blue fan-shaped flowers with a yellow centre and grows on sand dunes in eastern and southern Australia.

== Description ==
Scaevola calendulacea is a prostrate shrub growing up to 40 cm (16 in) high with oblong to lance shaped or egg shaped leaves up to 8 cm (3.1 in) long, 27 mm (1.1 in) wide, margins smooth with flattened hairs, and tapering to the base. The blue flowers are borne on terminal spikes up to 8 cm (3.1 in) long, corolla 12–18 mm (0.47–0.71 in) long, soft, short hairs on the outside, bearded inside and the wings are 1–2 mm (0.039–0.079 in) wide. Flowering occurs throughout the year and the fruit is white or purplish, globular, smooth, up to 12 mm (0.47 in) in diameter and the ovary has two locules.

== Taxonomy and naming ==
Scaevola calendulacea was first formally described in 1798 by Henry Cranke Andrews as Goodenia calendulacea, but in 1917 was assigned to the genus, Scaevola, by George Claridge Druce.The specific epithet (calendulacea) refers to the similarity to the genus Calendula.

== Distribution and habitat ==
This scaevola is a widespread species growing on sand dunes in coastal locations in South Australia, Queensland, New South Wales and Victoria.
