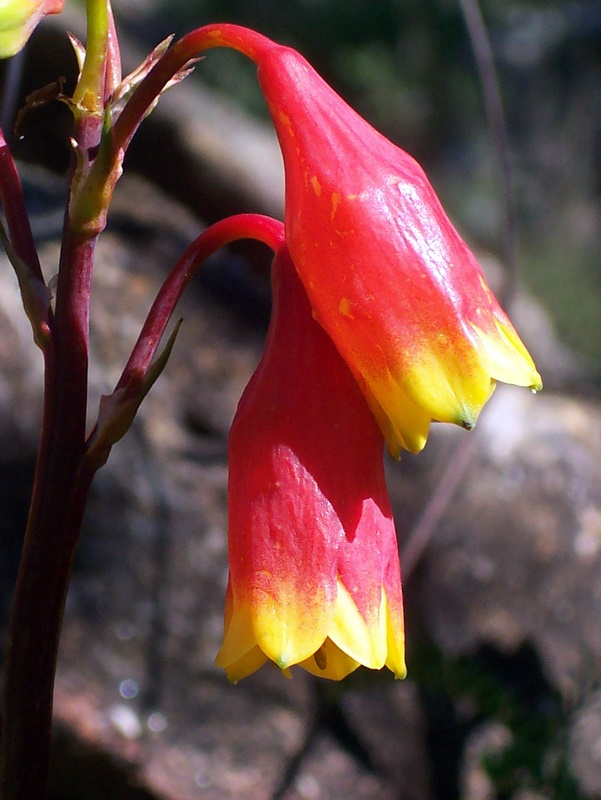
- Christmas Bell flowers at Berowra Valley Regional Park, Australia

Scientific classification
- Kingdom: Plantae
- Clade: Tracheophytes
- Clade: Angiosperms
- Clade: Monocots
- Order: Asparagales
- Family: Blandfordiaceae
- Genus: Blandfordia
- Species: B. nobilis

Binomial name
- Blandfordia nobilis Sm.

Synonyms
- Blandfordia nobilis var. imperialis W.Mill. & N.Taylor in L.H.Bailey

= Blandfordia nobilis =

Christmas bells

Species of flowering plant

Blandfordia nobilis, commonly known as Christmas bells or gadigalbudyari in Cadigal language, is a flowering plant endemic to New South Wales, Australia. It is a tufted, perennial herbs with narrow, linear leaves and between three and twenty large, drooping, cylindrical to bell-shaped flowers. The flowers are brownish red with yellow tips. It is one of four species of Blandfordia known as Christmas bells, this one growing on the coast and ranges south of Sydney.

== Description ==
Blandfordia nobilis has thick, fibrous roots that can form strong, long-lived clumps. The leaves are stiff and grassy, up to 75 cm (30 in) long and 3–5 mm (0.12–0.20 in) wide, sometimes with small teeth. The flowering stems is unbranched, up to 80 cm (31 in) long and 6 mm (0.24 in) wide with between three and twenty flowers, each on a pedicel stalk up to 35 mm (1.4 in) long with a small bract near its base. The three sepals and three petals are fused to form a cylindrical flower usually 20–30 mm (0.79–1.2 in) long and about 10 mm (0.39 in) wide. The base of the flower is narrowed and the end has six pointed lobes about 5 mm (0.20 in) long. The flower is usually brownish red with yellow lobes. The stamens are attached to the inside wall of the flower tube, just below its middle. Flowering occurs from September to February, with a peak in December and January, and is followed by the fruit which is a capsule about 60 mm (2.4 in) long on a stalk up to 25 mm (0.98 in) long.

== Taxonomy and naming ==
Blandfordia nobilis was first formally described in 1804 by English botanist James Edward Smith who published the description in Exotic Botany from dried specimens sent from Sydney by the colonial surgeon, John White. The type specimen was collected from Port Jackson about the year 1800. Blandfordia nobilis was first published in 1804 by English botanist James Edward Smith, and it still bears its original name. The specific epithet (nobilis) is a Latin word meaning "well-known", "celebrated" or "noble".

== Distribution and habitat ==
Blandfordia nobilis grows on poor sandstone soils and swampy areas, between the towns of Sydney, Milton and Braidwood. In wet heathland it is associated with sundews (Drosera) and Schoenus brevifolius.

== Use in horticulture ==
Seeds of B. nobilis were sent to English plant nurseries at about the same time as dried specimens were sent to the botanist, Smith. However, it was not until 1818 that the plants first flowered. It is not clear which species had flowered as at least some species called B. cunninghamii were in fact B. nobilis.

== Culture ==
Blandiflora nobilis is the subject of a Christmas Song "My Little Christmas Belle" published in 1909 by Sydney's popular song composer Joe Slater (1872-1926) with lyrics by Scottish entertainer Ward McAlister (1872-1928). The copy in the National Library of Australia bears a cartoon depiction of the blossom.

== Paintings ==
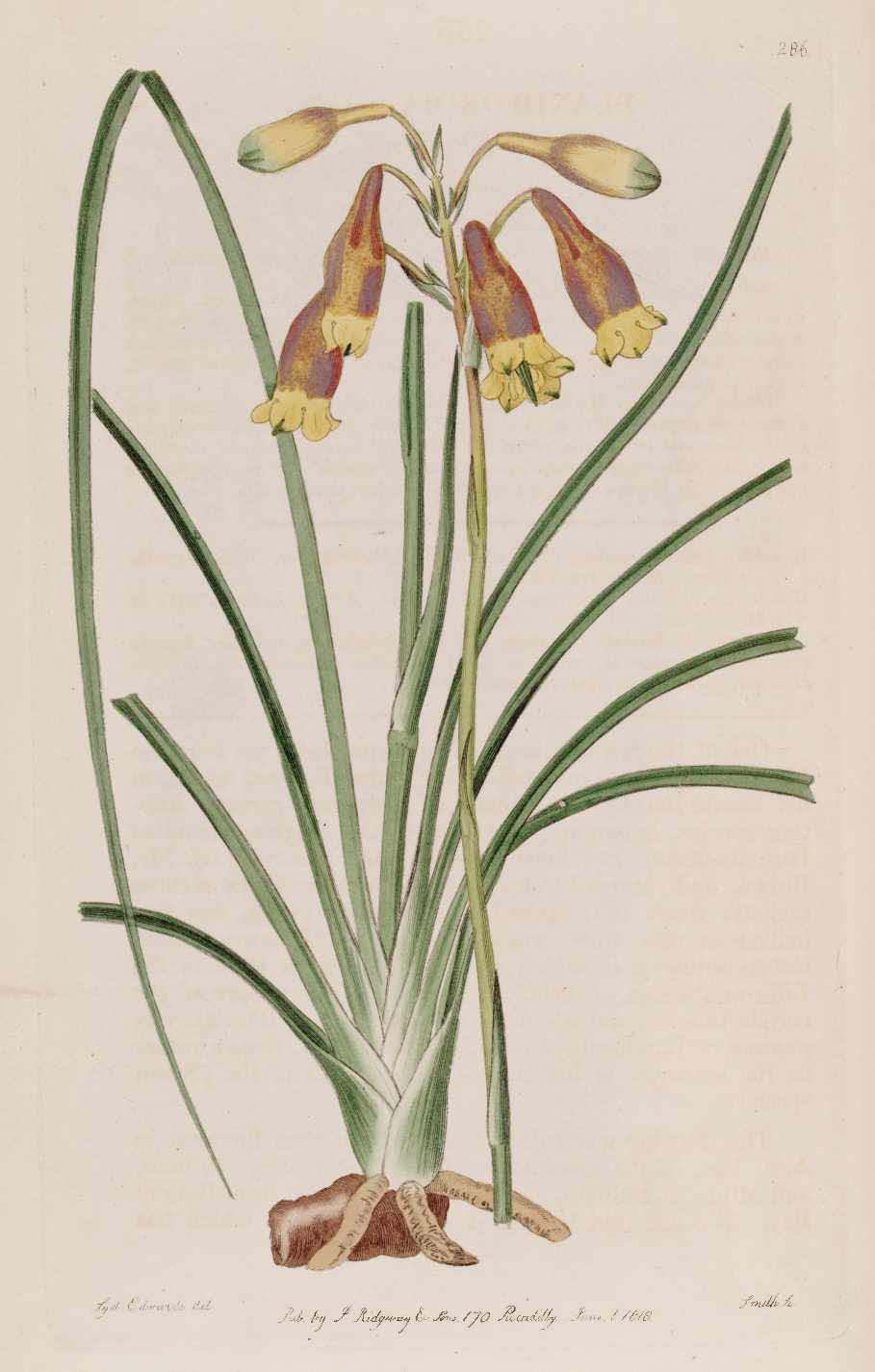
Christmas Bells published in 1818

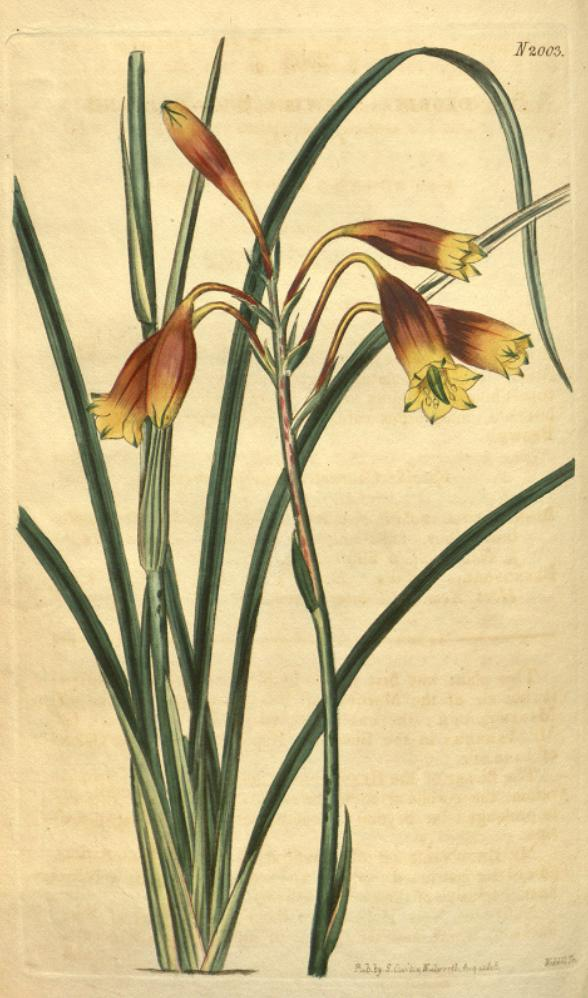
Christmas Bells by John Sims
