= Australia Post stamps and products =

Stamp releases from 2002 to 2018, with added context from 2014

This article covers year-by-year releases of postage stamps issued by Australia Post from 2002 to 2018. From 2014 onwards, background information was provided behind the reasoning of issuing the stamp to the public. To mark special occasions, Australia Post occasionally releases unique and limited-time only postal stamp designs, and less frequently, specially designed postal products.

== History of Australia Post stamps ==
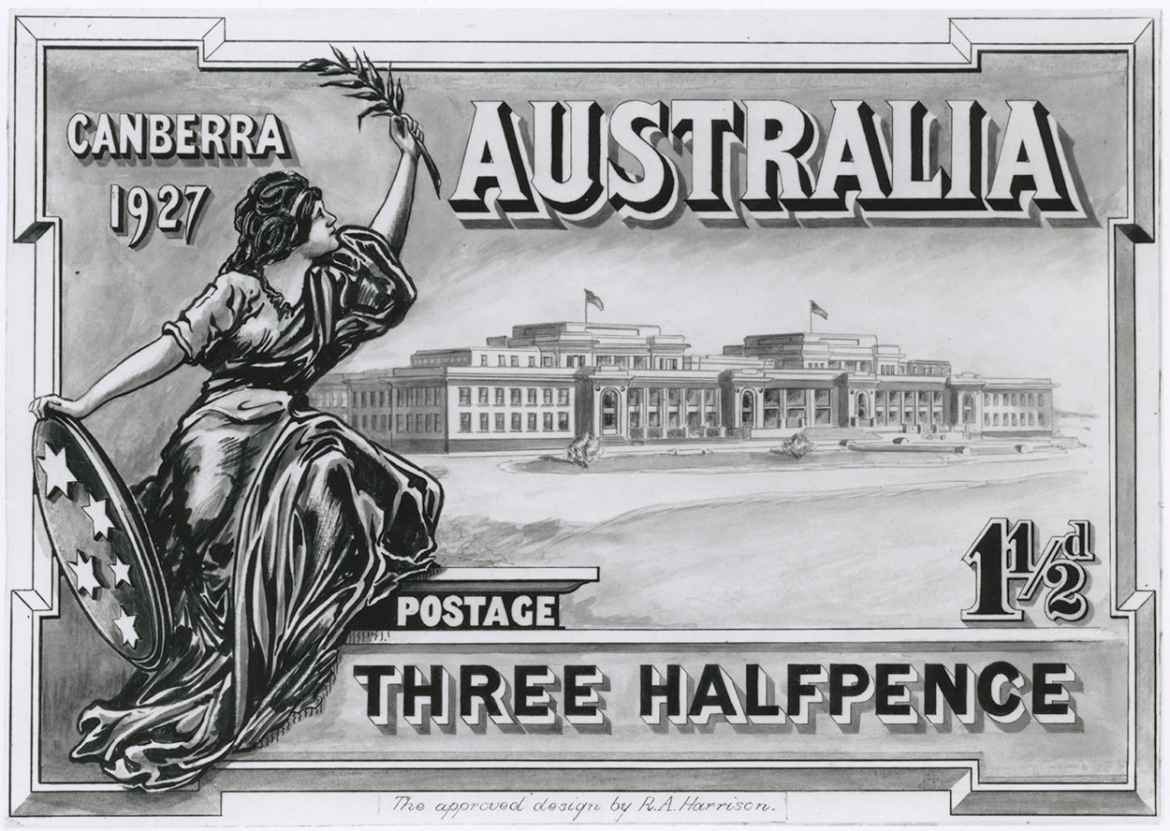
First commemorative stamp in Australia (1927)

Before the formation of Commonwealth of Australia on 1 January 1901, each state of Australia issued separate postage stamps through colonial mail systems. After the federation in 1901, the mail systems merged and formed the Postmaster-General's Department (PMG), whose responsibilities included the provision of postal and telegraphic services throughout Australia. Until the mid-1920s, a policy prohibited Australia Post producing stamps based on commemorative occasions. It was on 9 May 1927, the opening of the first Parliament House in Canberra that marked the creation of Australia's first commemorative stamp. From then, commemorative stamps have been produced regularly to generate public interest, and to establish an environment for collectors. Although commemorative stamps are produced in reflection of historical anniversaries or significant events at the time, the public can suggest stamp subjects to Australia Post.

== Stamp releases by year ==
Under the Copyright law of Australia, Australia Post claims copyright ownership of Australian stamps for 50 years from publication. In 2014, Australia Post released technical and historical information on their stamp issues, on their official page. In this article, the stamps that are inside the tables are hyperlinked to their official page, where the original images can viewed from there.

=== 2002 ===
- Birth of Albert Namatjira
- Australian Legends: Medical Scientists
- Golden Jubilee
- Winter Olympics Gold Medallists
- Motor Racing
- Lighthouses in Australia
- Flinders - Baudin Bicentenary: joint issue with France
- International: Panoramas of Australia I
- Nature of Australia - Desert
- Waterlilies: Joint issue with Thailand
- International: Panoramas of Australia II
- International Greetings
- Bush Tucker
- The Magic Rainforest (SCM2002)
- Champions of the Turf
- Christmas

=== 2003 ===
- Celebration and Nation
- Australian Legends
- Fishing Australia
- Blooms - Australian Cultivars
- Australian Paintings
- Coronation - Golden Jubilee
- Art of Papunya Tula
- Genetics
- Nature of Australia - Rainforests
- 150th Anniversary Murray River Shipping
- Peace and Goodwill
- High Court Centenary
- Bugs and Butterflies (SCM2003)
- Rugby World Cup
- Active with Asthma
- Christmas

=== 2004 ===
- Australian Legends: Dame Joan Sutherland
- Tasmania 1804-2004
- Landmark Bridges
- Celebrate (16 March 2004)
- Renewable Energy
- Royal Tour Jubilee
- Nature of Australia: Rainforest Butterflies (4 May 2004)
- Australian Innovations
- Bon Voyage
- 150th Anniversary of the Eureka Stockade
- Boxing Kangaroo
- Australian Olympic Stamps 2004
- Australian Gold Medallists
- Coastlines (6 September)
- Treasures from the Archives
- 150th Anniversary of Railways
- Cats and Dogs (SCM 2004)
- Australian Heroes of Grand Prix Racing
- Christmas

=== 2005 ===
- Australian Open 1905–2005 (11 January 2005)
- Australian Legends: Fashion Designers
- Australian Parrots
- Sports Treasures
- Marking the Occasion
- World Heritage: Australia - UK joint issue
- Creatures of the Slime
- Centenary of Rotary International
- 150th Anniversary of the First Australian Coin
- Queen's Birthday
- Bush Wildlife
- Australian Wildflowers
- Australian Wine
- Australian Native Trees
- Treasures from the Archives
- Down on the Farm (SCM2005)
- Queen's Baton Relay PNC (28 October 2005)
- Christmas Island – Christmas 2005

=== 2006 ===
- Australia Post Australian Legend 2006 – Barry Humphries
- Roses
- Australian Native Wildlife
- Australian Wildflowers
- Torino 2006 Winter Olympics – Dale Begg-Smith
- Australian Native Wildlife
- Queen's Birthday
- Greetings From Australia
- Lighthouses of the 20th Century
- Soccer in Australia
- Postie Kate
- Whales Down Under
- Extreme Sports
- Driving Through The Years
- Australian Rock Posters
- Dangerous Australians
- Fish of the Australian Antarctic Territory - Janet Matthews
- Cocos (Keeling) Islands – Coral Reefs
- Christmas Island – Heritage Buildings
- Christmas Island – Lunar New Year 2006

=== 2007 ===
==== January—March ====
Date	Issue	Stamp Designs	Technical details
16 January	Australia Wins The Ashes 2006-07	Designer: Symone Lambert, AP Design Studio; Denominations: 1 x 50c 1 x $1.85 (international)	FDI Withdrawal Date: 31 July 2007; Printing Process: Lithography; Special Feature: None; National Postmark: Perth GPO, Western Australia 6000
24 January	Legends of Australian Horse Racing	Designer: Jonathan Chong, AP Design Studio; Denominations: 12 x 50c Designs: (two stamps of each legend); Scobie Breasley, George Moore, Roy Higgins, Bart Cummings, Bob Ingham, John Tapp.	FDI Withdrawal Date: 31 December 2007; Printing Process: Lithography; Special Feature: None; National Postmark: Flemington, Victoria 3031
13 February	Australian Wildflowers	Designer: Lynette Traynor, AP Design Studio; Denominations: 4 x 50c Designs: Tasmanian Christmas Bell; Phebalium wkitei Green Spider Flower; Stuart's Desert Rose	FDI Withdrawal Date: 13 March 2007; Printing Process: Lithography; Special Feature: None; National Postmark: GPO Hobart, Tasmania 7000
20 February	12th FINA World Championships	Designer: Lisa Christensen, AP Design Studio; Denominations: 1 x 50c Designs: Melbourne 2007 Logo	FDI Withdrawal Date: 13 March 2007; Printing Process: Lithography; Special Feature: None; National Postmark: Melbourne GPO Victoria 3000
5 March	Island Jewels - International Stamps	Designer: Adam Crapp, AP Design Studio; Denominations: 1 x 10c, 30c, $1.30, $1.95, $2.60, $3.85; Designs: Maria Island, Tasmania - 10c Rottnest Island, Western Australia - 30c Green Island, Queensland - $1.30; Fraser Island, Queensland - $1.95; Kangaroo Island, South Australia - $2.60; Lord Howe Island, NSW - $3.85	FDI Withdrawal Date: 30 April 2007; Printing Process: Lithography; Special Feature: None; National Postmark: Beauty Point, Tasmania 7270
6 March	Year of the Surf Lifesaver	Designer: Andrew Hogg Design; Denominations: 2 x 50c, 1 x $1.00, $2.00, $2.45 (Lenticular); Designs: Lifesaving Australia Pictures	FDI Withdrawal Date: 30 September 2007; Printing Process: Lithography; Special Feature: Lenticular frames National Postmark: Bondi Beach, New South Wales 2026

==== 2007: April–June ====
Date	Issue	Stamp Designs	Technical details
3 April	Signs of the Zodiac	Designer: Beth McKinlay & Sally Piskuric, AP Design Studio; Denominations: 12 x 50c Designs: Each stamp available as gummed, self-adhesive (roll) and in 10 x 50c self-adhesive booklets (one per design). Aries, Taurus, Gemini, Cancer, Leo, Virgo, Libra, Scorpio, Sagittarius, Capricorn, Aquarius, Pisces	Printing Process: Lithography by SEP Sprint on Tullis Russell paper (gummed) and B/C 100 paper (self-adhesive booklets); Special Feature: None
10 April	Nostalgic Tourism Posters	Designer: Phil Ellett, Creative Ethos, Melbourne; Denominations: 1 x 50c, 1 x $1, 1 x $2, 1 x $2.45; Designs: At the Beach (50c), Fishing ($1), Horse Riding ($2), Winter Sport ($2.45)	Printing Process: Lithography by SEP Sprint on Tullis Russell paper Special Feature: None
18 April	Queen's Birthday	Designer: Ern-Mei Lee, AP Design Studio; Denominations: 1 x 50c Designs: Portrait	Printing Process: Lithography by SEP Sprint; Special Feature: None
1 May	Historic Shipwrecks	Designer: Sally Piskuric, AP Design Studio (from illustrations by Iain MacKellar); Denominations: 1 x 50c, 1 x $1, 1 x $2; Designs: Admella (50c), Loch Ard ($1), Dunbar ($2)	Printing Process: Lithography by SEP Sprint on Tullis Russell paper Special Feature: None
8 May	Country to Coast International	Designer: Adam Crapp, AP Design Studio; Denominations: 1 x $1.30, 1 x $1.95; Designs: Each design available as gummed, self-adhesive and self-adhesive with personalised tab. Rock Wallaby ($1.30), Sydney Harbour Bridge ($1.95)	Printing Process: Lithography by SEP Sprint on Tullis Russell paper (gummed); Special Feature: None
15 May	Circus: Under the Big Top	Designer: Sharon Rodziewicz, AP Design Studio; Denominations: 5 x 50c Designs: Each design available as gummed and in a $5 self-adhesive booklet (2 x each design). Burning Bicycle, Inside-out Man, Dental Trapeze, Banana Lady, Human Cannonball	Printing Process: Lithography by SEP Sprint on Tullis Russell paper (gummed) and B100 paper (self-adhesive booklets); Special Feature: None
5 June	Big Things	Designer: Reg Mombassa; Denominations: 5 x 50c Designs: Each design available as gummed and in a $5 self-adhesive booklet (2 x each design). Big Golden Guitar, Tamworth, NSW; Big Lobster, Kingston, SA; Big Banana, Coffs Harbour, NSW; Big Merino, Goulburn, NSW; Big Pineapple, Nambour, QLD	Printing Process: Lithography by SEP Sprint on Tullis Russell paper (gummed) and B100 paper (self-adhesive booklets); Special Feature: None
26 June	Threatened Wildlife	Designer: Ego Guiotto (illustrations); Simone Sakinofsky (typography); Denominations: 2 x 50c, 1 x $1.25, 1 x $1.30; Designs: Grey-headed Flying Fox (50c), Mountain Pygmy Possum (50c), Flatback Turtle ($1.25), Wandering Albatross ($1.30)	Printing Process: Lithography by SEP Sprint on Tullis Russell paper Special Feature: None

Topics used for 2007 stamp designs

Events

- 2007 Australian Open
- 2007 World Police and Fire Games
- 2007 Stawell Gift

People

- Rod Laver

Films

- Harry Potter and the Order of the Phoenix

=== 2008 ===
- Love Blooms
- Australian Legends of Philanthropy
- Organ and Tissue Donation
- Centenary of Scouting in Australia
- Gorgeous Australia
- Gorgeous Australia
- World Youth Day 2008
- Centenary of Rugby League
- Heavy Haulers
- Anzac Day – Lest We Forget
- Queen's Birthday
- Centenary of Rugby League
- Queen's Birthday
- Up, Up and Away
- Working Dogs
- Beijing 2008
- Living Green
- 100 Years of Quarantine
- 150 Years of Australian Football
- Aviation
- Waterfalls Australia
- Tourist Precincts
- For Every Occasion
- Mega Fauna
- Christmas
- Favourite Australian Films

=== 2009 ===
- Christmas Island Lunar New Year - Year of the Ox (8 January 2009)
- Australian Antarctic Territory: South Magnetic Pole 1909-2009 (8 January 2009)
- 2009 Australian Legends (22 January 2009)
- With Love (3 February 2009)
- Inventive Australia (19 February 2009)
- Australian Antarctic Territory: Poles and Glaciers (4 March 2009)
- Earth Hour (11 March 2009)
- Australia Post - 200 Years (25 March 2009)
- Indigenous Culture (1 April 2009)
- Queens Birthday (15 April 2009)
- Cocos (Keeling) Islands - 400 Years (21 April 2009)
- Not Just Desserts (15 May 2009)
- World Wildlife Fund: Dolphins of the Australian Coastline (26 May 2009)
- Queensland 150 Years (9 June 2009)
- Australia's Favourite Stamps (26 June 2009)
- Australian Bush Babies - International Stamps (1 July 2009)
- Australian Parks and Gardens (14 July 2009)
- Micro Monsters (28 July 2009)
- Species at Risk - Joint Territories (4 August 2009)
- Corrugated Landscapes (11 August 2009)
- Stargazing: The Southern Skies (25 August 2009)
- Australian Songbirds (9 September 2009)
- Classic Toys (25 September 2009)
- Lets Get Active! Stamp Collecting Month 2009 (6 October 2009)
- Australia Post - 200 Years (Part III) - Everyday People (13 October 2009)
- Christmas Island Christmas (2 November 2009)
- Merry Christmas (2 November 2009)
- Christmas 2009 (2 November 2009)

=== 2010 ===
- Christmas Island Lunar New Year - Year of the Tiger (12 January 2010)
- Australian Legends (21 January 2010)
- 2010 Winter Olympic Games Vancouver (12–28 February 2010)
- A Bicentenary: Governor Lachlan Macquarie (16 February 2010)
- Australian Commonwealth Coinage 1910-2010 (23 February 2010)
- Centenary of Powered Flight (9 March 2010)
- Come to the Show (23 March 2010)
- Queens Birthday (6 April 2010)
- Kokoda (20 April 2010)
- Colonial Heritage: Empire (7 May 2010)
- Great Australian Railway Journeys (7 May 2010)
- Shanghai World Expo 2010 (18 May 2010)
- Australian World Heritage Sites (25 May 2010)
- Emergency Services (13 July 2010)
- Flowers of Cocos (Keeling) Islands (22 June 2010)
- Australian Antarctic Territory - Macquarie Island (22 June 2010)
- Adopted and Adored (29 June 2010)
- Emergency Services (13 July 2010)
- For Special Occasions (19 July 2010)
- The Australian Tax Office Centenary (27 July 2010)
- Burke & Wills expedition (3 August 2010)
- Christmas Island Frigatebird (WWF) (17 August 2010)
- Centenary of Girl Guides (31 August 2010)
- National Service Memorial (8 November 2010)
- Flowers of Cocos (Keeling) Islands (15 September 2010)
- Long Weekend (22 September 2010)
- Wildlife Caring: Rescue to Release (5 October 2010)
- Canonisation of Mary MacKillop (18 October 2010)
- Australian Antarctic Territory: Macquarie Island (26 October 2010)
- Australian Kingfishers (26 October 2010)
- Christmas Island Christmas 2010 (1 November 2010)
- 150th Melbourne Cup (1 November 2010)
- Dear Santa (1 November 2010)
- Christmas 2010 (1 November 2010)

=== 2011 ===
- Christmas Island Lunar New Year - Rabbit (11 January 2011)
- Cocos (Keeling) Islands Boats (18 January 2011)
- Special Occasions: Love (18 January 2011)
- Australian Legends - Advancing Equality (20 January 2011)
- Premier's Flood Relief Appeal (27 January 2011)
- 100 Years of Postal Stationery in Australia (8 February 2011)
- Centenary of International Women's Day (15 February 2011)
- Air Force Aviation (22 February 2011)
- Floral Festivals Australia (8 March 2011)
- Gallery Series (part 1) NGV Flowers (22 March 2011)
- Lake Eyre (4 April 2011)
- Queen's 85th Birthday (5 April 2011)
- The Royal Wedding (12 April 2011)
- "Capturing the Moment" Royal Wedding instant stamp (4 May 2011)
- Nellie Melba: (1861-1931) (10 May 2011)
- Farming Australia: Native Plants (17 May 2011)
- Christmas Island Crabs (7 June 2011)
- Australian Antarctic Territory: Icebergs (7 June 2011)
- Royal Australian Navy 1911-2011 (14 June 2011)
- Centenary of Duntroon (27 June 2011)
- Australian Bush Babies (1 July 2011)
- Anniversary of Amnesty International (5 July 2011)
- Living Australia (5 July 2011)
- Skiing Australia (19 July 2011)
- Colonial Heritage Part II - Emerging Identity (28 July 2011)
- Centenary of the Australasian Antarctic Expedition (2 August 2011)
- World Wide Fund for Nature: 50 Years (30 August 2011)
- Colours of Cocos (Keeling) Islands (6 September 2011)
- Golf (27 September 2011)
- SCM 2011 - Mythical Creatures (4 October 2011)
- CHOGM 2011 (18 October 2011)
- Joint Issue Australia-Korea (31 October 2011)
- Christmas Island Christmas (31 October 2011)
- Christmas 2011 (31 October 2011)
- Remembrance Day: 11.11.11 (2 November 2011)
- ANZUS (16 November 2011)

=== 2012 ===
- Lunar New Year 2012 - Year of the Dragon (10 January 2012)
- Precious Moments (17 January 2012)
- 2012 Australian Legends of Football (20 January 2012)
- Technology - Then and Now (7 February 2012)
- Capital City Transport (21 February 2012)
- Australian Antarctic Territory: Phillip Law 1912-2010 (6 March 2012)
- Australian Waterbirds (6 March 2012)
- Farming Australia (20 March 2012)
- Centenary of Compulsory Enrolment to Vote (27 March 2012)
- Queen's Birthday Diamond Jubilee (3 April 2012)
- Medical Doctors (10 April 2012)
- Rising Sun Badge (17 April 2012)
- Christmas Island Ferns (1 May 2012)
- Underwater World (8 May 2012)
- Skies of Cocos (22 May 2012)
- Olympic Games - The Road to London (5 June 2012)
- Colonial Heritage - Visualising Australia (19 June 2012)
- ONJ Cancer & Wellness Centre Appeal (19 June 2012)
- Farming Australia - Part II (26 June 2012)
- Inland Explorers (3 July 2012)
- London 2012 Olympic Games (17 July 2012)
- Living Australian (24 July 2012)
- 2012 Australian Gold Medallist - Women's 4 × 100 m Freestyle Relay (31 July 2012)
- Cocos (Keeling) Islands - Butterflies (2 August 2012)
- 2012 Australian Gold Medallist - Tom Slingsby - Sailing Men's Laser (9 August 2012)
- 2012 Australian Gold Medallist - Anna Meares - Cycling: Women's Sprint (10 August 2012)
- 2012 Australian Gold Medallist - Mathew Belcher and Malcolm Page - Sailing: Men's 470 Class (13 August 2012)
- 2012 Australian Gold Medallist - Men's K4 1000m - Canoe-Kayak team (13 August 2012)
- 2012 Australian Gold Medallist - Nathan Outerridge and Iaine Jensen - Sailing: Men's 49er (13 August 2012)
- 2012 Australian Gold Medallist - Sally Pearson - Women's 100m Hurdles (13 August 2012)
- Australian Nobel Prize Winners (28 August 2012)
- Centenary of the Australian Antarctic Expedition (4 September 2012)
- Road Trip Australia (18 September 2012)
- Wilderness Australia (25 September 2012)
- SCM 2012: Australian Zoos (28 September 2012)
- 50 Years of Racing at Bathurst (2 October 2012)
- Sporting Legends: Susie O'Neill (12 October 2012)
- 50th Anniversary of the Australian Ballet (16 October 2012)
- Lawn Bowls in Australia (1 November 2012)
- Christmas Island Christmas (1 November 2012)
- Christmas (1 November 2012)

=== 2013 ===
- Lunar New Year 2013 - Year of the Snake (8 January 2013)
- Australian Legends of Music (18 January 2013)
- Special Occasions: Greetings (5 February 2013)
- Surfing Australia (12 February 2013)
- Top Dogs (19 February 2013)
- Centenary of Canberra (5 March 2013)
- Australian Antarctic Territory: Mountains (12 March 2013)
- National Gallery of Australia: Landscapes (19 March 2013)
- Australia Bush Babies II (2 April 2013)
- Diamond Jubilee Coronations (9 April 2013)
- Australian Botanic Gardens II (23 April 2013)
- Joint Issue: Australia and Israel (10 May 2013)
- Kangaroo and Map 1913-2013 (10 May 2013)
- Black Caviar (10 May 2013)
- Australian Birds Pardalotes (11 May 2013)
- Centenary of the First Commonwealth Bank Notes (11 May 2013)
- Fishes of Christmas Island (21 May 2013)
- Cocos (Keeling) Islands 50th Anniversary of stamps (4 June 2013)
- Government House Historical Architecture (11 June 2013)
- Christmas Island Flowering Shrubs (18 June 2013)
- Road Trip Australia II (2 July 2013)
- Indigenous Leaders (9 July 2013)
- Headline news (23 July 2013)
- Cocos (Keeling) Islands Barrel Mail (6 August 2013)
- Carnivorous Plants (13 August 2013)
- Australia's Coral Reefs (20 August 2013)
- Australian Poultry Breeds (3 September 2013)
- Australian Antarctic Territory: Centenary of AAE III (10 September 2013)
- SCM: Australia's Age of Dinosaurs (24 September 2013)
- Historic Railway Stations (8 October 2013)
- Joint Issue with Germany (15 October 2013)
- Holey Dollar and Dump (22 October 2013)
- Christmas Island Christmas (1 November 2013)
- Christmas 2013 (1 November 2013)

=== 2014 ===
Stamp	Date	Designer	Background Information
Lunar New Year 2014 - Year of the Horse	7 January 2014	Dani Poon and Sonia Young	The stamps show the development of the Chinese character for the horse, shown fully in the $1.80c stamp, and the way it is derived from its pictorial representation, shown in the 60c stamp. Paper cut motifs are used to pictorially represent the horse in the 60c stamp. Paper cuts are one of the most popular forms of Chinese art and are commonly used to decorate windows, lanterns, mirrors, gates and walls during the Chinese New Year celebrations.
A Royal Christening	7 January 2014	Jo Mure	The christening of His Royal Highness Prince George Alexander Louis of Cambridge was an intimate affair, with less than 30 guests. It was held in the small Chapel Royal in St James' Palace on 23 October 2013 and was attended by his great-grandmother, Queen Elizabeth II and his grandfather, the Prince of Wales. Other guests included his mother's father and his great-grandfather the Duke of Edinburgh. Prince George was born on 22 July 2013 in London's St. Mary's Hospital and is now third in line to the British throne, following his grandfather and father. George was wrapped in a replica of the christening robe used by the royal family since 1841.
Australian Native Orchids	14 January 2014	Sonia Young	Known for their often exquisite flowers, orchids are the largest family of flowering plants in the world with over 30,000 species identified. They are distributed in most countries and are especially prolific in tropical regions, where the majority of species grow on the trunks and branches of trees (epiphytic). In temperate regions, such as southern Australia, most orchids grow in the ground (terrestrial). They are pollinated in different ways including by native bees and wasps.
Australian Legends of Cooking	17 January 2014	Lynette Traynor	For nearly two decades the Australia Post Australian Legends Award has been bestowed as part of the annual Australia Day celebrations. It acknowledges the contributions that great living Australians have made to contemporary culture and society, and to national identity. In 2014, this award recognised a select group of game-changers in Australia's food culture. These individuals have been visionary for their part in shaping Australia's palate, tweaking its tastebuds and taking it from a land of meat and three veg to a place of exciting, innovative and creative culinary fare. Their efforts in redefining the food culture of this country have also been instrumental in plotting Australia's position on the international map of gastronomy.
Australian Antarctic Territory IV 1914 Homeward Bound	18 January 2014	Andrew Hogg	This is the fourth and last issue in a four-year program celebrating the centenary of the Australasian Antarctic Expedition (AAE). The stamps follow the same design style across the four years and feature a combination of images depicting the environment, the men, their work and their lives over this period so that by the end there is a comprehensive mosaic of this extraordinary feat of exploration in Australia's history.
The Urn Returns	20 January 2014	SE Products	The legend of the Ashes was born in August 1882. In an historic match between the English and visiting Australians – in a game with extraordinary turns of fate – Australia beat the home side at the Oval in a match that looked unlosable for the English. By week's end, the Sporting News had published a satirical obituary, penned by Reginald Shirley Watkinshaw Brooks, claiming that English cricket was dead and that its body would be cremated and the ashes taken to the distant homeland of the victorious.
Romance	4 February 2014	Lisa Christensen, Andrew Hogg, and Melinda Coombs	This issue is part of the Special Occasions stamp issue, produced at regular intervals for use on postage relating to commemorations of personal milestones. These stamps comprise part of the Personalised Stamps™ program, in which a personal photograph may feature in a tab alongside the designed stamp. The Romance stamp issue coincides with Valentine's Day, and engages two chief symbols that convey the theme of romance (the heart and the rose) – making them perfect emissaries for messages of affection.
Concession Post	24 March 2014	MDM Design and John White	These special non-denominational stamps feature iconic images of Australia – a kangaroo bounding along a sandy beach at sunset and an outline of our nation inscribed in the sand. These stamps have been introduced to help eligible Australians stay connected in the ever-changing world of mail. Limited numbers of these Concession Stamps were made available to stamp collectors in the form of a Philatelic product.
Floral Emblems	24 March 2014	Jo Mure	The Commonwealth of Australia and each of its states and territories has a floral emblem.
Queen's Birthday	8 April 2014	John White	The Queen's Birthday stamp issue for 2014 features contemporary images of the Queen during her Diamond Jubilee Year.
Special Occasions 2014	15 April 2014	Melinda Coombes, Stacey Zass, Lisa Christensen, Gary Domoney, Sonia Young, Sean Pethick	The new range in the Special Occasions series provides a selection of stamps to mark both personal and public events. This range has particular appeal for planners of special events, for tourists and for those wanting to add a heartfelt touch to their correspondence or invitations.
Centenary of WWI: 1914	22 April 2014	Tim Hancock	This stamp issue is the first in a five-year series that commemorates World War I, the first war in which Australians fought not as colonial soldiers but as Australians. Together, the five issues in will tell a chronological story of the war, with each issue relating the centenary year in which it is released. The designs in this first commemorative stamp issue relate to Australia's part in the first months of the war, from its declaration to troops' arrival in Egypt.
Australian Red Cross Centenary	6 May 2014	Lisa Christensen	Australian Red Cross, one of the many international Red Cross societies around the world, was established in 1914, nine days after the commencement of World War I. The organisation grew at a rapid rate – by November 1914, New South Wales had 88 city or suburban branches and 249 country branches, all established within the previous four months. The Society was accepted by the community from the beginning. Much of the World War I home front activities such as knitting socks and rolling bandages was done by local Red Cross branches.
Bush Ballads	13 May 2014	John White, Jamie and Leanne Tufrey	The bush ballad is a thread of Australia's early literary and popular tradition. It is a rhyming, narrative-based poem adapted for singing. Bush ballads arose from everyday rhymesters setting their words to folk tunes. The form was likely brought to Australia by Irish and English migrants, whose home countries had had versions of the verse tradition for centuries. Bush ballads were thought to be an authentic expression of Australian rural identity, though some also claim that Aboriginal content, where it occurs, is the only unique aspect of Australian ballads. Yet certainly balladists shaped their poems to an Australian setting and cultural context.
G20 Leaders Summit	3 June 2014	MacKillop College and Sharon Rodziewicz	The Group of Twenty (G20) is the premier forum for its members' international economic cooperation and decision-making. Its membership comprises 19 countries plus the European Union. G20 leaders, Finance Ministers and Central Bank Governors meet regularly to discuss ways to strengthen the global economy, reform international financial institutions, improve financial regulation, and discuss the key economic reforms that are needed in each of the member countries. Underpinning these meetings is a year-long program of meetings between senior officials, and of working groups coordinating policy on specific issues.
100th Anniversary of King George V stamp	17 June 2014	John White	A century ago, Australia's stamp designs were "hot" political topics. Labor Postmaster-General, Charles Frazer developed the Kangaroo and Map design as "an effective advertisement" for Australia. A few months later, his successor as Postmaster-General, the Liberal's Agar Wynne, made plans to scrap the kangaroo in favour of stamps featuring the monarch, King George V.
Christmas Island National Park	17 June 2014	Sharon Rodziewicz	Christmas Island is a place of much natural beauty and scientific interest. Located in the Indian Ocean some 2,600 kilometres north-west of Perth, this peak of a submarine mountain range rises to a central plateau at about 360 metres above sea level. It is fringed by an almost continuous rocky cliff that rises to an average of 10–20 metres, broken only in about a dozen places by shallow bays and small beaches. The island is essentially a series of terraces around a central plateau, with the lower terraces having the highest and steepest cliffs. The Christmas Island National Park comprises about 64 per cent of this island, around 85 square kilometres of the 135-square-kilometre island.
Cocos (Keeling) Islands: Maps of Cocos	24 June 2014	Boschen Design	The first European sighting of the Cocos (Keeling) Islands is thought to have been in 1609, by Englishman Captain William Keeling of the East India Company. Soon after, the two atolls that comprise the islands started to appear on maps. These stamps show details of various Italian, French, Dutch and English maps over 400 years from the 17th to the 20th centuries. Each stamp is composed of various maps from a particular century: 17th, 18th, 19th and 20th.
100th Anniversary First Air Mail	1 July 2014	Jo Mure	On 16–18 July 2014 it will be 100 years since French aviator Maurice Guillaux (1883–1917) made the first air mail flight in Australia. He left the Melbourne Agricultural Grounds at 9.12am on 16 July bound for Sydney, stopping at Seymour, Wangaratta, Albury, Wagga Wagga, Harden, Goulburn and Liverpool en route. Strong head winds at Harden twice necessitated his return, as well as an overnight stay. While Moss Vale was on his original itinerary, the lack of a suitable landing space on the golf course saw him continue on to nearby Liverpool before reaching his final destination. He landed at Moore Park (Sydney Sports Ground) at 2.50pm on 18 July, two days after his departure from Melbourne; the flying time, however, was just 9 1/4 hours. On his arrival, Guillaux was welcomed by Governor-General Sir Ronald Munro Ferguson.
Royal Visit	8 July 2014	Simon Sakinofsky	The 10-day visit to Australia by the Duke and Duchess of Cambridge began when the family arrived in Sydney with HRH Prince George of Cambridge on 16 April 2014.
Equestrian Event	15 July 2014	Phil Ellett and John White	Horses first arrived in Australia with the First Fleet, in 1788, with one stallion, three mares, one colt and two fillies on board. Since that time, three breeds of horse have been developed in this country: the Waler, the Australian Stock Horse and the Australian Pony.
Australia - Norfolk Island Joint Issu	22 July 2014	Melinda Coombes	Norfolk Island is a small island in the Pacific Ocean some 1,400 kilometres east of the Australian mainland. Originally settled by Polynesians, in 1788 the island was colonised by Great Britain and subsequently used as a British penal colony. In 1856 the inhabitants of the overcrowded Pitcairn Island, including many of the descendants of the original Bounty mutineers, were resettled on Norfolk Island. In 1914 Norfolk Island was proclaimed an external territory of the Commonwealth of Australia and now enjoys a substantial degree of self-government. Since 1947 Norfolk Island has been responsible for its own postal service and postage stamps. This joint stamp issue features the endemic Norfolk Island Pine Araucaria heterophylla, a symbol of the island which is also widely grown in Australia as an ornamental tree, particularly in coastal regions.
Centenary of Military Aviation and Submarines	5 August 2014	Sonia Young, Jamie and Leanne Tufrey	This year marks two significant Australian military centenaries. On 1 March 1914 the first flight of a military airplane took place when Lieutenant Eric Harrison flew Bristol Military Biplane CFS-3 at the Army flying field, Point Cook, Victoria. Australia subsequently became the only British dominion to establish a flying corps, the Australian Flying Corps (AFC) for service during World War I. Australia's first submarines, British-built E-class vessels known as AE1 and AE2, were commissioned into the Royal Australian Navy in February 1914 and arrived in Sydney on 24 May. During World War I both submarines took part in the occupation of Rabaul in German New Guinea. On 14 September 1914 AE1 disappeared off the coast of Cape Gazelle, New Britain, tragically with all hands on board. AE2 subsequently supported British-led operations off the Gallipoli peninsula in Turkey and on 25 April 1915 was the first British submarine to penetrate the Dardanelles. On 30 April AE2 was damaged by a Turkish gunboat in the Sea of Marmara, and scuttled by her crew, all of whom were captured. AE2 was the only RAN vessel lost to enemy action during World War I.
Christmas Island Red Crab Migration	12 August 2014	Sonia Young	The annual Red Crab migration on Christmas Island is listed by naturalists as one of the most spectacular of all natural events. In the lead up to the wet season each year thousands of adult red crabs begin a hazardous migration from the forests to the coastline, where they will breed and spawn.
Nostalgic Advertisements	19 August 2014	Sonia Young	These 20th century advertisements recall a bygone era of both poster design and Australian manufacturing.
Southern Lights	26 August 2014	Lynda Wagner	The Southern Lights, formally known as the Aurora Australis, are the Southern Hemisphere's counterpart to the Northern Lights (Aurora Borealis). Auroras most commonly occur above a discrete band of high latitudes in each hemisphere, known as the auroral zones. Each of the auroral zones is centred on the Earth's magnetic poles and lies between latitudes of approximately 50˚ and 60˚. The Southern Lights are less commonly seen than their northern counterpart, as there are comparatively few populated regions under the auroral zone of the Southern Hemisphere.
Open Gardens Australia	2 September 2014	Simone Sakinofsky	Open Gardens Australia began life as Victoria's Gardens Scheme in 1987, broadening over the years to become a national program in 2000. It was formed to encourage an appreciation, knowledge and love of gardening among Australians. It actively pursues this objective by opening private gardens to public viewing and through a program of gardening events.
Australian Antarctic Territory: Era of the Husk	9 September 2014	Jo Mure	Huskies were first used in Antarctica by the British Antarctic Expedition in 1898–1900, led by Norwegian Carstens Borchgrevink. The 90 dogs came from Greenland and were managed by two dog handlers. Little more than a decade later, Australian explorer Douglas Mawson used huskies during his 1911–14 Australasian Antarctic Expedition. In harness, these powerful dogs can haul between 50 and 90 kilograms; usually working in teams, the number of dogs would be determined by the weight of the load to be hauled.
SCM 2014: Things that Sting	23 September 2014	Sharon Rodziewicz	Australia has numerous insects and animals that sting or bite as a form of defence. Some of these are extremely dangerous and sometimes fatal for humans, while others, despite their painful stings, rarely inflict serious damage. All of us should be respectful of our country's varied wildlife, learn to identify potentially dangerous creatures and take sensible precautions to avoid being stung or bitten. This stamp issue features six insects, reptiles and fish that can pack a painful punch if disturbed or threatened.
Wilderness Australia	1 October 2014	Janet Boschen	Australia's world-renowned natural assets include many regions of virtually untouched wilderness. This stamp issue, the second in a series, includes three areas noted for natural beauty and cultural significance. Victoria's Alpine National Park covers much of the higher areas of the Great Dividing Range, including Mount Bogong, subalpine woodland and the grasslands of the Bogong High Plains. The Blue Mountains National Park, located west of Sydney, is one of the country's most frequently visited parks, and includes the Three Sisters rock formation. Judbarra/Gregory National Park, the largest in the Northern Territory, boasts spectacular ranges, gorges, birdlife and rock art and incorporates the traditional lands of several Indigenous peoples.
Australian Racecourses	7 October 2014	Sonia Young	Horseracing in Australia stretches back to the early decades of European settlement in New South Wales, with the first official race taking place in Sydney's Hyde Park in 1810. While the sport was imported from Britain, in the Australian context this "sport of kings" was wrested from its upper-class connections to become a more egalitarian spectator sport.
Cocos (Keeling) Islands Sydney-Emden engagement	14 October 2014	John White and Stacey Zass	Australia's first victory at sea during World War I was also the first engagement fought by a warship of the fledgling Royal Australian Navy. The Battle of Cocos took place on 9 November 1914 when the Australian light cruiser HMAS Sydney responded to an attack by the German light cruiser SMS Emden on a communications station at Direction Island in the Cocos (Keeling) Islands. While Emden was the first to fire, Sydney's more powerful guns resulted in Emden's eventual surrender after she was deliberately beached on the North Keeling Island reef. There were fatalities on both sides, including 134 crew from Emden and four from Sydney.
A Century of Service: the ADF	21 October 2014	Tim Hancock	This year, we commemorate the centenary of the outbreak of World War I, "the war to end all wars". This stamp issue honours the contribution made by our defence services over the last century. The Australian Defence Force (ADF) comprises the Royal Australian Navy (RAN), the Australian Army and the Royal Australian Air Force (RAAF). The Commonwealth Naval Force and the Australian Army were established shortly after Federation in 1901. In 1911 King George V granted the title of Royal Australian Navy. The Army established the Australian Flying Corps in 1912 which was reconstituted in Australia after World War I as the Australian Air Corps. This body was in turn separated from the Army in 1921 to form the Royal Australian Air Force, becoming the second air force to be formed in the world. In 1976 the three services were integrated into the ADF. Throughout its history the three arms of the ADF have participated in major conflicts including World War I, World War II, the Korean War, the Vietnam War and more recently, in Afghanistan and Iraq.
Christmas Island Christmas	31 October 2014	Lisa Christensen and Gavin Ryan	These whimsical stamps show Santa Claus visiting the island at Christmas time. He pauses on the beach, located at the edge of the rainforest, to exchange gifts with an assortment of the island's wildlife residents, including Red Crabs, Robber Crabs and a supercilious Abbott's Booby. The animals have decorated a shoreline rock with ornaments from the sea, and Santa's reindeer waits patiently in the background with the sleigh.
Christmas 2014	31 October 2014	Andrew Hogg and Jo Mure	This year's religious stamps are based on stained-glass windows in St Patrick's Cathedral, Melbourne. This imposing bluestone building is both the tallest and largest church building in Australia and one of the world's largest Gothic revival 19th-century churches—only St Patrick's Cathedral in New York is comparable. Designed by Englishman and Catholic convert William Wardell, St Patrick's was one of his earliest commissions. Begun in 1858, the cathedral was not completely finished until 1939, the delay due to the depression of the 1890s as well as shortage of funds during construction. St Patrick's Cathedral was consecrated in 1897 and dedicated to the patron saint of Ireland.

=== 2015 ===
Stamp	Date	Designer	Background Information
Lunar New Year 2015 - Year of the Goat	8 January 2015	Dani Poon and Lisa Christensen	The Chinese Zodiac is made up of a 12-year cycle, and Chinese animal signs are used for dating the years. For festive seasons, such as the New Year, the Chinese Lunar Calendar is used. Accordingly, the Year of the Goat begins on 19 February 2015 and concludes on 7 February 2016. The element is wood and the lucky colour is green.
Native Animals	13 January 2015	Sharon Rodziewicz	The stocky Common Wombat (Vombatus ursinus) and the Eastern Grey Kangaroo (Macropus giganteus) are both found in the south-eastern parts of Australia. The Koala (Phascolarctos cinereus) lives in eucalyptus forests along the eastern seaboard, and the endangered Numbat (Myrmecobius fasciatus) is a small, striped marsupial confined in the wild to the south-west of Western Australia. The carnivorous Tasmanian Devil (Sarcophilus harrisii) has been threatened by Devil Facial Tumour Disease for the last two decades. The Short-beaked Echidna (Tachyglossus aculeatus) feeds largely on ants and termites and is found throughout Australia. Like the Platypus (the only other monotreme), the Echidna lays eggs rather than gives birth to live young.
The First Victoria Cross	22 January 2015	Lynette Traynor	The issue commemorates the first Victoria Crosses awarded to Australians. These were awarded in 1900 and 1901 during the Second Boer War (1899–1902). The Victoria Cross (VC) is a military decoration awarded for valour "in the presence of the enemy". It may be awarded to a person of any rank in any service, and to civilians under military command.
Australian Legends: The Victoria Cross	22 January 2015	Simone Sakinofsky	Since 1997 the annual Australian Legends Award honours eminent living Australians who have made a lasting contribution to Australian identity and way of life. The Award itself includes a gold replica stamp presented to each recipient at an Australia Day lunch. Past recipients have included Sir Donald Bradman, Medical Scientists, Barry Humphries, Philanthropists, Fashion Legends, Legends of the Screen, and Legends of Cooking.
Love Is In The Air	3 February 2015	Jonathan Chong and Sonia Young	The heart is quite simply the most iconic love symbol of all. The exchange of heart-shaped Valentines is believed to have gained popularity in Victorian England. This issue of stamps, for special occasions and everyday use, is a fresh and contemporary take on the subject of love and the love-heart form. Each stamp presents a heart-shaped object, floating in a panorama of blue sky and fluffy white clouds. There is a heart-shaped kite, sky-writing smoke trail, hot-air balloon and cloud. The stamps convey a sense that love is something limitless, uplifting and exciting; that love is about to happen; that love really is 'in the air'.
Era of Sail: Clipper Ships	17 February 2015	Lisa Christensen	Clipper ships were very fast sailing ships widely used in the mid-19th century. They were fast, yacht-like vessels, with three masts and a square rig. They were generally narrow for their length, could carry limited bulk freight, small by later 19th century standards, and had a large total sail area. Clipper ships were mostly constructed in British and American shipyards.
Tourist Transport	3 March 2015	John White	Visitors flocking to some of Australia's most beautiful destinations can board a range of transport vehicles for sightseeing tours. This stamp issue is a sequel to the 2012 issue Capital City Transport.
Australian Trees	17 March 2015	Mary Callahan and Jo Mure	The trees have not previously been represented on Australian stamps. The issue is a companion to the 2005 Australian Trees stamp issue.
Cocos (Keeling) Islands - Birds of Cocos	24 March 2015	Owen Bell and John White	The Cocos (Keeling) Islands comprises 27 islands in two atoll groups, with a total land area of about 14 square kilometres. North Keeling Island is a horseshoe-shaped single-island atoll; the other 26 islands form the southern atoll, with only Home and West Islands being populated.
Queen's Birthday	7 April 2015	Simone Sakinofsky	This stamp issue commemorates the Queen's Birthday 2015. Australia Post has been issuing a stamp to commemorate the Queen's birthday since 1980.
ANZAC: Australia - NZ joint issue	7 April 2015	Sonia Young	This stamp issue commemorates the formation and service of the Australian and New Zealand Army Corps (ANZAC), which was formed in Egypt in the months prior to deployment to Gallipoli and disbanded following that campaign. This stamp issue has been developed in collaboration with New Zealand. For both countries, an important strand of identity was formed in the trenches of Gallipoli and it remains a touchstone of national identity. Charles Bean, Australia's official correspondent and historian of the Great War, is in large part responsible for shaping the Anzac legend that Australians are familiar with today, leading to its popular embrace and broad application.
WWI - Centenary of Gallipoli	14 April 2015	Janet Boschen	This stamp issue is the second in a five-year series commemorating World War I, each issue relating the centenary year in which it is released. This second issue focuses on Gallipoli, a campaign that would in time be seen as crucial in shaping Australian national consciousness. The Gallipoli campaign falls into four phases: the landing, the Turkish counter-attack, the British offensive and the withdrawal. These events spanned 25 April 1915 to 8 January 1916, and are represented on the stamps, along with field medicine.
Cats	6 May 2015	Jonathan Chong	This stamp issue provides a snapshot of domestic cat ownership in Australia. Cats are the second-most popular pet nationally in terms of ownership (the dog being the most popular).
Collections Australia	19 May 2015	Gary Domoney	Museums are essential to the heritage of any country, region and town. These treasure houses are fundamental to collecting, preserving and exhibiting objects and stories; to shaping a sense of belonging; and to generating research that builds knowledge and enables technological innovation and development. Museum collections vary widely in their focus. In Australia they might been seen to fall loosely into the areas of contact and colonial history, social history, Indigenous culture and ethnography, natural history, physical sciences, and design and technology; but they cover many areas in between.
Colours of the Australian Antarctic Territory	26 May 2015	Jo Mure	Only two of the world's continents lie entirely within the Southern Hemisphere: Australia and Antarctica. Australia lies quite close to the equator, while Antarctica is situated about the South Geographic Pole. Antarctica is almost entirely covered by an ice sheet. In extreme weather snow blizzards can cause whiteout, an optical phenomenon in which uniform light conditions effectively make it impossible to distinguish shadows, landmarks or the horizon. This can occur when the snow cover is unbroken and the sky is overcast. Whiteout is a serious hazard as it causes a loss of perspective and direction.
Islands of Australia	2 June 2015	Jo Mure	Australia comprises more than 8,000 islands, including the island state of Tasmania. This special stamp issue presents four spectacular Australian islands, showcasing their diverse and interesting terrain at ground level.
Centenary of the Walter and Eliza Hall Institute of Medical Research	30 June 2015	Nicholas Girling and Simon Sakinofsky	The Walter and Eliza Hall Institute of Medical Research is Australia's oldest medical research institute, celebrating 100 years of discoveries for humanity in 2015.
100 Years of Commonwealth Management of Lighthouses	7 July 2015	Stacey Zass	This stamp issue commemorates 100 years of Commonwealth Management of Lighthouses. Transfer of control from the states the Commonwealth took place on 1 July 1915 when the Lighthouses Act 1911 came into effect.
Great Australian Walks	14 July 2015	MDM Design and Sharon Rodziewicz	The varied and spectacular terrain of Australia is a bushwalkers' paradise. From the mountains to the Red Centre, the coast to the forest, this issue features four of the many popular walking tracks for hikers that traverse the country.
Netball World Cup Sydney 2015	4 August 2015	Jo Mure	The Netball World Cup is the ultimate prize in international netball. This commemorative stamp issue celebrates Netball World Cup SYDNEY 2015, held between 7 and 16 August 2015 at Sydney Olympic Park.
Australia, New Zealand and Singapore joint issue	14 August 2015	Sonia Young	This joint issue with New Zealand and Singapore is being released to mark the 50th anniversary of bilateral relations between Singapore and Australia, and Singapore and New Zealand. Singapore gained independence from Britain in 1963, uniting with other former British territories in the region to become part of the Federation of Malaysia. In the wake of administrative and ideological disputes, Singapore was expelled from the federation on 9 August 1965, becoming an independent nation in its own right.
Island of Cocos (Keeling)	25 August 2015	Lisa Christensen	Situated in the Indian Ocean some 2,700 kilometres north-west of Perth, the Cocos (Keeling) Islands is a group of 27 islands in two atolls, with a latitude of 12° 10’ and longitude of 96° 50’. They have a total land area of about 14 square kilometres and a highest elevation of just five metres. The two coral atolls have developed on the peaks of two volcanic seamounts in an underwater range rising from about 5,000 metres and extending north-east beyond Christmas Island, about 900 kilometres away. The chain of seamounts exemplify the sequence of events that result in atoll formation; consequently, they were the only coral atolls that Charles Darwin visited in 1836 when he developed his theory on the subject of atoll formation.
Birth of a Princess	25 August 2015	Jo Mure	Her Royal Highness Princess Charlotte of Cambridge was born at 8.34 BST on 2 May 2015. The second child of Their Royal Highnesses Catherine, Duchess of Cambridge and William, Duke of Cambridge, the baby princess was born in the Lindo Wing of St Mary's Hospital, London and weighed 8 pounds 3 ounces (3.7 kilograms).
Sign of the Times	1 September 2015	John White	This stamp issue celebrates three heritage-listed signs from the golden age of neon advertising in Australia, the 1930s to the 1960s.
The Dogs that Saved Macquarie Island	9 September 2015	Simone Sakinofsky	The World Heritage–listed Macquarie Island has significant biodiversity and is one of the few breeding locations for fauna in the Southern Ocean sector of the Pacific. But introduced non-native species have impacted seriously on its natural flora and fauna. In an effort to address this, Macquarie has been the focus of two intensive pest eradication program in recent years: the first, to rid the island of cats, and, more recently, to rid it of rabbits, ship rats and mice.
Long May She Reign	9 September 2015	Sonia Young	On 9 September 2015, Her Majesty Queen Elizabeth II became the longest-reigning British monarch in history.
Our Solar System: SCM 2015	22 September 2015	Jo Mure	This year Australia Post celebrates its 2015 Stamp Collecting Month (SCM) with the launch of the 'Our Solar System' stamp collection. The 'Our Solar System' stamps feature the eight spectacular planets that orbit the Sun. These celestial wonders of the Solar System were formed about 4.6 billion years ago.
Honoured by Australia	5 October 2015	Sonia Young	This special stamp issue features three international humanitarians, all of whom have been officially honoured by Australia for their acts of courage, compassion and leadership: Nelson Mandela, Mother Teresa and Raoul Wallenberg.
Bicycles	13 October 2015	Sean Pethick and Sharon Rodziewicz	At the end of the 1910s and on the back off the late-19th-century cycling craze, bicycles were the most popular form of individualised transport in Australia. But once the car became an affordable option, the popularity of the metal steed dipped. Today, cycling is again embraced, with around 55% of Australian households owning at least one bike in working order.
A Centenary of Service: Animals in War	27 October 2015	Lisa Christensen	In the lead-up to Remembrance Day, Australia Post will commemorate the valour and sacrifice made by countless animals during Australia's involvement in war with the release this new stamp issue.
Christmas Island Christmas 2015	30 October 2015	Stuart McLachlan and Sonia Young	Located in the Indian Ocean some 2,600 kilometres northwest of Perth, Christmas Island is the sole peak of an underwater mountain range rising above the ocean's surface.
Christmas 2015	30 October 2015	John White	Australia Post has issued Christmas stamps every year since 1957, and again this year we present both religious and secular themes.

=== 2016 ===
Stamp	Date	Designer	Background Information
Amazing wildflowers of the west	6 January 2016	Simone Sakinofsky	Think of wildflowers and at some point your mind will inevitably turn to the west! Why? Because Western Australia is home to some of the most spectacular wildflowers in the world. And it's rich in more than minerals too – over 10,000 species of plants have been discovered there. WA is known as the Wildflower State for good reason.
Australian Legends of Singles Tennis	21 January 2016	Sonia Young	Eleven of Australia's most loved and celebrated singles tennis players have been honoured by Australia Post as the recipients of the 2016 Australia Post Legends Award.
Christmas Island Lunar New Year - Year of the Monkey 2016	3 February 2016	Dani Poon	The Christmas Island Lunar New Year: Year of the Monkey 2016 stamp issue, released on 3 February 2016, features the mischievous Monkey in calligraphic and pictorial form.
1966-2016 Decimal Currency Australia	9 February 2016	Melinda Coombes	Many people may well remember the introduction of decimal currency on Monday 14 February 1966, which was known at the time as "C-Day" (Conversion Day). The replacement of pounds, shillings and pence with dollars and cents was a momentous change that affected key aspects of daily life in Australia.
Fair Dinkum Aussie Alphabet: N, Q, S, V & W	1 March 2016	Gavin Young	Australian humour is recognised around the world for its dry, ironic and self-deprecating nature. And while in Australia, we don't see what all of the fuss is about, sometimes this humour, combined with our unique lexicon and the slow, broad drawl of our accent, can cause some confusion.
Australian Bridges	15 March 2016	Seth Pethick and Lisa Christensen	Bridges are primarily built for road and rail transport as well as for pedestrian travel, but they are also amazing feats of engineering and construction.
Queen's 90th Birthday	5 April 2016	Sharon Rodziewicz	The Queen's Birthday 2016 stamp issue, released on 5 April 2016, celebrates the 90th birthday of Her Majesty Queen Elizabeth II. Such an occasion feels like the right time to take a look at Queen's Birthday stamps in Australia.
Centenary of WWI: 1916	12 April 2016	Andrew Hogg and Jane Boschen	The Centenary of WWI: 1916 stamp issue, released on 12 April 2016, brings us to the point in the war when the Anzacs travelled to the Western Front.
Christmas Island: Robber Crabs	26 April 2016	Sharon Rodziewicz	While Christmas Island is famous for its endemic red crabs (the migration of which was the subject of a 2014 Christmas Island stamp issue), it is also home to the largest terrestrial arthropod on earth – the Robber Crab (Birgus latro), also known as the Coconut Crab. In fact, Christmas Island hosts the largest and best protected Robber Crab population in the world.
Beautiful Butterflies	3 May 2016	Sharon Rodziewicz	Butterflies are fascinating. They are fleeting in nature, yet scientifically important (particularly as indicators of whether habitat is under threat) and they are often strikingly beautiful.
Cocos (Keeling) Islands Dolphins	17 May 2016	Simone Sakinofsky	The Cocos (Keeling) Islands: Dolphins stamp issue, released on 17 May 2016, features photographs of three playful and sociable dolphin species that are seen around the islands: the Common Dolphin (Delphinus delphis), the Spinner Dolphin (Stenella longirostris) and the Indo-Pacific Bottlenose Dolphin (Tursiops aduncus).
RSL 1916-2016	31 May 2016	Janet Boschen and John White	Formed in June 1916, to care for the welfare of servicemen returning from World War I, the Returned & Services League of Australia (RSL) is Australia's largest ex-service organisation. There are 170,000 traditional and affiliate members. 2016 marks its centenary, and Australia Post is commemorating this important occasion with the release of the RSL 1916–2016 stamp issue on 31 May.
Nostalgic Fruit Labels	7 June 2016	Jo Mure	At the beginning of the 20th century, Australia's primary production industries expanded at a great rate, which in turn led Australia to become a major exporter of food, including fresh fruit.
Hurley's Journey 1914-1916	21 June 2016	Sonia Young	Photographing the Imperial Trans-Antarctic Expedition
Australian Gold Medalists: London 2012 Olympic Games	23 July 2016	Simone Sakinofsky	Australia Post is very pleased to recognise the gold-medal performance of Jared Tallent. Following the disqualification of Russian Sergey Kirdyapkin, Tallent has been belatedly awarded gold for the 50 km walk at the London 2012 Games.
Owls: Guardians of the Night	5 July 2016	Christopher Pope and Sharon Rodziewicz	On 5 July 2016, Australia Post released its latest stamp issue, Owls: Guardians of the Night. Featuring naturalistic illustrations by Adelaide-based wildlife artist Christopher Pope, the issue depicts four of these magnificent birds of prey on double-definitive-sized $1 stamps: Sooty Owl (Tyto tenebricosa), Rufous Owl (Ninox rufa), Eastern Grass Owl (Tyto longimembris) and Southern Boobook (Ninox boobook lurida). Each owl is pictured within its natural habitat.
50 Years of Play School	26 July 2016	Jonathan Chong	Play School is Australia's longest running children's television program. The 50 Years of Play School stamp issue celebrates half a century of this much-loved Australian television program.
Road to Rio	2 August 2016	Simone Sakinofsky	Between 5 and 21 August 2016, Rio de Janeiro, the carnival city of Brazil, will host the Games of the XXXI Olympiad. This will be the first time a South American city has played host to the Games in the 120-year history of the modern Olympic era. It is also the first time since the Sydney 2000 Games that Olympians will converge on a Southern Hemisphere host city.
Australian Gold Medalists: Rio 2016 Olympic Games	5 August 2016	John White	For each Australian gold medal performance at the Rio 2016 Olympic Games to date, Australia Post has produced a stamp in a sheetlet of 10. The stamp designs feature the athletes at their medal presentation ceremonies and have been made available for purchase within days of each presentation ceremony.
Fair Dinkum Aussie Alphabet Part 2	16 August 2016	Gavin Ryan and Sonia Young	On 16 August 2016, part two of the Fair Dinkum Aussie Alphabet stamp series will be released. Once again, Artist Gavin Ryan has created some highly amusing and quintessentially ocker scenes, based on each letter of the alphabet.
Jewel Beetles	6 September 2016	Owen Bell and Jo Mure	Adult jewel beetles generally only live between one day and two weeks. Like butterflies, they are fleeting yet beautiful. During the warmer months, you might spy them on the flowers of native trees and shrubs, in various forests, woodlands and desert environments throughout Australia. However, you may have to look closely, as jewel beetles are generally quite small. While most species are under 20 millimetres in length, they can range in size from three to 80 millimetres.
Dirk Hartog 400 years	13 September 2016	Sharon Rodziewicz	The story of Captain James Cook and his landing at Botany Bay in 1770 is a well-known event in Australian history. However, Cook was not the first European explorer to land here. There were many explorers who had already made landfall on the great southern continent during the 17th century, including several Dutch seamen from the Dutch East India Company (VOC).
Australian Antarctic Territory: Ice Flowers	20 September 2016	Sharon Rodziewicz	The Australian Antarctic Territory (AAT) has three-year-round research stations, Mawson, Davis and Casey, which are administered by the Hobart-based Australian Antarctic Division. During the winter months, temperatures on these research stations frequently fall below −40 °C. This is the perfect environment for ice flowers – also known as ice ferns – to flourish.
Norfolk Island Seabirds	20 September 2016	John White	Norfolk Island is home to a number of bird species, including over 20 species of seabirds that can be seen from coastal areas, including popular vantage points Captain Cook Monument and Bird Rock. Nepean Island, Phillip Island and the smaller islets off the Norfolk coastline are important breeding areas for these interesting and varied seabird species.
Endangered Wildlife SCM 2016	20 September 2016	Owen Bell and Sonia Young	October is Australia Post's Stamp Collecting Month (SCM). SCM is for everyone who loves stamps – young and old! It's a great way for parents and grandparents to share their love of stamps with their children and grandchildren; and it's an ideal way for teachers to engage their students via an educational theme.
Australian Animals Monotremes	26 September 2016	Mary Callahan Design	Echidnas and Platypuses are the only surviving monotremes (egg-laying mammals) in the world. Monotremes share many similarities with other placental mammals: they are warm-blooded, covered in hair and produce milk to feed their young.
A Century of Service: Vietnam War	11 October 2016	Andrew Hogg	The Vietnam War (1955–75) was fought between communist North Vietnam, which sought to unify the country after the partition that resulted from the First Indochina War (1946–54), and South Vietnam, which was backed by anti-communist USA. While Australia did not enter the war until 1962, it was to become our longest conflict of the 20th century.
Art of Cocos (Keeling Islands)	18 October 2016	Lisa Christensen and Cara Ratajczak	This stamp issue celebrates creative culture on Cocos (Keeling) Islands. The Big Barge Art Centre, housed in a restored former working barge, is a local hub for fostering traditional and non-traditional art-making.
Christmas Island Christmas 2016	31 October 2016	Shane MacGowan and Sonia Young	Christmas Island is an external Australian territory located in the Indian Ocean some 2,600 kilometres north-west of Perth. The lush, tropical island is volcanic in origin, with an important natural history. It is home to unique vegetation, iconic seabirds, and land crab populations of world significance. Christmas Island National Park, which comprises 85 square kilometers of the total landmass of 135 square kilometers, was declared in 1980.
Christmas 2016	31 October 2016	Stuart McLachlan	Australia has issued Christmas stamps annually since 1957 and was the first country in the world to commence an annual program. The current Christmas stamp program represents the Christmas holiday as we know it in Australia today, spanning both religious and secular themes.

=== 2017 ===
Stamp	Date	Designer	Background Information
Christmas Island: Year of the Rooster 2017	10 January 2017	Ms Dani Poon	Lunar New Year 2017 celebrates the beginning of the Year of the Rooster. The Rooster is the tenth sign in the 12-year Chinese Zodiac cycle. The well-groomed Rooster is known to be confident, observant, resourceful and courageous. The Rooster is considered persistent and reliable, especially as they are the announcers of the new dawn. The loyal and honest Rooster likes to be surrounded by others. Roosters are also multi-talented and hardworking, which is why they are suited to a career as a salesperson, athlete, surgeon, journalist or teacher. Their courage may also lead them to serve as a police officer, soldier or fireman.
Norfolk Island Waterfalls	17 January 2017	Simone Sakinofsky	Cascade Creek is one of Norfolk Island's few permanent streams. Along with its tributaries, its catchment area covers almost one-fifth of the island and is an important home for native wetland flora and fauna. When it rains, high flows produce two main waterfalls: Cockpit Waterfall and Cascade Creek Falls.
Love	2 September 2017	Gary Domoney and Sonia Young	The heart and the red rose have long been symbols of love and devotion. In the 13th century the French poem Roman de la Rose identified the rose with romantic passion and in 1794, Scotland's bard, Robert Burns, famously compared his sweetheart to this exquisite bloom. This stamp issue introduces two new designs for social mail users and event organisers.
Australian Jetties	21 February 2017	Andrew Hogg	Many of the countless jetties and piers that punctuate Australia's coastline and waterways were originally built to moor vessels transporting goods and passengers. While some have since fallen into disuse, others are still popular for recreational fishing, diving, snorkelling and other tourist activities. The four featured jetties from around the country, all wooden, include those at Busselton, Western Australia; Tumby Bay, South Australia; Shelley Beach near Portsea, Victoria; and Kincumber, New South Wales.
Australian Antarctic Territory: Antarctic Deep Sea Creatures	7 March 2017	Stacey Zass	The Australian Antarctic Territory is located 3,000 kilometres to the south of the Australian continent. The huge continent of Antarctica occupies 13.5 million square kilometres and of this area the vast Australian Antarctic Territory makes up around six million square kilometres. This region, almost entirely covered with permanent ice and snow, is equivalent to around 75 per cent of the land mass of Australia.
Rare Beauties	30 March 2017	Sonia Young	Throughout history, gemstones have been used for personal adornment, ritual practices and as status symbols. During this time the cutting of gemstones has evolved from a limited practice using simple tools into a complex art that uses sophisticated technology to reveal a mineral's hidden beauty. To be transformed into gemstones, minerals need the following qualities: hardness (resistance to scratches and general wear), beauty (colour, clarity and lustre) and rarity. The minerals must be large enough for cutting and the deposits rich enough to warrant the costs of extraction.
Arthur Streeton and Sidney Nolan	30 March 2017	Lynette Traynor	This commemorative issue of two stamps celebrates the sesquicentenary of the birth of Sir Arthur Streeton and the centenary of the birth of Sir Sidney Nolan.
Queen's Birthday 2017	4 April 2017	Simone Sakinofsky	The 2017 Queen's Birthday stamp issue celebrates the 91st birthday of Her Majesty Queen Elizabeth II.
Centenary of WWI: 1917	18 April 2017	Phil Ellett and Sonia Young	This stamp issue is the fourth in a five-year series commemorating World War I, each issue relating to the centenary year in which it is released. The five stamps in this issue, designed by Phil Ellett of Creative Ethos, highlight some key themes and events of 1917: the Australian Flying Corps, which entered the skies above the Western Front in 1917; the costly Third Battle of Ypres; the crucial support for the troops by an army of, largely, women on the home front; the Sinai–Palestine campaign, waged by mounted troops; and the work of war correspondent Charles Bean.
Caves	2 May 2017	Jo Mure	Caves are important, yet often fragile, natural subterranean environments. Caves not only house minerals and speleothems, but also often provide a home for rare fauna and ancient fossil deposits.
Street Art	16 May 2017	Unknown	In recent decades there has been an explosion of art practice in our urban environments. Street art describes public artistic expression that appears outside traditional art venues, such as galleries.
1967 Referendum	24 May 2017	Rachael Sarra	Prior to the historic 1967 federal referendum, Aboriginal and Torres Strait Islander peoples did not have the same rights as other Australians under the constitution: the federal government could make special laws in relation to any Australians other than Aboriginal and Torres Strait Islander people, who were instead subject to the varying and often highly discriminatory laws of state governments.
Australian Legends 2017	29 May 2017	Lynette Traynor	The Australia Post Australian Legends Award recognises individuals who have shaped Australian society and identity in a variety of positive ways. In 2017, we honour three remarkable Indigenous leaders: Tom Calma, Lowitja O’Donoghue and Galarrwuy Yunupingu. These highly respected elders have been tireless in their lifelong efforts to improve social and economic outcomes for Aboriginal and Torres Strait Islander peoples. Together, their work has spanned the areas of land rights, economics, self-determination, health, welfare, education and reconciliation.
Garden Fruits of Cocos	30 May 2017	Anita Xhafer	On Home Island, in the Cocos (Keeling) Islands, many locals maintain fruit gardens at home. They are filled with bright orange drinking coconuts and red bananas as well as the four fruits featured on these vibrant stamps: West Indian lime, rose apple, sapodilla and breadfruit.
Centenary of Lions Club International	7 June 2017	Lynda Warner	In 2017, the largest community service organisation in the world, Lions Clubs International, celebrates its centenary. Australia Post has issued a stamp in acknowledgement of this important milestone.
Henry Lawson: 1867-1922	13 March 2017	Jamie and Leanne Tufrey, and Jo Mure	Henry Lawson (1867–1922) was a writer and poet, who was known as the "Poet of the People". His writing was distinctly Australian, with stories, characters and language that reflected various aspects of Australian life and identity, both pre and post Federation, including republicanism, poverty and his own experiences in the outback. Along with his contemporary Banjo Patterson, Lawson is an important figure in Australia's early literary culture. He is remembered and critically acclaimed for his short stories, though he did also publish many poems.
Australian Succulents	20 June 2017	Attila and Michele Kapitany	Succulent plants occur through most regions in Australia and in every state and territory. They can be found in coastal, inland, temperate, subtropical and tropical environments, and prefer seasonally dry or semi-arid conditions. While the popular conception of these plants is that they are groundcovers or low-growing, this group also includes orchids, hoyas, shrubs and even the boab, or the bottle tree.
Trans-Australian Railway: 1917-2017	4 July 2017	John White	In 2017, it will be 100 years since the completion of the 1,690-kilometre transcontinental railway between Port Augusta, in South Australia, and Kalgoorlie, in Western Australia.
Norfolk Island Flowers	18 July 2017	Sharon Rodziewicz	Norfolk Island is located in the Pacific Ocean around 1,400 kilometres east of the Australian mainland. Together with small islets Phillip Island and Nepean Island it forms one of Australia's external territories.
Dragonflies: SCM 2017	1 August 2017	Owen Bell	Dragonflies (Order Odonata) are among the most beautiful and captivating creatures of the insect world. Faster than most other flying insects, they hover weightless mid-air before darting at speed, which in the case of some species can be up to 70 kilometres per hour.
Christmas Island Early Voyages	15 August 2017	Sonia Young	The first recorded sighting of Christmas Island occurred in 1615, by Richard Rowe, master of the Thomas. This stamp issue looks at two other significant early voyages in the early history of Christmas Island. The first involves Captain William Mynors, who sailed past in 1643 and named the island "Christmas Island". The second is the voyage of William Dampier (and Captain Charles Swan) aboard the Cygnet, which resulted in the first recorded visit ashore, in 1688.
Shripwrecks	29 August 2017	Simone Sakinofsky	Since the 1600s more than 8,000 shipwrecks have been recorded as occurring in Australian waters, of which only one-quarter have been located. Once located, however, wrecks and their relics reveal much about life on board the ship, the competence of the crew, and the social, political and commercial climate in which each journey took place.
Heard Island	5 September 2017	Melinda Combes	Subantarctic Heard Island is a 368-square-kilometre volcanic island located in the middle of the vast Southern Ocean, about 4,000 kilometres south-west of mainland Australia. It is the largest island in the external Australian Territory of Heard Island and McDonald Islands (HIMI). The island group became an external Australian territory in 1947, the same year Australia mounted the first Australian National Antarctic Research Expedition to Heard Island, though recent research activity has been infrequent.
50th Anniversary WRESAT	12 September 2017	Nigel Buchanan and Jo Mure	Fifty years ago, on 29 November 1967, Australia launched its first satellite, WRESAT (Weapons Research Establishment Satellite), from the Woomera Rocket Range in South Australia. The satellite was designed, constructed and launched in just 11 months in a collaboration between the Weapons Research Establishment Salisbury (now Defence Science and Technology Group Edinburgh) and the University of Adelaide. The WRESAT project was made possible by the donation of a launch vehicle by an American-led research project being conducted at Woomera as well as their offer to assist in the launch.
Australian Antarctic Territory: Cultural Heritage	12 September 2017	Lynda Warner	Cultural heritage provides a framework for interpreting the past and understanding continuing cultural practices. It can encompass tangible items such as artefacts and coins, and even landscapes, archaeological sites and monuments. Cultural heritage may also include intangible items such as oral traditions and rituals.
Norfolk Island Convict Heritage	19 September 2017	Jo Mure	This stamp issue presents two historic sites from the second penal colony established on Norfolk Island between 1825 and 1855: the New Gaol, completed in 1847, and the Prisoners Barracks, completed in 1835. Both structures were quarried for buildings materials when the Pitcairn Islanders arrived as settlers, in 1856. So while only the arched entrance and perimeter walls of these sites remain standing, both symbolise the unforgiving conditions experienced by convicts sent to Norfolk Island.
Concession Post	2 October 2017	Unknown	Australia Post Concession stamps are special non-denominational stamps that enable eligible concession card holders to receive a reduced rate on domestic postage, up to a certain value each year. A limited number of these stamps, when issued, are also made available to philatelic collectors in the form of special products.
A Century of Service: Women in War	6 October 2017	Unknown	This issue, the fourth in a series commemorating a century of service since World War I, acknowledges the role of women in war and conflict. Prior to and including World War I, the involvement of women in conflict zones was almost entirely limited to nursing. Since then, women's roles have diversified and today all roles in the Australian Defence Force are open to women.
Fair Dinkum Aussie Alphabet part 3	17 October 2017	Gavin Ryan	The Fair Dinkum Aussie Alphabet series of stamps takes a light-hearted look at Australia through our cultural icons, inventions, places, characters, flora, and fauna and more. It explores our unique brand of "Aussie" humour and showcases our ability to laugh at ourselves. Each letter of the alphabet has its own stamp that is filled with elements starting with that letter. The idea is to identify as many as possible and string together a good old Aussie yarn.
Art of the North	24 October 2017	Banduk Marika and Bede Tungutalum	This special issue of four stamps features works by two eminent artists from the northern regions of Australia's Northern Territory, Banduk Marika and Bede Tungutalum.
Cocos (Keeling) Islands: Aviation	31 October 2017	Jamie and Leanne Tufrey, and Simone Sakinofsky	Cocos (Keeling) Islands' connection with aviation began in 1939, with an Australian government survey flight directly linked to our postal history. The flight was made to determine the feasibility of an alternative airmail route to England in the event that war broke out in Asia. This was the first-ever flight across the Indian Ocean and carried a small number of unofficial postal items.
Christmas Island Christmas 2017	1 November 2017	Shane MacGowan	In recognition of Christmas Island's name (selected by Captain William Mynors, as he sailed past the island on Christmas Day, 1643), Christmas Island Christmas stamps have been issued every year, since 1984. They are a light-hearted take on Christmas in the southern hemisphere.
Christmas 2017	1 November 2017	Jo Mure	Each year, we release Christmas stamps that celebrate the Christmas holiday as we know it in Australia today, spanning both traditional and secular themes.

=== 2018 ===
Stamp	Date	Designer	Background Information
Christmas Island Year of the Dog 2018	8 January 2018	Dani Poon, Jason Watts and Jo Mure	The Dog is the 11th sign in the 12-sign Chinese zodiac cycle. Those born under the Dog sign are known to be independent, sincere, courageous and intelligent, as well as friendly and loving. According to the Chinese Lunar Calendar, the Year of the Dog runs from 16 February 2018 to 4 February 2019.
Convict Past	16 January 2018	Tim Hancock and John White	This stamp issue commemorates the end of convict transport to the Australian colonies. In January 2018, it will be 150 years since the last convict ship, the Hougoumont, docked in Australia, at the Swan River Colony in 1868. Between the arrival of the First Fleet, in 1778, and the cessation of convict transportation, some 165,000 convicts arrived here to be punished for their crimes, whether political activities or something as trivial as stealing a loaf of bread.
Australian Legends 2018	18 January 2018	Jason Watts	The Australia Post Australian Legends Award recognises individuals who have shaped Australian society and identity in a variety of positive ways. In 2018, we honour five much-loved television entertainers. These consummate performers have entertained, informed and delighted generations of Australians, transfixing television audiences across the country. Together they encompass a range of remarkable talents, from serious journalism to variety hosting, interviewing, singing, acting and comedy.
With Love	6 February 2018	Jeanette Fallon and Jo Mure	These charming stamps, the latest in our ongoing Special Occasions series, are designed to send love, affection or greetings to your nearest and dearest, whether they be friends, family or that special sweetheart.
Banksias	20 February 2018	Celia Rosser	The genus Banksia is a group of woody evergreens that ranges from prostrate shrubs to upright trees of up to 25 metres, with diverse foliage and large, complex flower heads. Each flower spike can comprise hundreds or even thousands of individual flowers; Banksia grandis, for example, has up to 6,000. Flower colouration ranges over a warm palette: cream, yellow, orange, yellow-green, red, pink and brown. Many species in this genus have a fire-tolerant trunk, from which growth will sprout following a bushfire; the trunks of others are thin-skinned and the species regenerate from seed following a fire.
Norfolk Island Golf	27 February 2018	Neil Walker and Jo Mure	Quality Row (originally named Military Road) dates back to 1825, when its elegant houses served as quarters for military and civil officers during the island's second penal settlement. No.1 Quality Row is now the clubhouse for the Norfolk Island Golf Club, making it one of the only golf clubs in the world located within a World Heritage Site (the Kingston and Arthurs Vale Historic Area). The course features Kikuyu fairways and 328 greens. Its position on the south-east side of the island provides lovely ocean views and challenging coastal breezes for those who play there.
Vintage Jam Labels	6 March 2018	Jo Mure	Jam was one of the first locally manufactured foods in Australia. At the beginning of the 20th century, Australia's primary production industries expanded at a great rate, leading Australia to become a major exporter of food, including fresh fruit, tinned fruit and tinned jam, particularly during the first quarter of the 20th century.
Finches of Australia	16 March 2018	Kevin Stead and John White	Australia is home to 19 species of finches, including mannikins and firetails. Also known as grass-finches, Australia's finches are separate from the Ploceidae, or true finches, of the Americas, Eurasia and Africa.
Gold Coast 2018 Commonwealth Games	20 March 2018	Sonia Young and John White	The Gold Coast 2018 Commonwealth Games (GC2018), which will take place from 4 to 15 April 2018, will be the fifth occasion Australia has played host to the "Friendly Games". The first Australian Games was in Sydney in 1938, followed by Perth in 1962, Brisbane in 1982 and Melbourne in 2006.
Australian Antarctic Territory Crabeater Seals	27 March 2018	Sonia Young	Seals, or pinnipeds, fall into two groups: true seals (phocid) and eared seals (otariid). Antarctica is home to six species: Ross, Leopard, Weddell, Crabeater, Antarctic Fur and Elephant seals.
A Century of Service: War Memorials	10 April 2018	Gary Domoney	War Memorials is the fifth and final stamp issue in the Century of Service stamp series. Previous issues are Tri-services (2014), War Animals (2015), Vietnam War (2016) and Women in War (2017). Each issue focuses on a different theme related to the Australian experience of war across the last century. This issue focuses on war memorials, both in Australia and internationally, and features the various forms these memorials take as well as the different ways in which they express mourning and remembrance.
Queen's Birthday 2018	17 April 2018	Jason Watts	The 2018 Queen's Birthday stamp issue celebrates the 92nd birthday of Her Majesty Queen Elizabeth II.
Norfolk Island Wrasses	30 April 2018	Roger Swainston	The reef at Emily Bay, Norfolk Island is a popular spot for snorkelling, due to its clear water and an abundance of fish species. The most predominant family in terms of individual species are wrasses (Labridae). Wrasses are a large family of fish that inhabit coral reefs and other temperate waters. They are often brightly coloured. As each wrasse species has differing colour patterns across male, female and (sometimes) juvenile, from 17 wrasse species in the reef there are almost 50 spectacular colour variations.
Cloudscapes	1 May 2018	Lisa Christensen	Clouds are made of tiny water droplets or ice crystals, suspended in the atmosphere. It is commonly observed that dark, threatening clouds can herald a storm, or that fluffy white clouds serenely billow across the sky on a perfect summer's day. But the science of cloud classification is much more complex than this.
First Cricket Tour: 150 Years	1 May 2018	Phil Ellett	The First Cricket Tour: 150 Years stamp issue commemorates the first international cricket tour by a team from Australia, which occurred 150 years ago in 1868. The 1868 tour of England was undertaken by a team of 13 Aboriginal cricketers, most of whom were Jardwadjali, Gunditjmara and Wotjobaluk men from the Western District of Victoria. Many team members had also played in the historic 1866 Boxing Day match between an Aboriginal XI and the Melbourne Cricket Club, held at the Melbourne Cricket Ground. The enthusiastic reception to this match inspired the idea of a tour of England, backed by private financiers.
Silo art	21 May 2018	Janet Boschen	Since 2015 some spectacular large-scale artworks have revitalised small, drought-stricken rural communities across Australia. While street art's domain is typically the laneways and brick buildings of the city, it is the towering grain silos of Australia's wheat-growing regions that have brought street art to the country. Painted by renowned street artists, these incredible painted silos have become landmarks in their own right, attracting increasing numbers of visitors and putting their tiny towns on the national and international map.
Finches of Australia II	5 June 2018	Kevin Stead	In March 2018, we released a stamp issue featuring four Australian finch species: the Blue-faced Parrot-Finch, Double-barred Finch, Star Finch and Zebra Finch. Another three of Australia's 19 finch species take flight in this companion issue, specifically the Gouldian Finch, Black-throated Finch and Beautiful Firetail.
Art in Nature	12 June 2018	Andrew Hogg	Aerial photography is a particularly effective mode for enabling the natural landscape to unfold in abstracted form. Such photography not only reveals singular landforms in quite unexpected ways but it also accentuates patterning, symmetry and colours that invoke in us deeply felt connections with planet Earth.
Cocos (Keeling) Islands Basket Weaving	26 June 2018	Sonia Young	On Home Island, in the Cocos (Keeling) Islands, the local Cocos Malay population still engages in traditional basket weaving, known as keroso. Round, rectangular, boat-shaped and cylindrical baskets are created using palm leaves. The baskets were traditionally used for storage and transportation of flowers, fruit and bait, and for drying fish and coconut shells. Today, they are often used around the home as a form of storage for household items. Public weaving sessions are also conducted as part of cultural tours of the island.
The Birth of HRH Prince Louis of Cambridge	3 July 2018	Samir Hussein	At one minute past 11 (BST) on the morning of 23 April 2018, The Duke and Duchess of Cambridge welcomed their third child into the world. Weighing 8 lb 7oz, the new prince was born at the Lindo Wing of St Mary's Hospital, in London, where his two siblings were also born. Following the announcement of the birth, a framed notice was placed on an ornate easel on the forecourt of Buckingham Palace, as is tradition. Flags were also raised at Buckingham Palace and Windsor Castle to mark the birth of the new prince.
Frogs	10 July 2018	Owen Bell	There are around 6,000 species of frog worldwide and Australia is home to around 200 of them, many of which are endemic. This relative scarcity of frog species is thought to be due to our dry environment, although some Australian frog species have been remarkable in their ability to adapt to our harsh climate.
Norfolk Island Crystal Pool	17 July 2018	Sharon Rodziewicz	Norfolk Island's volcanic origins are evidenced by its rock pools, which were formed from lava beds and eroded lava tunnels. One such rock pool is Crystal Pool, which is located at Point Ross on the south-western end of the island.
Reef Safari - Stamp Collecting Month 2018	1 August 2018	Sonia Young	This year's Stamp Collecting Month features one of the world's most remarkable natural wonders, Australia's Great Barrier Reef. Situated off the eastern coast of Australia in the Coral Sea, the Great Barrier Reef is the largest coral reef system in the world, comprising more than 2,900 individual reefs and 900 islands. It stretches for over 2,300 kilometres, from the northern tip of Queensland and south to Fraser Island. The largest living structure on the planet, the Great Barrier Reef is even visible from space.
Winx	18 August 2018	Unknown	This stamp issue marks the record-breaking 26th consecutive race win by Australian mare Winx, run on 18 August 2018. The race, previously known as the Warwick Stakes, in 2017 was renamed the Winx Stakes in honour of the champion mare. This is a new Australian record, breaking the 25 wins by Black Caviar, and is second worldwide only to the Hungarian mare Kincsem, which won all of her 54 races in the 1870s.
Children's Bush Classics	21 August 2018	Mary Callahan	Two iconic Australian children's novels are celebrating their centenary in 2018: The Magic Pudding, by Norman Lindsay (1879–1969), and the first of the Snugglepot and Cuddlepie series, Tales of Snugglepot and Cuddlepie: Their Adventures Wonderful, by May Gibbs (1877–1969). The Australian bush infuses the colourful characters and lively illustrations of these much-loved stories, neither of which has been out of print.
Christmas Island: The Art of John Gerrard Keulemans	28 August 2018	John White	Dutch-born John Gerrard Keulemans (1842–1912) was a popular bird illustrator in the 19th and early 20th centuries. Based in London for most of his career, he contributed to a very large number of important ornithological publications.

== See also ==
- Australian Legends
- Postage stamps and postal history of Australia
