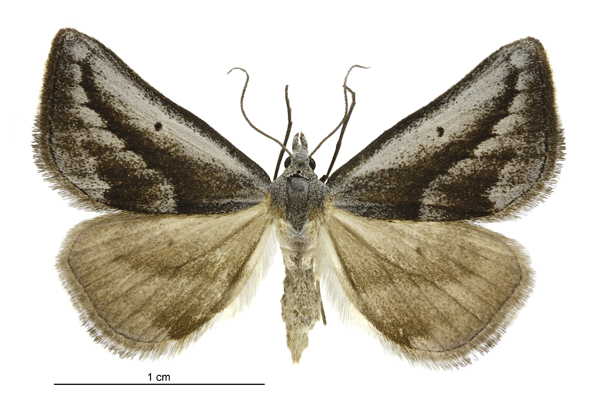
- Female specimen
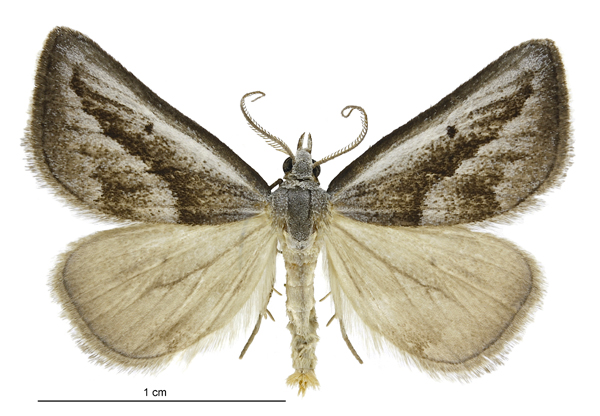
- Male specimen

Scientific classification
- Kingdom: Animalia
- Phylum: Arthropoda
- Clade: Pancrustacea
- Class: Insecta
- Order: Lepidoptera
- Family: Geometridae
- Genus: Adeixis
- Species: A. griseata

Binomial name
- Adeixis griseata (Hudson, 1903)

Synonyms
- Dichromodes griseata Hudson, 1903

= Adeixis griseata =

Species of moth endemic to New Zealand

Adeixis griseata (also known as the swamp looper) is a species of moth of the family Geometridae. It is endemic to New Zealand and has been collected in the North, South and Chatham Islands. This species inhabits poorly drained or swampy areas. As at 2017 the host plant of this species is unknown however it has been hypothesised that the host plant may be Schoenus brevifolius or another common sedge. Adults have been observed on the wing from October until January.

== Taxonomy ==
This species was first described by George Vernon Hudson in 1903 from a specimen collected by Alfred Philpott at Seaward Moss in Southland and named Dichromodes griseata. There was some debate between taxonomists as to whether this species was distinct from the Australian species Adeixis inostentata. However, in 1920, after comparing specimens of both species, Philpott concluded it was distinct enough to be regarded as its own species. Louis B. Prout placed this species within the genus Adeixis in 1910. The syntype specimens are not held in Te Papa but J. S. Dugdale hypothesised that one of the syntypes may be held at the Natural History Museum, London under the species name Paragyrtis inostentata (now known as Adeixis inostentata). In 2019 the molecular phylogeny of this species was studied.

== Description ==
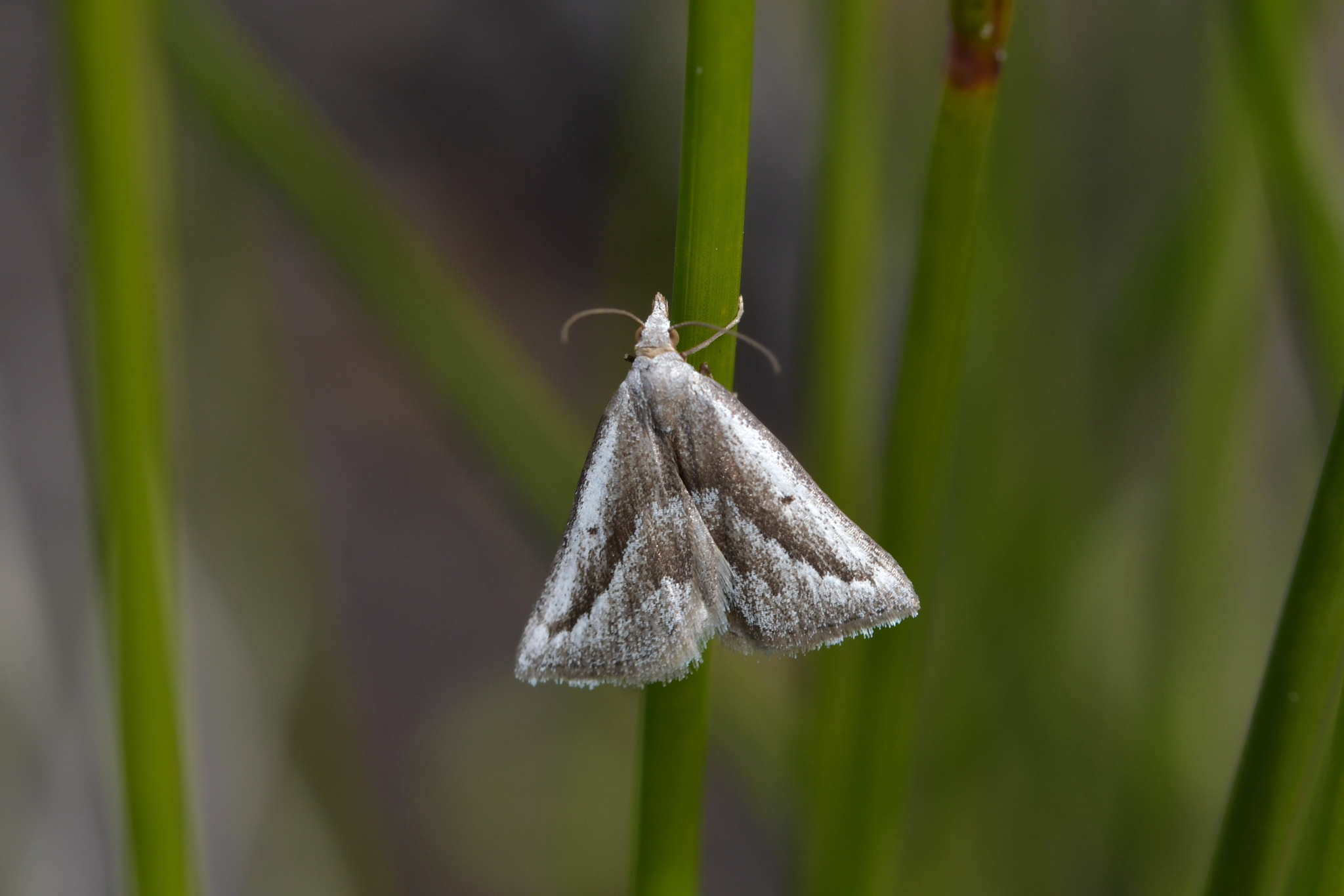
A. griseata

The forewings of A. griseata are silver grey in colour with a small disk-shaped dot as well as with dark brown or blackish triangular shaped shading from the middle of the base of the forewing to its apex and a much smaller brown triangular shaped shading below this. The hind-wings are grey coloured tinged with yellow brown. When at rest its body position tends to be head downward. Hudson regarded this species as being extremely variable in the intensity of its markings and the depth of its colouring.

== Range ==
Specimens have been collected not only at the type locality of Seaward Downs but also in other locations in the South Island such as Lake Manapouri, as well as localities in the North Island such as in Whangārei, Waimarino, Raetihi, Ohakuni and Kaitoki. A. griseata has also been found on the Chatham Islands.

== Behaviour ==
The adults of this species have been observed on the wing from October to January.

== Habitat ==
Adeixis griseata tends to inhabit poorly drained or swampy areas with sedges, rushes, Gleichenia, and native shrubs such as Pittosporum and Coprosma. However, as at 2017 the host plants of A. griseata is unknown. It has been hypothesised that the host plant may be Schoenus brevifolius or another common sedge.
