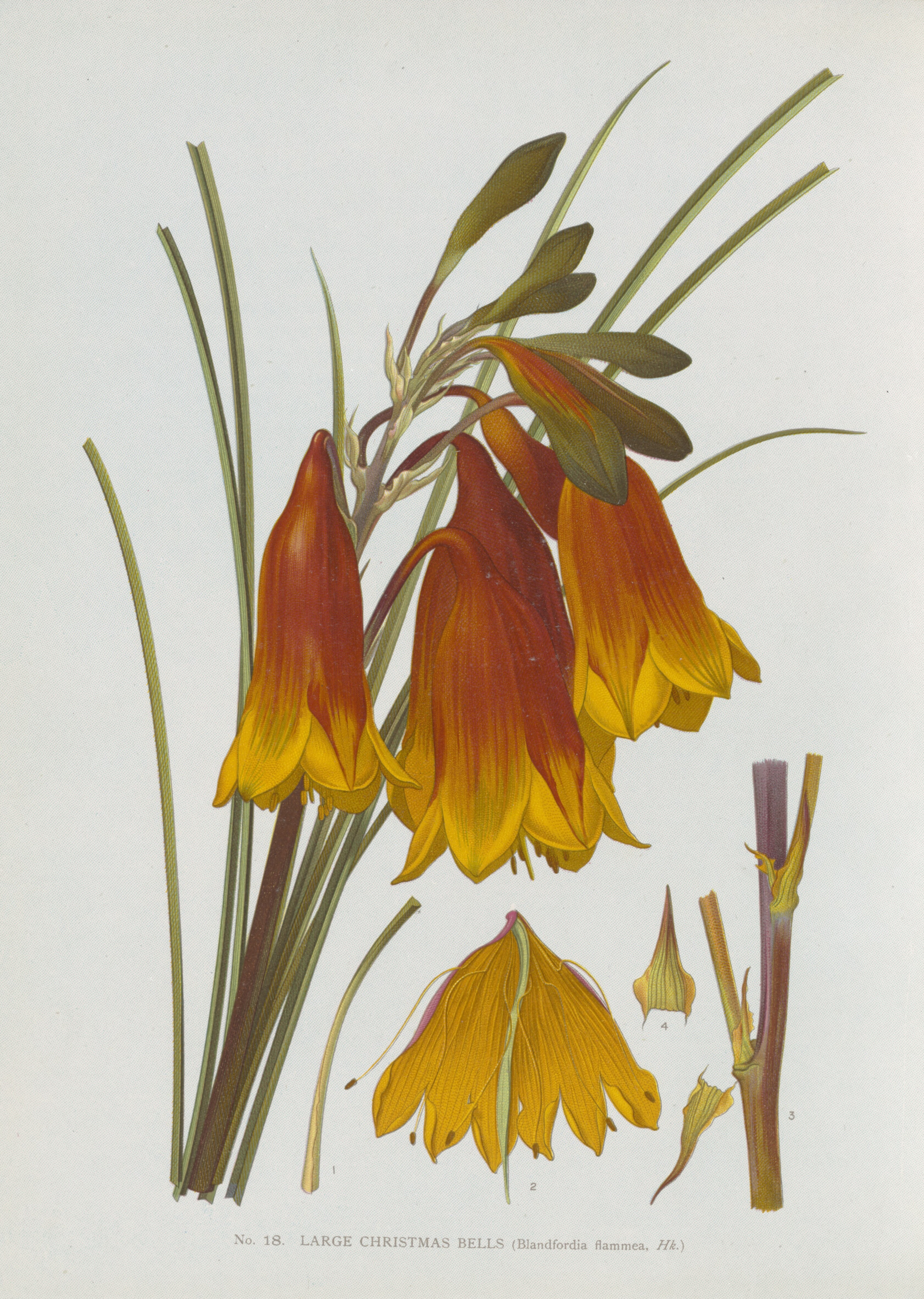
- Illustration of Blandfordia grandiflora by Edward Minchen

Scientific classification
- Kingdom: Plantae
- Clade: Tracheophytes
- Clade: Angiosperms
- Clade: Monocots
- Order: Asparagales
- Family: Blandfordiaceae; R.Dahlgren & Clifford
- Genus: Blandfordia; Sm.
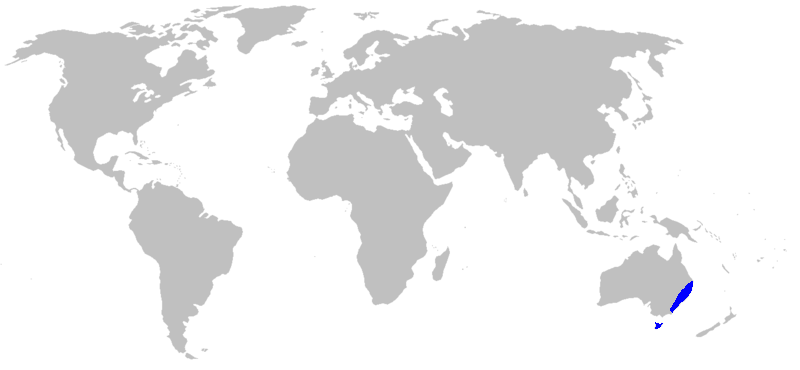
- Distribution

= Blandfordia =

Christmas bells

Genus of flowering plants

Blandfordia, commonly known as Christmas bells, is a genus of four species of flowering plants native to eastern Australia. Christmas bells are tufted, perennial herbs with narrow, linear leaves and up to twenty large, drooping, cylindrical or bell-shaped flowers.

== Description ==
Plants in the genus Blandfordia are tufted, perennial herbaceous monocots with fleshy, fibrous or tuber-like roots from a corm. The leaves are narrow and linear, usually crowded in two ranks from the base of the flowering stem. Up to twenty flowers are arranged near the top of the flowering stem that has small, leaf-like bracts. The flowers are usually red with yellow lobes. The sepals and petals are fused to form a tube-shaped, cylindrical or bell-shaped flower with six lobes about one-fifth the length of the tube. There are six stamens fused to the inside wall of the flower tube and the style is linear. Flowering occurs in spring or summer and is followed by the fruit which is a capsule, tapered at both ends and containing a large number of hairy brown seeds.

== Taxonomy and naming ==
The genus Blandfordia was first formally described in 1804 by James Edward Smith from dried specimens sent from Sydney by the colonial surgeon, John White. Smith published the description in Exotic Botany. The name Blandfordia honours George Spencer-Churchill, 5th Duke of Marlborough, the Marquis of Blandford. The type species is Blandfordia nobilis as it was the first described by Smith.

Blandfordia is placed in the family Blandfordiaceae of the order Asparagales of the monocots. It is the sole genus in the family Blandfordiaceae. Such a family has only recently been recognized by taxonomists. The APG IV system of 2016 (unchanged from the 1998, 2003 and 2009 versions) recognizes this family. Previously various families were suggested.

Four species are accepted by the Australian Plant Census:

- Blandfordia cunninghamii Lindl. (New South Wales)
- Blandfordia grandiflora R.Br. (Queensland, New South Wales)
- Blandfordia nobilis Sm. (New South Wales)
- Blandfordia punicea (Labill.) Sweet (Tasmania)

== Distribution and habitat ==
Two of the four species of Blandfordia are restricted to New South Wales, a third also occurs in Queensland, and the fourth only occurs in Tasmania. Christmas bells usually grow in heathlands, especially waterlogged sites and mostly in coastal or near-coastal areas although some populations occur on the tablelands.

== Use in horticulture ==
The large, distinctive flowers and long vase life of Blandfordia suggest good commercial potential for the cut flower trade and a small group of producers cater to the domestic and export markets. It is a protected species and in the past over-collecting has caused localised extinction and damage to the habitat of the species.
