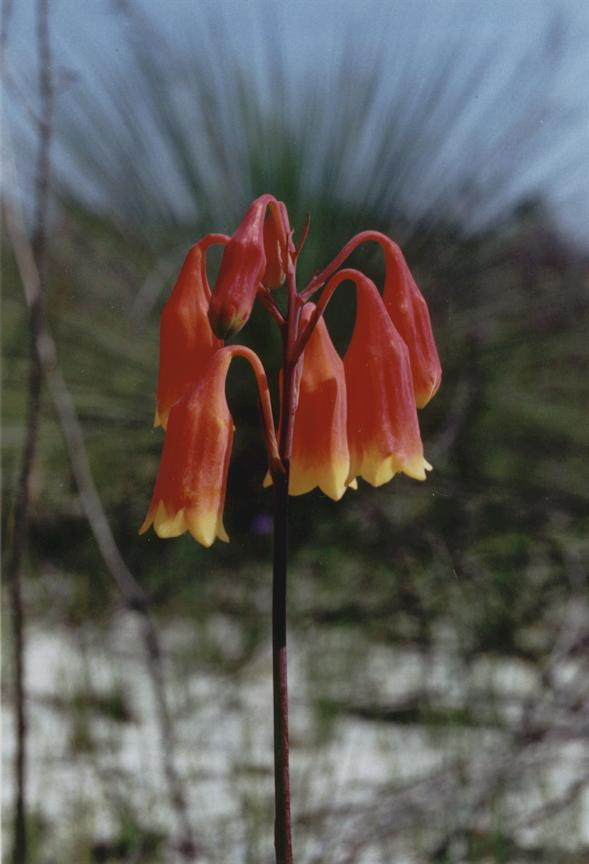
- In Brisbane Water National Park

Conservation status
- Endangered (NCA)

Scientific classification
- Kingdom: Plantae
- Clade: Tracheophytes
- Clade: Angiosperms
- Clade: Monocots
- Order: Asparagales
- Family: Blandfordiaceae
- Genus: Blandfordia
- Species: B. grandiflora

Binomial name
- Blandfordia grandiflora R.Br.

Synonyms
- List: Blandfordia aurea Hook.f.; Blandfordia cunninghamii var. splendens W.Bull nom. inval., pro syn.; Blandfordia flammea Lindl. ex Paxton; Blandfordia flammea Lindl. isonym; Blandfordia flammea var. aurea F.M.Bailey; Blandfordia flammea var. aurea (Hook.f.) Har. nom. illeg.; Blandfordia flammea var. aurea (Hook.f.) F.M.Bailey nom. illeg.; Blandfordia flammea Lindl. ex Paxton var. flammea; Blandfordia flammea var. princeps (W.G.Sm.) Baker; Blandfordia grandiflora R.Br. var. grandiflora; Blandfordia princeps W.G.Sm.

= Blandfordia grandiflora =

Christmas bells

Species of flowering plant

Blandfordia grandiflora, commonly known as Christmas bells, is a flowering plant endemic to eastern Australia. It is a tufted perennial herb with narrow, channelled, linear leaves and between two and twenty large, drooping, bell-shaped flowers. The flowers are red with yellow tips, or sometimes entirely yellow. It is one of four species of Blandfordia known as Christmas bells, this one growing on the coast and nearby ranges between Sydney in New South Wales and Fraser Island in Queensland.

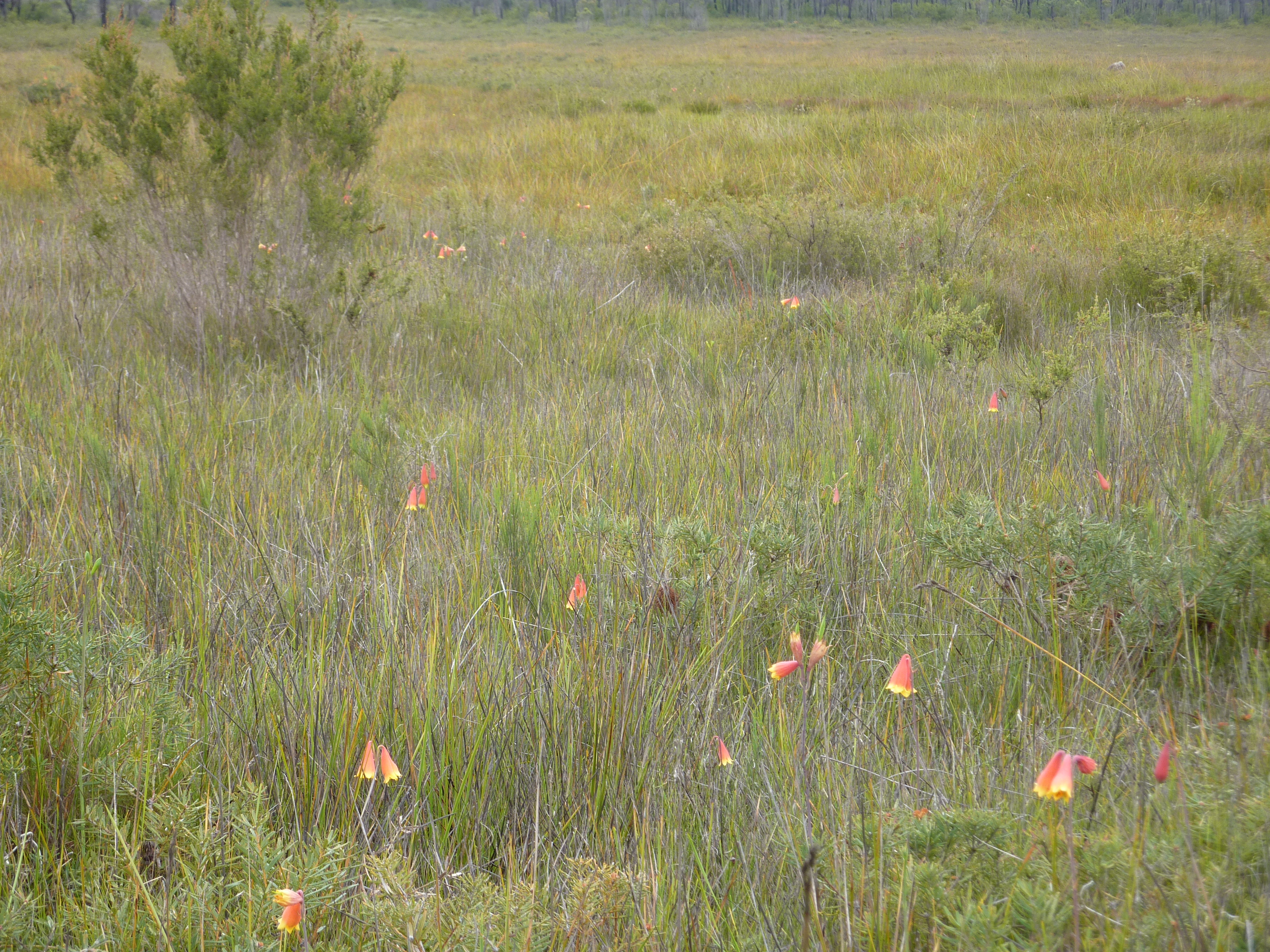
Habitat in the Gibraltar Range National Park

== Description ==
Blandfordia grandiflora is a tufted perennial plant with flat, linear, channelled leaves usually up to 80 cm (31 in) long and 7 mm (0.28 in) wide. The flowering stem is unbranched, up to 80 cm (31 in) long and about 7 mm (0.28 in) wide but sometimes up to 175 cm (69 in) long. There are between two and twenty flowers, each on a pedicel stalk up to 45 mm (1.8 in) long with a small bract near its base. The three sepals and three petals are fused to form a bell-shaped flower usually 35–60 mm (1.4–2.4 in) long and about 18–30 mm (0.71–1.2 in) wide at the tip. The base of the flower is narrow, then expands gradually towards the tip where there are six pointed lobes about 11 mm (0.43 in) long. The flower is usually red with yellow lobes, but sometimes entirely yellow. The stamens are attached to the inside wall of the flower tube, just below its middle. Flowering occurs from late spring to early summer, and is followed by the fruit which is a capsule about 60 mm (2.4 in) long on a stalk up to 60 mm (2.4 in) long.

== Taxonomy and naming ==
Blandfordia grandiflora was first described in 1810 by Robert Brown, who collected specimens near the Hunter River. The description was published in Prodromus Florae Novae Hollandiae et Insulae Van Diemen. The name Blandfordia honors the Marquis of Blandford, and the specific epithet grandiflora is derived from the Latin word grandis meaning "great" and the suffix -flora meaning "flowered".

== Distribution and habitat ==
This species of Christmas bells grows in damp soils on the coast and tablelands between the Hawkesbury River in New South Wales, Fraser Island in Queensland and inland as far as Glen Innes.

== Use in horticulture ==
Although Blandfordia grandiflora is endemic to Australia, in the nineteenth century many botanists grew it in Great Britain because it can easily be grown as a potted plant. B. grandiflora grows well in sandy soils. The wet coastal heaths of Australia, such as those found in New South Wales and Queensland, have the sandy soil necessary for it to grow. The soil should be light and well-drained, and the plant should not be in direct sunlight or in heavy shade. Although it is the most robust of the four species, B. grandiflora is very slow growing, so more aggressive plants easily swamp it in the wild.

== Culture ==
The species was illustrated on Australian stamps issued in 1960 and Christmas 1967.

Botanical illustrations: Sydenham Edwards 1825 (left), Walter Hood Fitch 1854 (centre), Edward Minchen 1896 (right)
