= Adeixis =

Scientific classification
- Kingdom: Animalia
- Phylum: Arthropoda
- Clade: Pancrustacea
- Class: Insecta
- Order: Lepidoptera
- Family: Geometridae
- Subfamily: Oenochrominae
- Genus: Adeixis; Warren, 1897

Synonyms
- Paragyrtis Meyrick, 1905

Genus of geometer moths

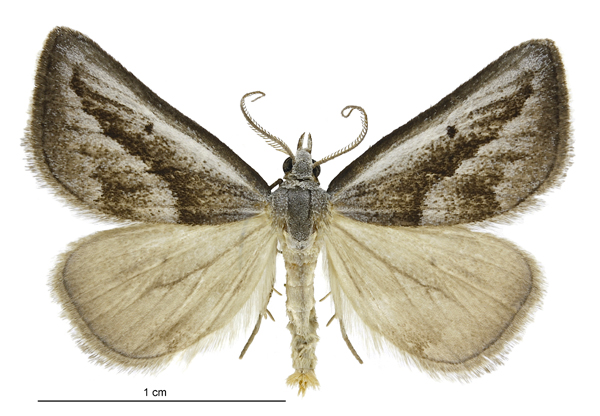
Male specimen of Adeixis griseata

Adeixis is a genus of moths in the family Geometridae described by Warren in 1897.

== Species ==
- Adeixis baeckeae Holloway, 1979 New Caledonia
- Adeixis griseata Hudson, 1903 New Zealand
- Adeixis inostentata Walker, 1861 Australia
- Adeixis major Holloway, 1979 New Caledonia
- Adeixis montana Holloway, 1979 New Caledonia
