= Edward Minchen =

Australian botanical artist

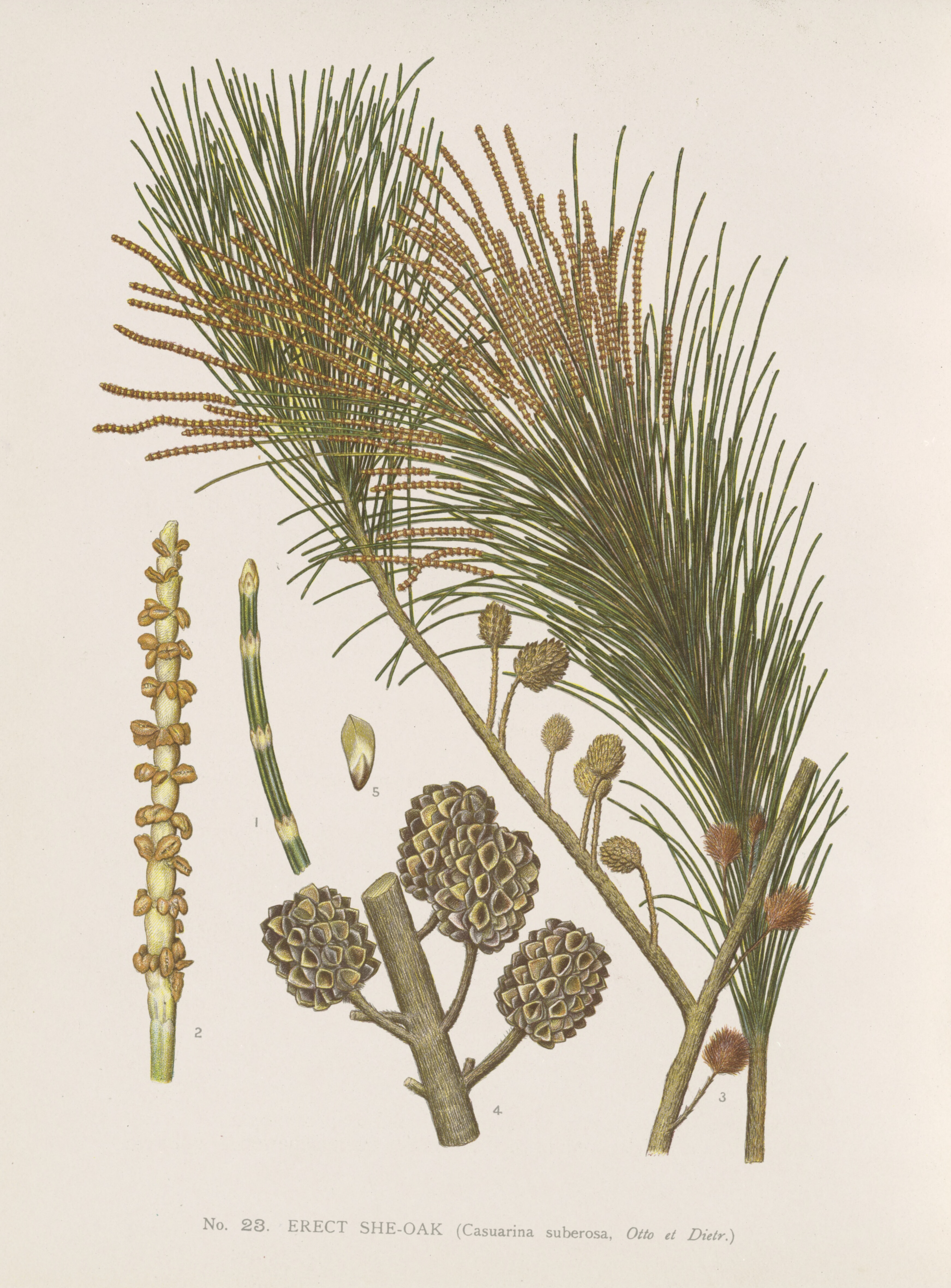
Allocasuarina littoralis

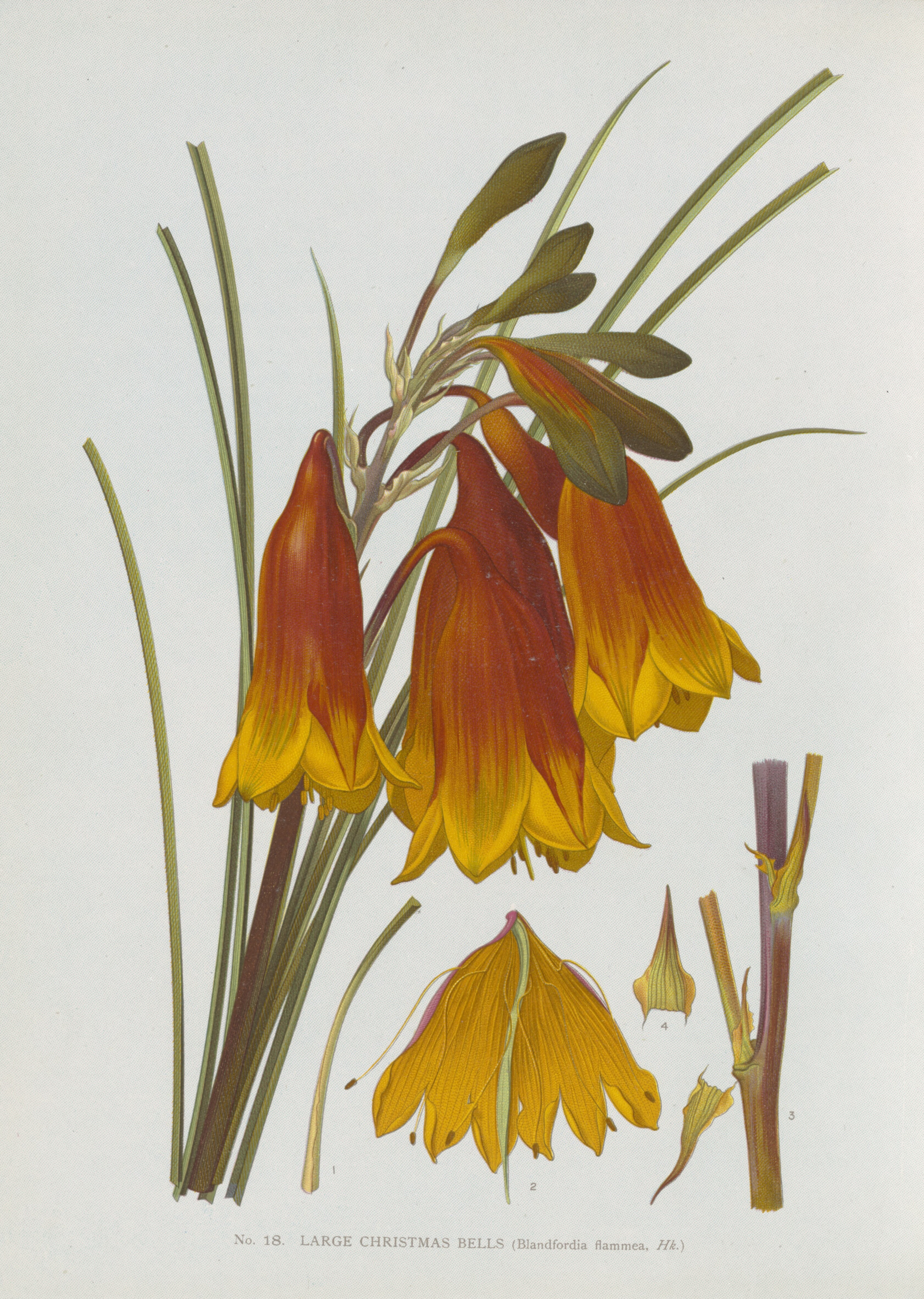
Blandfordia grandiflora

Edward William Minchen/Minchin (25 June 1852 – 1913) was an Australian botanical artist.

Minchen was born in Middle Swan, Perth, Western Australia, the son of James Minchen and Elizabeth Fisher, and had a fairly checkered career pursuing jobs at sea, trades, an attempt at the stage and the National Art Gallery. He ended up working as a lithographer in New South Wales for the Lands Department, the Survey Office and the Government Printer. He often collaborated with Henry Baron (1863-?), a lithographic artist who joined the Government Printer in 1891.

== Family ==
Elizabeth Fisher (*1834), daughter of William Fisher (1803-1878) and Elizabeth Witt Wittle (1808-), at 17, married James Minchin (24 June 1821, Petersfield, Hampshire - 26 May 1901, Mooroopna, Victoria), son of James Minchin (1799-1837) and Elizabeth Tewlett, on 24 August 1851 at Middle Swan. James, a carpenter, was the brother of Hester/Esther Minchin (20 August 1828 Petersfield, Hampshire - 11 September 1900 South Australia), who had married Elizabeth's brother, Samuel Fisher. James and Elizabeth produced three sons: Edward William Minchin born in 1852; James Henry (1854-1855); James Walter born 1856.

Elizabeth Fisher had arrived at the Swan River Colony from London with her parents on board the Success on 22 March 1843. James had arrived at Fremantle from Portsmouth with his parents on board the Caroline on 12 October 1829. James and his family went to Victoria some time in the 1850s, where James worked as a carpenter and wheelwright.

== Publications ==
- The Flowering Plants and Ferns of New South Wales

== See also ==
- List of Australian botanical illustrators
- Minchen, Edward William (1852 - 1913)
