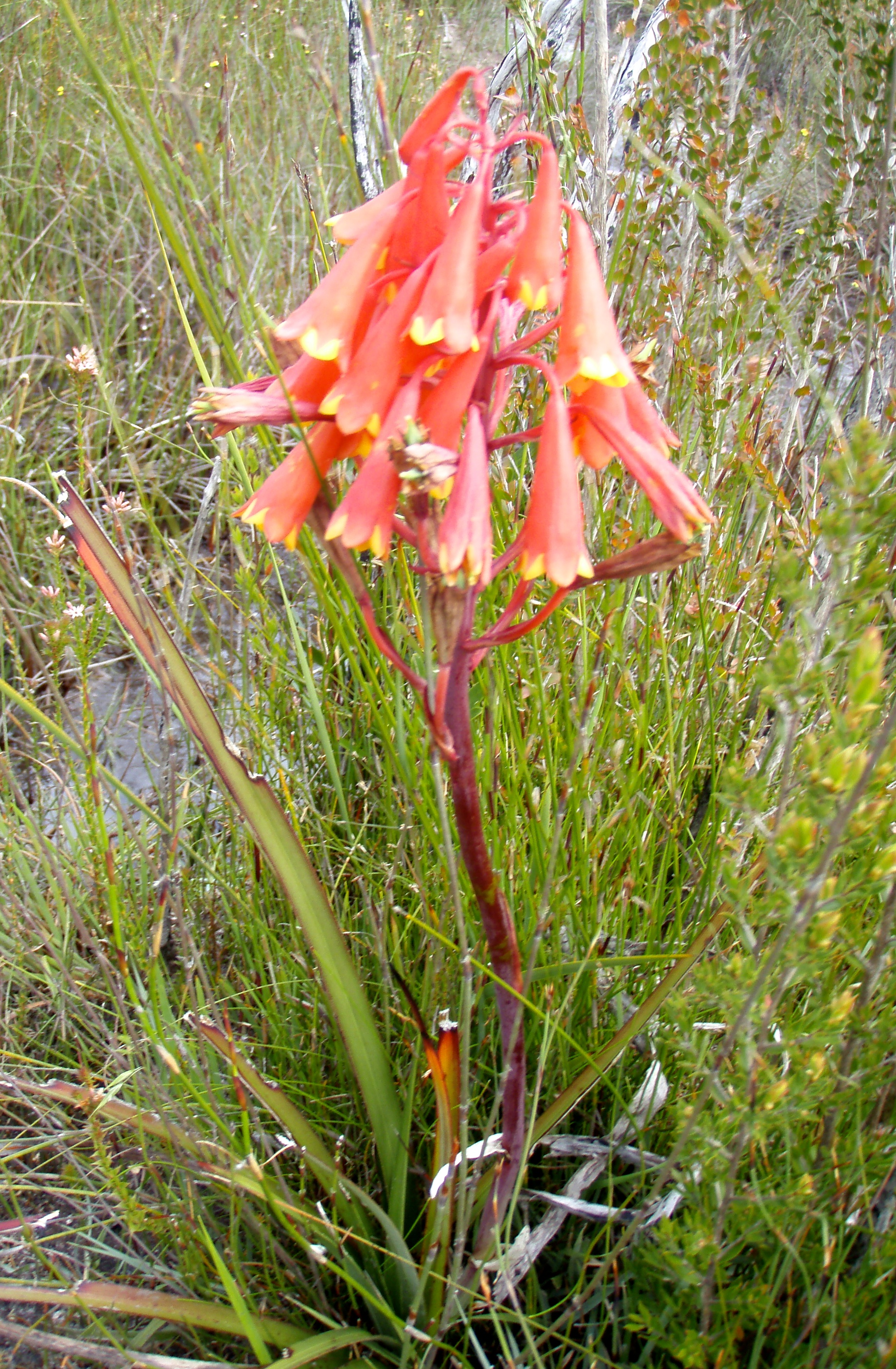
- Flowers in the Southwest National Park

Scientific classification
- Kingdom: Plantae
- Clade: Embryophytes
- Clade: Tracheophytes
- Clade: Spermatophytes
- Clade: Angiosperms
- Clade: Monocots
- Order: Asparagales
- Family: Blandfordiaceae
- Genus: Blandfordia
- Species: B. punicea

Binomial name
- Blandfordia punicea (Labill.) Sweet

Synonyms
- Aletris punicea Labill.; Blandfordia backhousei Lindl.; Blandfordia backhousii Lindl. orth. var.; Blandfordia grandiflora var. backhousei (Lindl.) Hook.f.; Blandfordia grandiflora var. backhousii Hook.f. orth. var.; Blandfordia grandiflora var. marginata (Herb.) Hook.f.; Blandfordia marginata Herb.

= Blandfordia punicea =

Tasmanian Christmas bell

Species of flowering plant

Blandfordia punicea, commonly known as Tasmanian Christmas bell, is a species of flowering plant that is endemic to western Tasmania. It is a tufted perennial herb with linear leaves and drooping red, bell-shaped flowers that are yellow on the inside.

== Description ==
Blandfordia punicea is a tufted perennial herb with flat, ribbed, strap-like leaves 30–100 cm (12–39 in) long, 6–8 mm (0.24–0.31 in) wide, with small teeth on the edge and often with a reddish tinge. The flowering stem is unbranched and bears up to twenty bell-shaped flowers up to 20–40 mm (0.79–1.6 in) long. The flowers are borne on a stout flowering stem up to 1.0 m (3.3 ft) long, each flower with a pedicel 25–50 mm (0.98–2.0 in) long. The stamens are attached above the middle of the flower tube. The flowers are mostly red on the outside with yellow on the inside and are usually very prominent in their native habitat, often rising above ground-level vegetation between mid-spring and early autumn. The fruit is a capsule 25–40 mm (0.98–1.6 in) long on a stalk about 25 mm (0.98 in) long.

== Taxonomy and naming ==
Tasmanian Christmas bell was first formally described in 1805 by Jacques Labillardière who gave it the name Aletris punicea and published the description in Novae Hollandiae Plantarum Specimen. In 1830, Robert Sweet changed the name to Blandfordia punicea. The specific epithet (punicea) is a Latin word meaning "reddish" or "purplish-red".

== Distribution and habitat ==
Blandfordia punicea grows in button grass (Gymnoschoenus sphaerocephalus) and damp heath, mostly west of a line between Bruny Island and Rocky Cape.

== Culture ==
An Australian 50c stamp depicting the species was issued on 13 February 2007.
