= Janet Matthews =

Janet Matthews Dip and Grad Dip Vis Arts, WASF, AGRAF
- Occupation: Artist
- Awards: Wildlife Artist of the Year (Australia): 2011, 2013, 2017; Focus on Nature Jury Award: 2014
- Website: www.janetmatthews.com.au

Janet Matthews is an Australian artist, known for her works in pencil and crayon, depicting Australia's wildlife. She has been the Wildlife Art Society of Australia's "Wildlife Artist of the Year" on three occasions, in 2011, 2013, and 2017.

In April 2014, she won a Focus on Nature Jury Award at the New York State Museum.

She created artwork for Australia Post, for their Australian Antarctic Territories series postage stamps (two×50c and two×$1.00), depicting fishes of the Australian Antarctic Territory, released on 1 August 2006, and of insects, for gutter decoration for 28 July 2009 "Micro Monsters" series.
