= Adeixis inostentata =

Scientific classification
- Kingdom: Animalia
- Phylum: Arthropoda
- Clade: Pancrustacea
- Class: Insecta
- Order: Lepidoptera
- Family: Geometridae
- Genus: Adeixis
- Species: A. inostentata

Binomial name
- Adeixis inostentata (Walker, 1861)

Synonyms
- Panagra inostentata Walker, 1861; Adeixis insignata Warren, 1897

Species of moth

Adeixis inostentata is a species of moth in the family Geometridae which was first described by Francis Walker in 1861. It is found in Australia.
