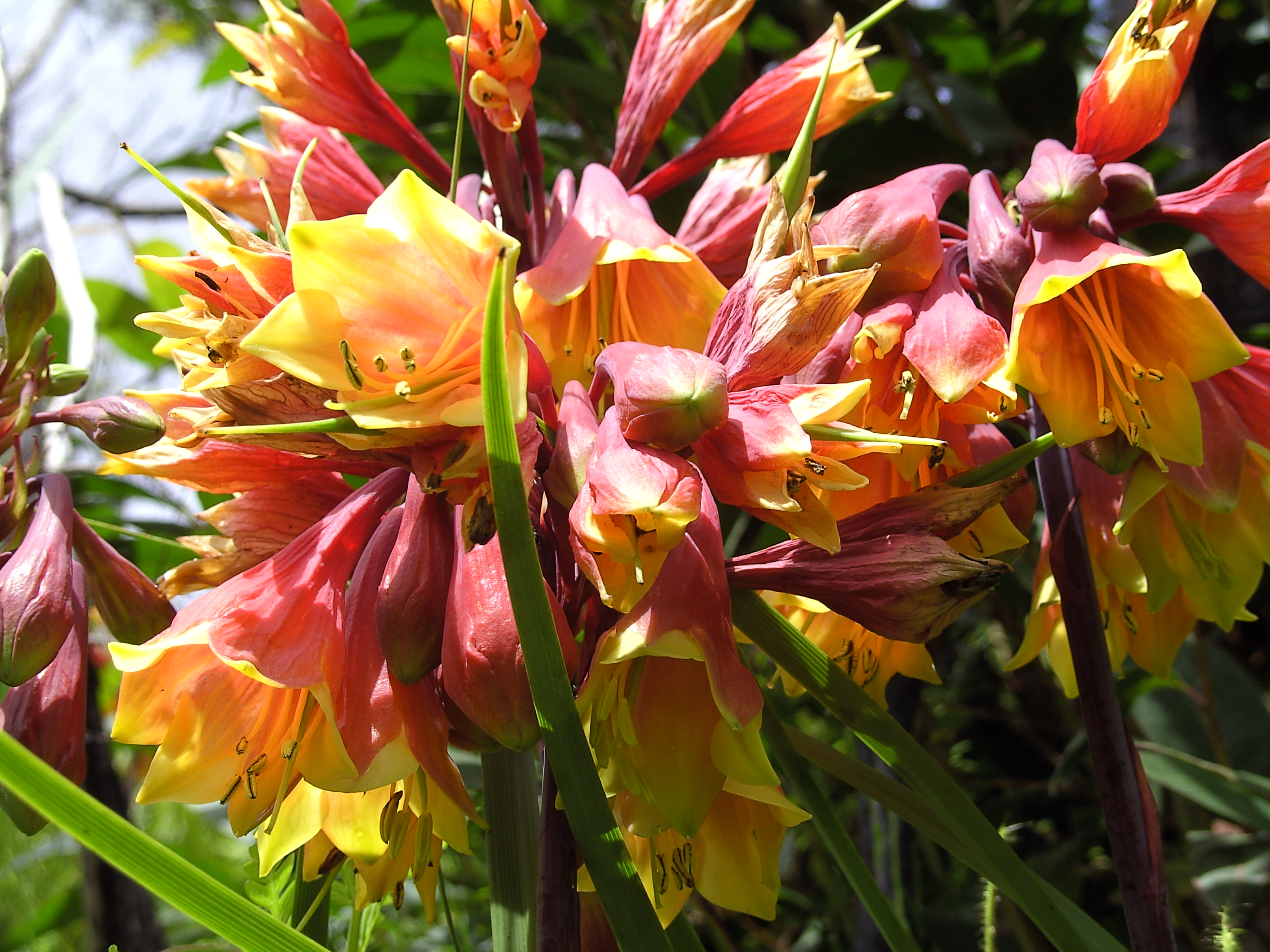
- Flowers near Blackheath

Scientific classification
- Kingdom: Plantae
- Clade: Tracheophytes
- Clade: Angiosperms
- Clade: Monocots
- Order: Asparagales
- Family: Blandfordiaceae
- Genus: Blandfordia
- Species: B. cunninghamii

Binomial name
- Blandfordia cunninghamii Lindl.

Synonyms
- Blandfordia cunninghami Van Houtte orth. var.; Blandfordia grandiflora var. elongata Benth.; Blandfordia grandiflora auct. non R.Br.: Bentham, G. (March 1878), Flora Australiensis 7: 23

= Blandfordia cunninghamii =

Christmas bells

Species of flowering plant

Blandfordia cunninghamii is one of four species of flowering plant commonly known as Christmas bells. It is a tufted, perennial herb endemic to the Blue Mountains and Illawarra regions of eastern Australia. It has long, narrow, linear leaves and between twelve and thirty large, drooping, cylindrical to bell-shaped red flowers with yellow tips.

== Description ==
Blandfordia cunninghamii is a tufted perennial herb with flat, grass-like leaves up to 100 cm (39 in) long and mostly 7–12 mm (0.28–0.47 in) wide, sometimes with small teeth. The flowering stem is unbranched, up to 80 cm (31 in) long and 10 mm (0.39 in) wide with between twelve and thirty flowers, each on a pedicel up to 45 mm (1.8 in) long with a bract about the same length near its base. The three sepals and three petals are fused to form a cylindrical flower usually 30–60 mm (1.2–2.4 in) long and 20–30 mm (0.79–1.2 in) wide at the end. The flower tube is narrower for about one-third of its length before suddenly expanding to a bell-shaped tip. The tip has six pointed lobes up to 12 mm (0.47 in) long. The flower is usually red with yellow lobes. The stamens are attached to the inside wall of the flower tube, just below its middle. Flowering occurs in summer and is followed by the fruit which is a capsule about 90 mm (3.5 in) long on a stalk up to 40 mm (1.6 in) long.

== Taxonomy and naming ==
Blandfordia cunningamii was first formally described in 1845 by John Lindley who published the description in Edwards's Botanical Register.

== Distribution and habitat ==
This species of Christmas bells grows in damp, shallow soil, often near cliffs. It is only found in the Blue Mountains and on Mount Kembla in the Illawarra region of New South Wales. Flowering appears to be indirectly stimulated by rainfall in September and by bushfire the previous summer.
