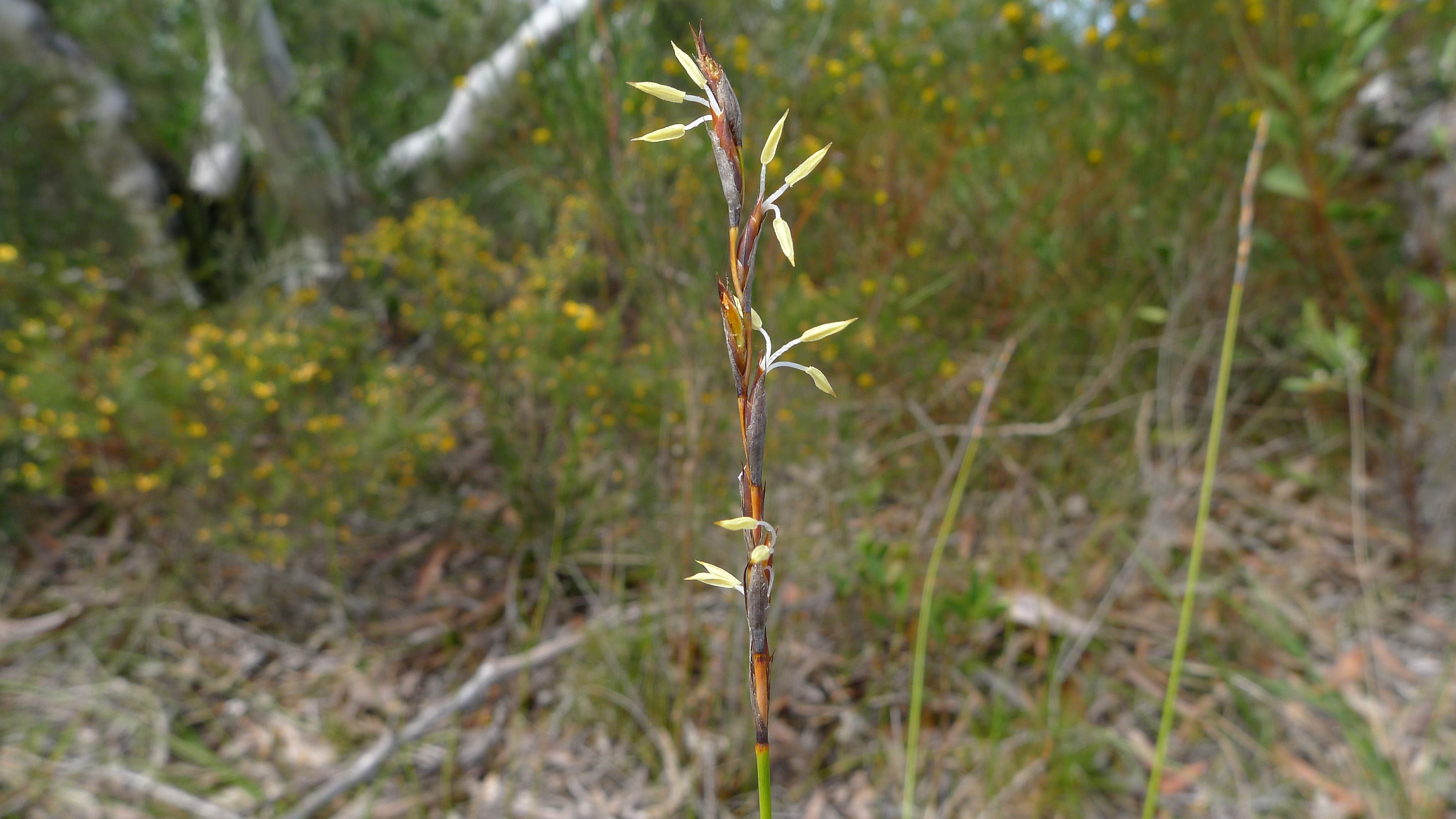
- S. brevifolius flowering in late August in New South Wales, Australia

Scientific classification
- Kingdom: Plantae
- Clade: Tracheophytes
- Clade: Angiosperms
- Clade: Monocots
- Clade: Commelinids
- Order: Poales
- Family: Cyperaceae
- Genus: Schoenus
- Species: S. brevifolius

Binomial name
- Schoenus brevifolius R.Br.

Synonyms
- Chaetospora tenax Hook.f.; Schoenus tenax (Hook.f.) Hook.f.; Schoenus hattorianus Nakai; Schoenus brevifolius subsp. tenax (Hook.f.) Kük.

= Schoenus brevifolius =

Zig-zag bog-rush

Species of grass-like plant

Schoenus brevifolius, known as zig-zag bog-rush, is a species of sedge native to Australia, New Zealand, New Caledonia, and the Ogasawara (Bonin) Islands. It was first described by Robert Brown in 1810.
