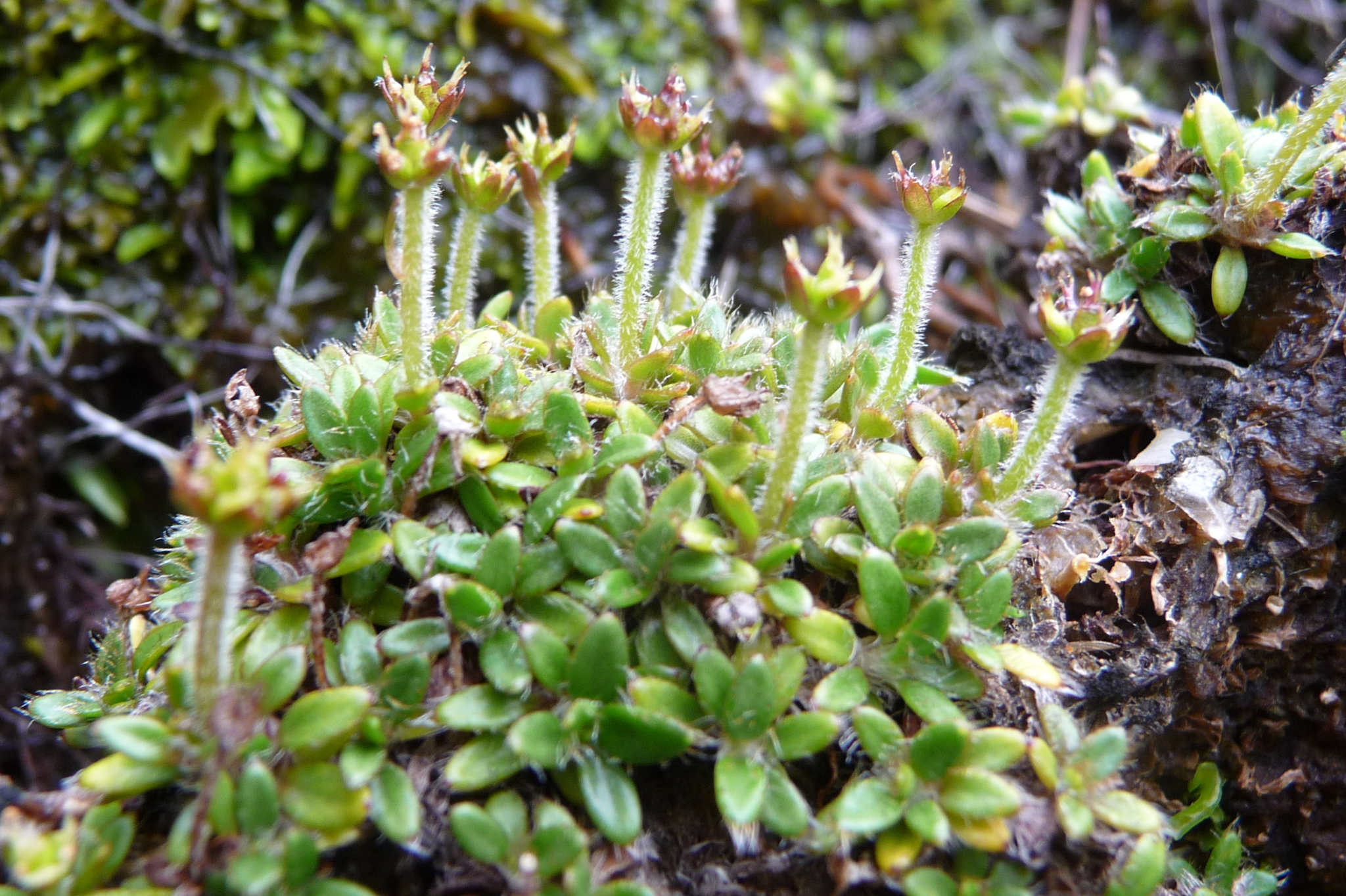

Scientific classification
- Kingdom: Plantae
- Clade: Tracheophytes
- Clade: Angiosperms
- Clade: Eudicots
- Clade: Asterids
- Order: Apiales
- Family: Apiaceae
- Genus: Actinotus
- Species: A. novae-zelandiae

Binomial name
- Actinotus novae-zelandiae (Petrie) Petrie
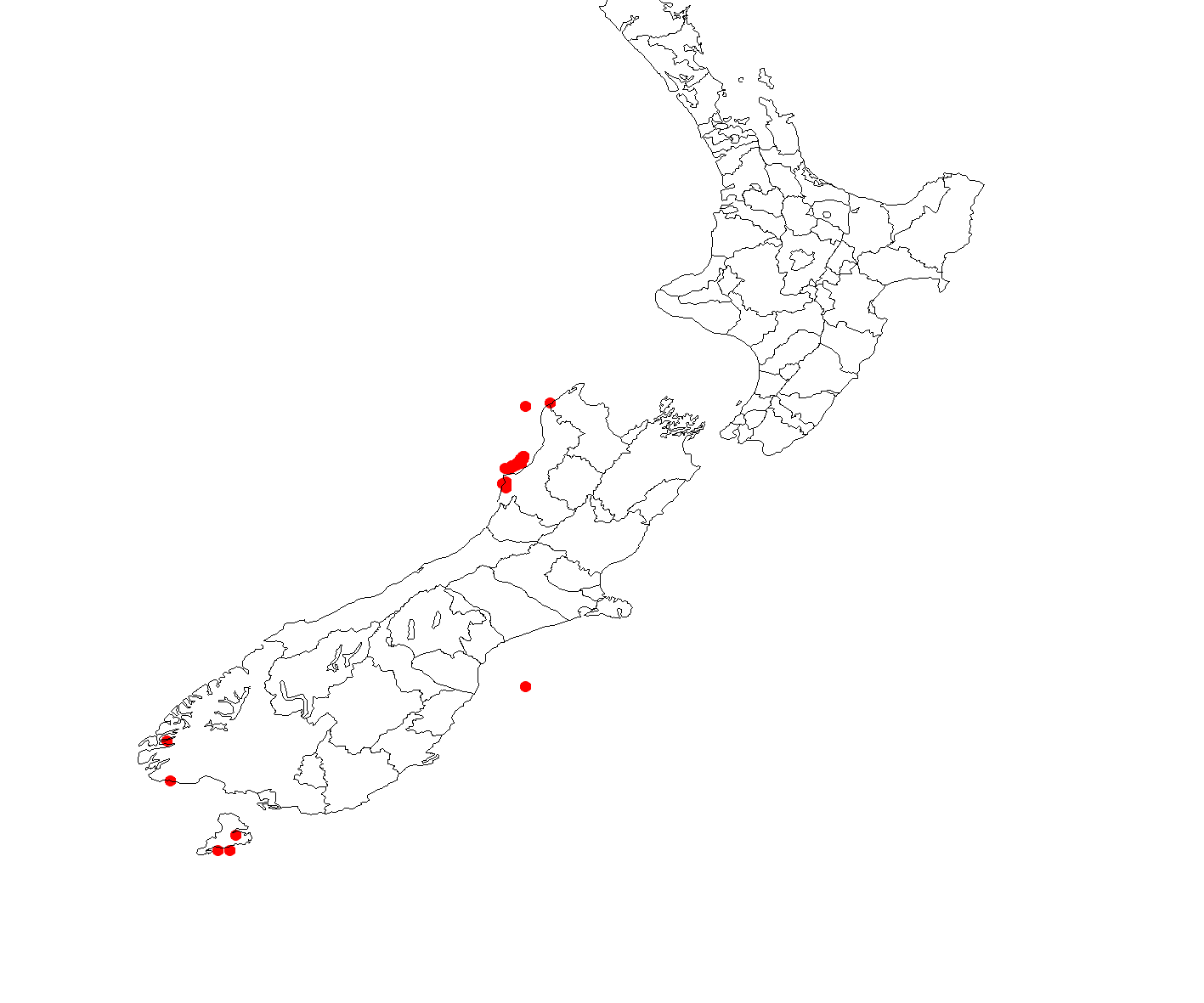
- Occurrence data from AVH

Synonyms
- Hemiphues novae-zelandiae Petrie

= Actinotus novae-zelandiae =

Species of flowering plant

Actinotus novae-zelandiae is a plant in the Apiaceae family, native to the South Island of New Zealand.

== Description ==
A. novae-zelandiae is a mat-forming/cushion-forming species and has fewer anthers (two anthers) than most Actinotus species. It is very like A. suffocatus but differs in that leaves are not clearly petiolate, the leaf apex is cartilaginous, and there are 5–6 bracts subtending the capitula which are broadly ovate-triangular whereas A. suffocatus has 8–13 bracts which are narrowly triangular to oblong.

== Habitat and distribution ==
It is found in the western and southern parts of the South Island and on Stewart Island, in both lowland and alpine areas, in wet or boggy spots.

== Taxonomy ==
It was first described in 1880 by Donald Petrie as Hemiphues novae-zelandiae, and then redescribed by him in 1881 as Actinotus novae-zelandiae.

== Conservation status ==
In both 2009 and 2012 it was deemed to be "Not Threatened" under the New Zealand Threat Classification System, and this New Zealand classification was reaffirmed in 2018, with the further comment that it is DP or "Data Poor".
