= Actinotus moorei =

Scientific classification
- Kingdom: Plantae
- Clade: Embryophytes
- Clade: Tracheophytes
- Clade: Spermatophytes
- Clade: Angiosperms
- Clade: Eudicots
- Clade: Asterids
- Order: Apiales
- Family: Apiaceae
- Genus: Actinotus
- Species: A. moorei

Binomial name
- Actinotus moorei F.Muell. ex Rodway

Species of flowering plant

Actinotus moorei, the splitleaf flannelflower, is an endemic Tasmanian perennial herb in the family Apiaceae. It is found in wet ground at high elevation in Tasmania's Central Plateau as well as western and south-western mountains.

== Taxonomy ==
Actinotus moorei was described by Tasmanian dentist and botanist Leonard Rodway in 1896, based on a name by Ferdinand von Mueller.

== Description ==
Actinotus moorei is a small tufted perennial herb that can reach 10 cm in height. It differs from other Actinotus species in Tasmania by its leaves, which have the lamina divided into three segments.
