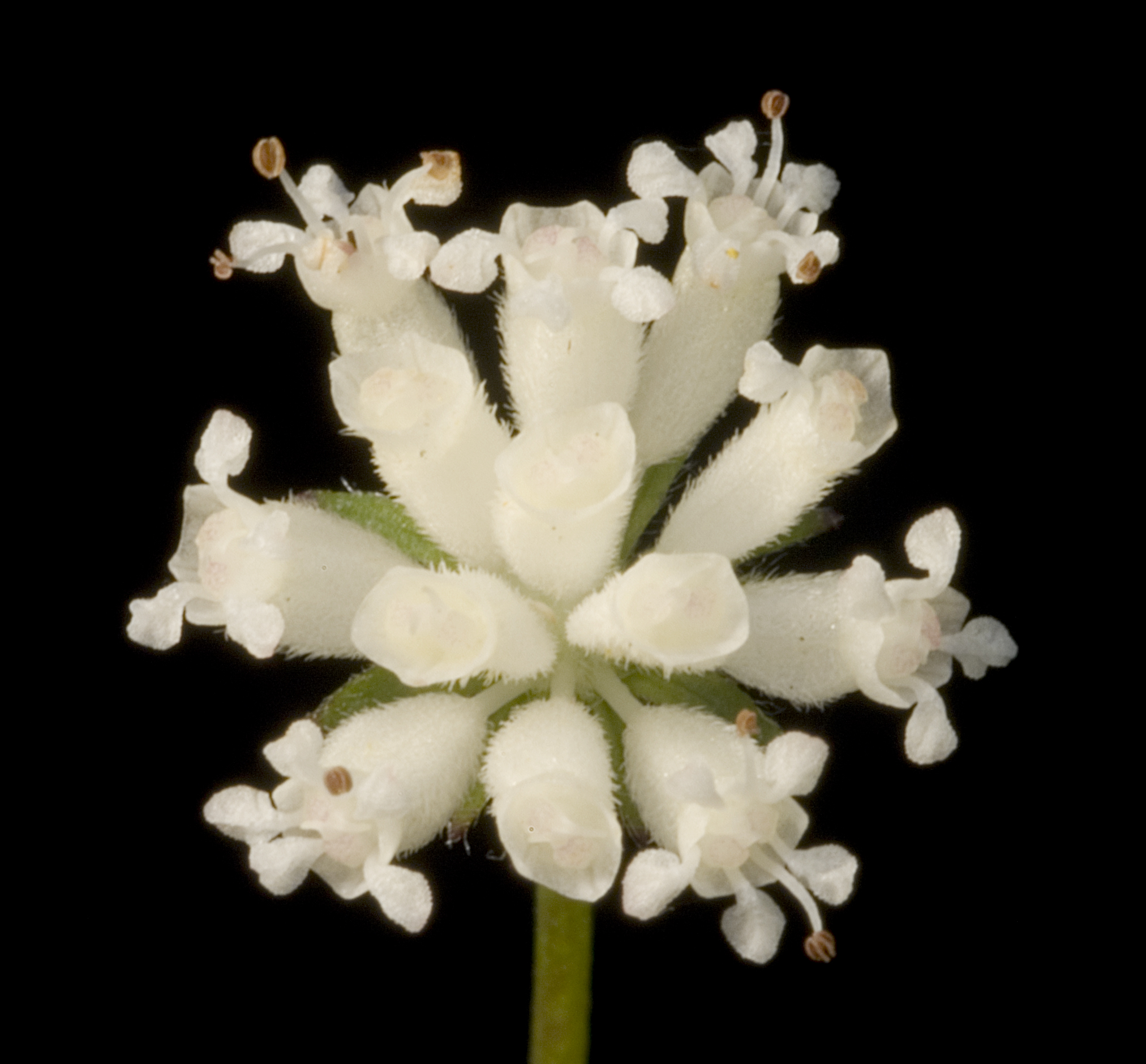
- A. laxus (photo K.R.Thiele)

Scientific classification
- Kingdom: Plantae
- Clade: Tracheophytes
- Clade: Angiosperms
- Clade: Eudicots
- Clade: Asterids
- Order: Apiales
- Family: Apiaceae
- Genus: Actinotus
- Species: A. laxus

Binomial name
- Actinotus laxus Keighery
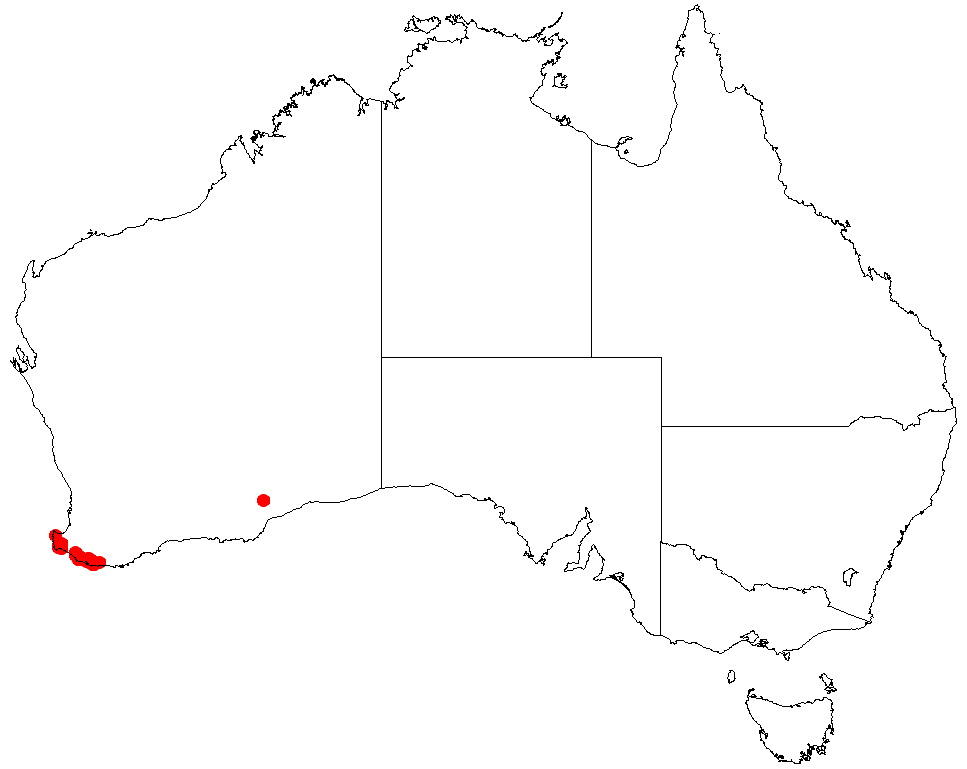
- Occurrence data from AVH

= Actinotus laxus =

Species of flowering plant

Actinotus laxus is a small plant in the Apiaceae family, endemic to the southwest coast of Western Australia.

It has no synonyms.

== Description ==
Actinotus laxus is a perennial herb growing to 0.4 m high and may either straggle or grow as a slender erect plant. The flowering branches are long and slender and the inflorescences are very small. Its white to cream flowers may be seen in December or from January to March.

== Habitat ==
It grows on sandy, peaty, or clayey soils and usually in fresh-water permanent swamps.

== Taxonomy ==
It was first described by Gregory John Keighery in 1999.
