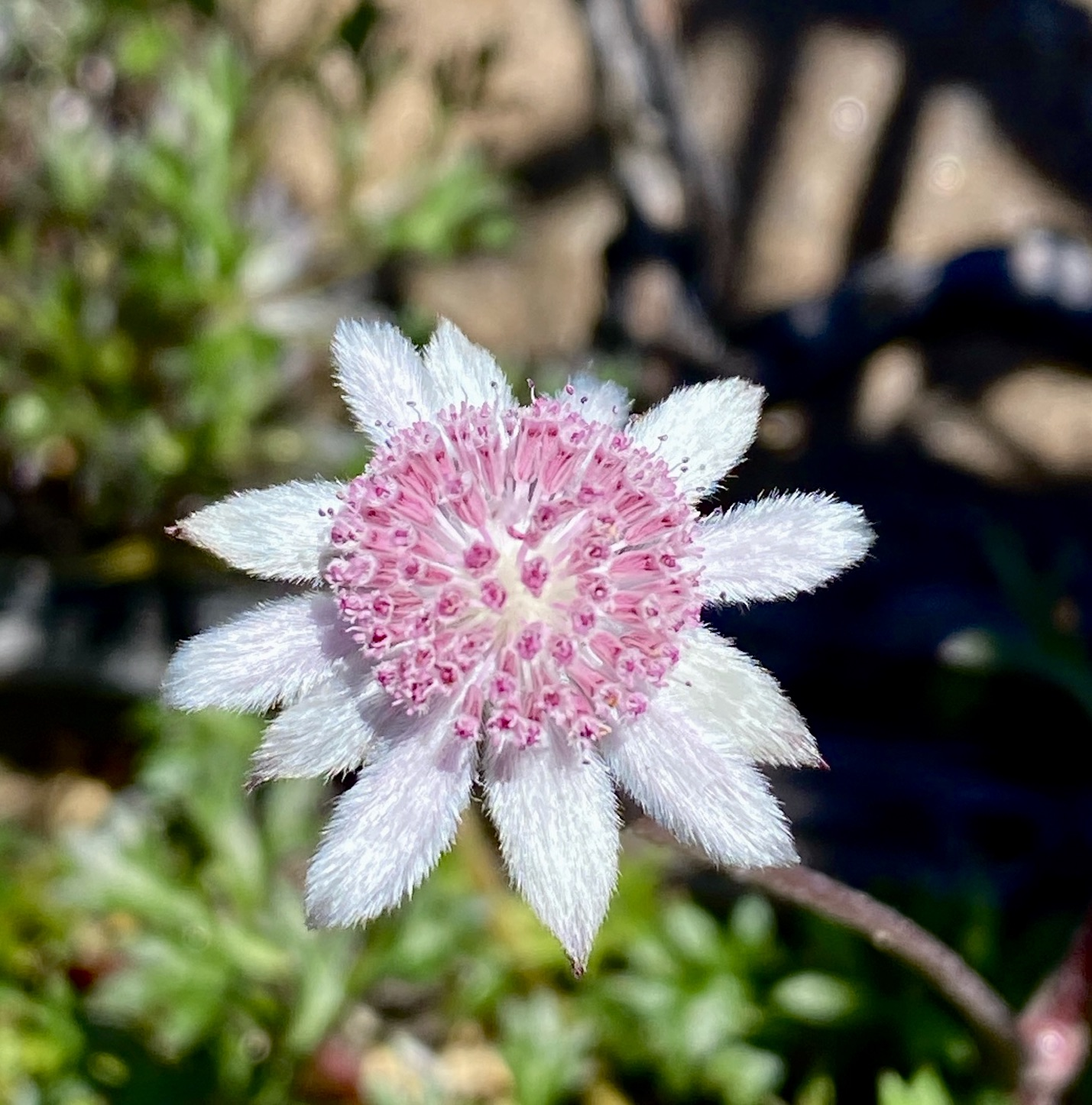

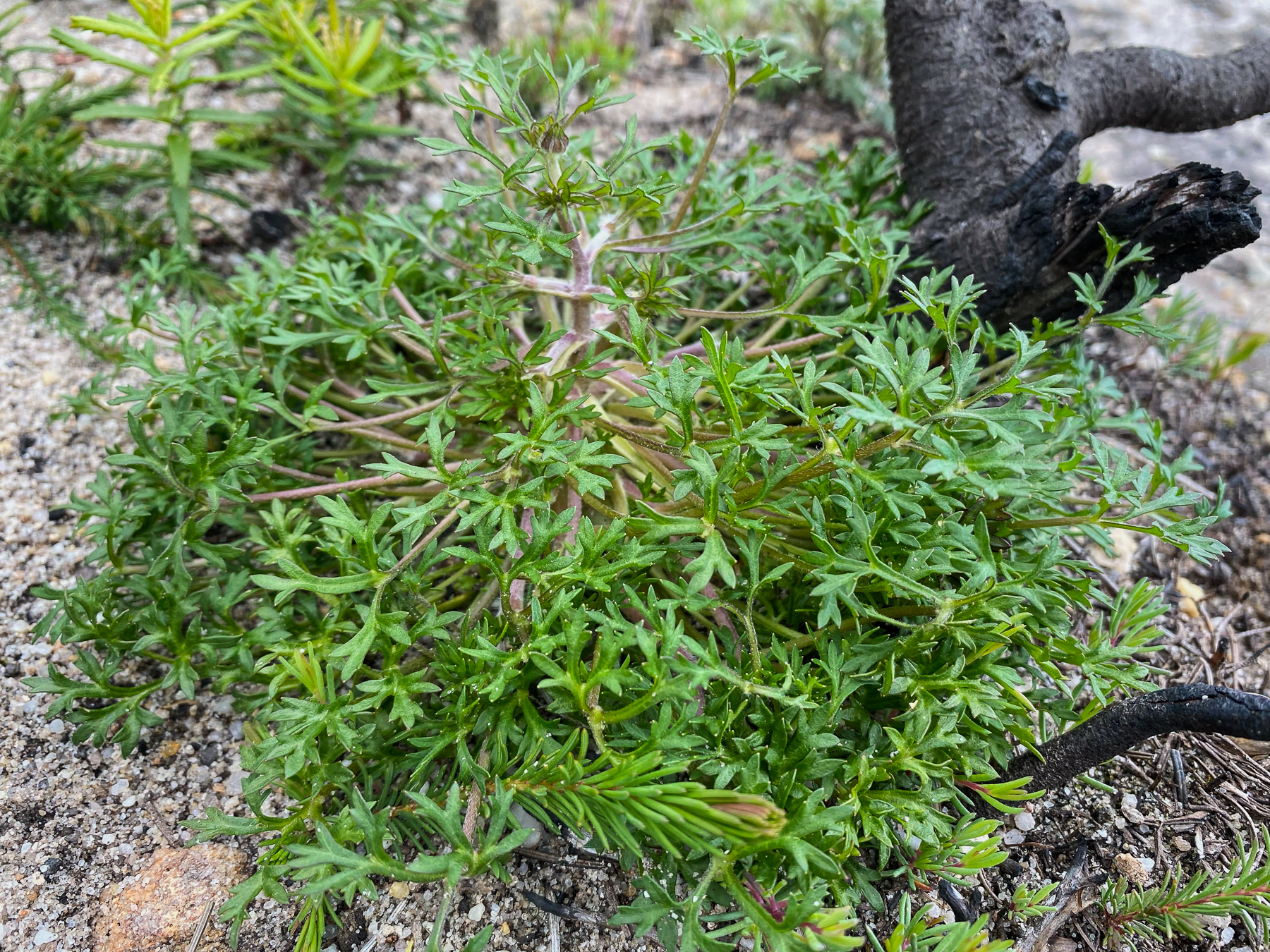

Scientific classification
- Kingdom: Plantae
- Clade: Tracheophytes
- Clade: Angiosperms
- Clade: Eudicots
- Clade: Asterids
- Order: Apiales
- Family: Apiaceae
- Genus: Actinotus
- Species: A. forsythii

Binomial name
- Actinotus forsythii Çelik
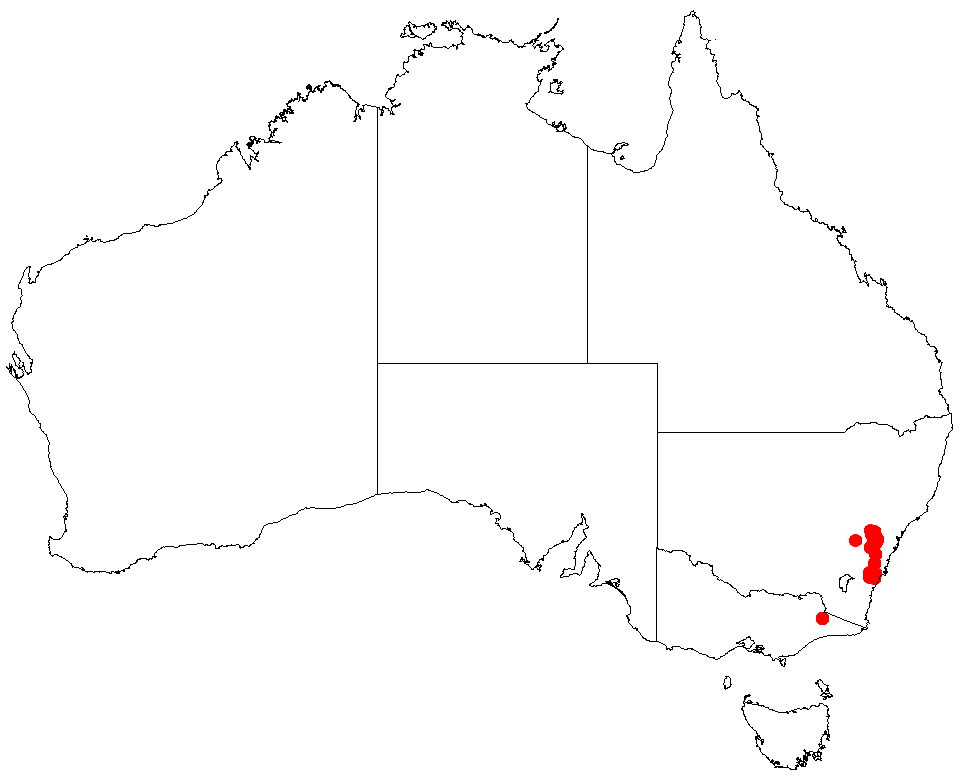
- Occurrence data from AVH

= Actinotus forsythii =

Species of flowering plant

Actinotus forsythii, the pink flannel flower or ridge flannel flower, is a plant in the family Apiaceae, native to the east coast of Australia, and found in New South Wales and Victoria

There are no synonyms.

== Description ==
Actinotus forsythii is a wiry herbaceous perennial with stems to 50 cm long, which trail along on the ground. The leaves are 3–7 partite, with the leaf blades from 6.4–18 mm long, by 10 mm wide, on petioles which are 4.5–20 mm long. The umbels are head-like, and from 7.5–20 mm in diameter including the bracts, with the male flowers circling up to 60 female flowers on peduncles which are 3.8–10.3 cm long. The bracts are elliptic and about 7 mm by 1.5–2 mm wide, white to pink and silky hairy above, green and hairless below. The male flowers have small and obtuse sepals and papery petals and are about 0.3 mm long. The female flowers have tiny sepals which form a skirt on the summit of the ovary and have no petals.

It flowers from January to May.

== Habitat ==
It is found in damp areas in eucalypt forests and heaths on shallow soils on sandstone.

== Gallery ==
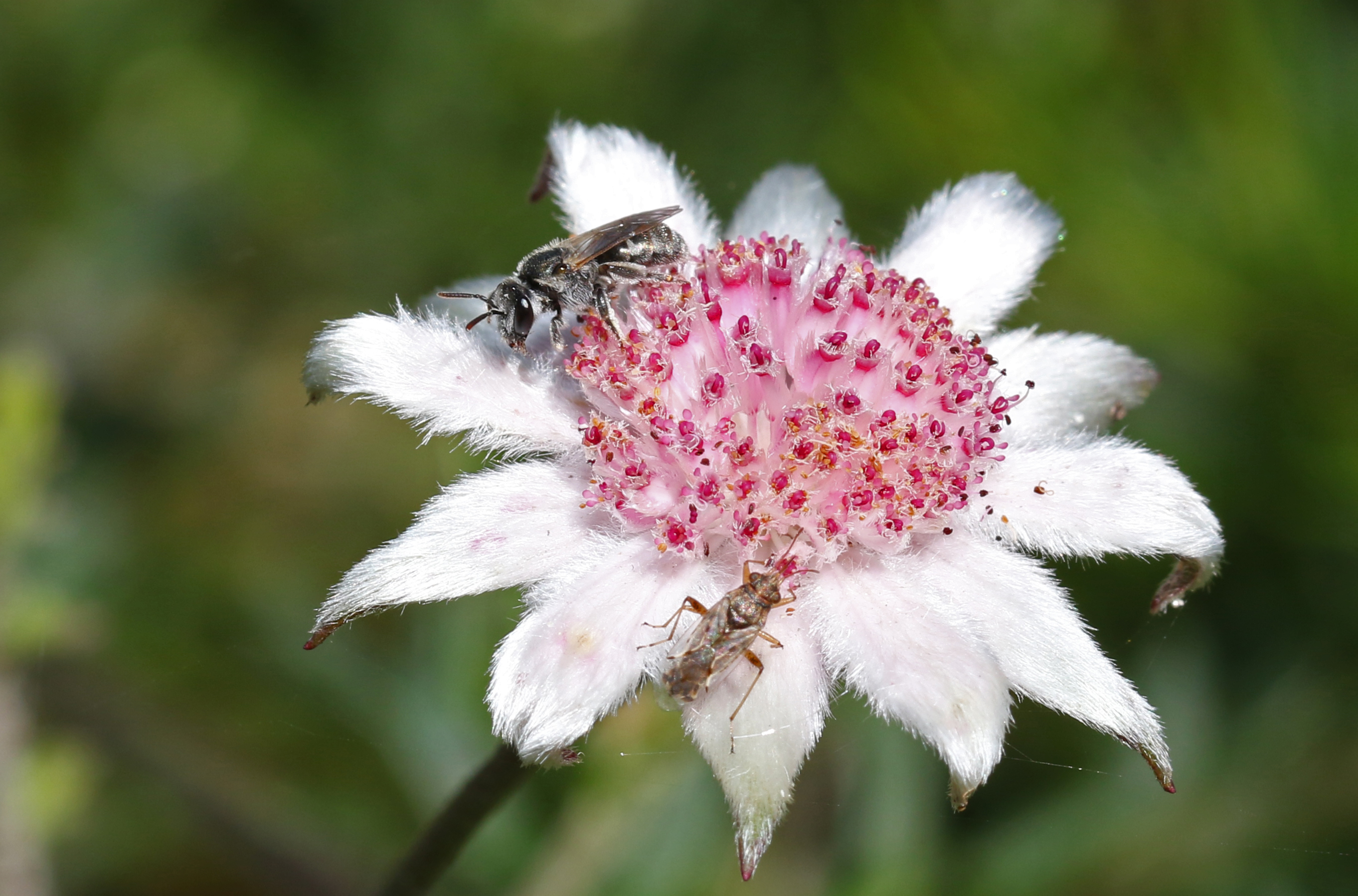
Flower and possible pollinators

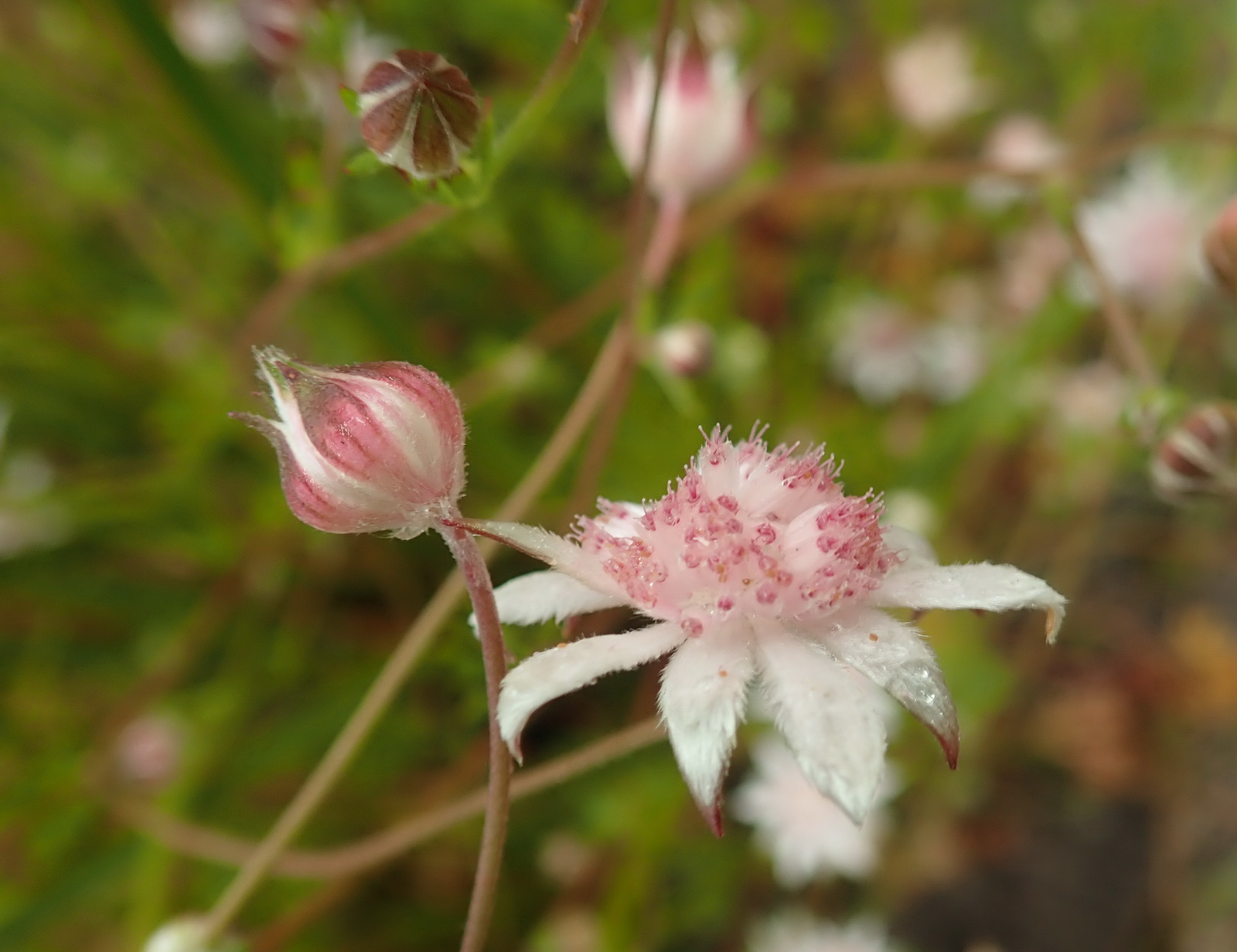
Flower and buds

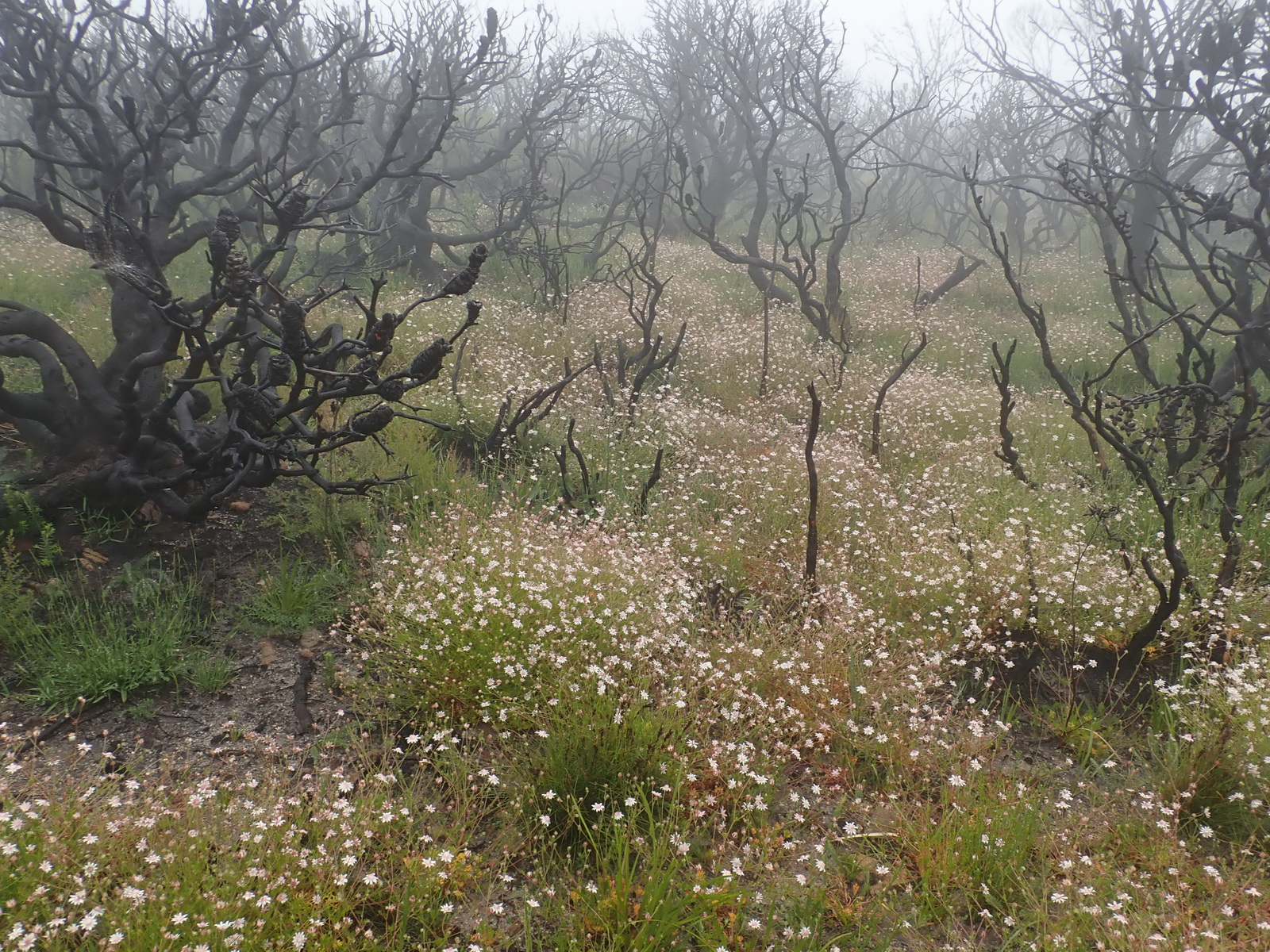
Habitat

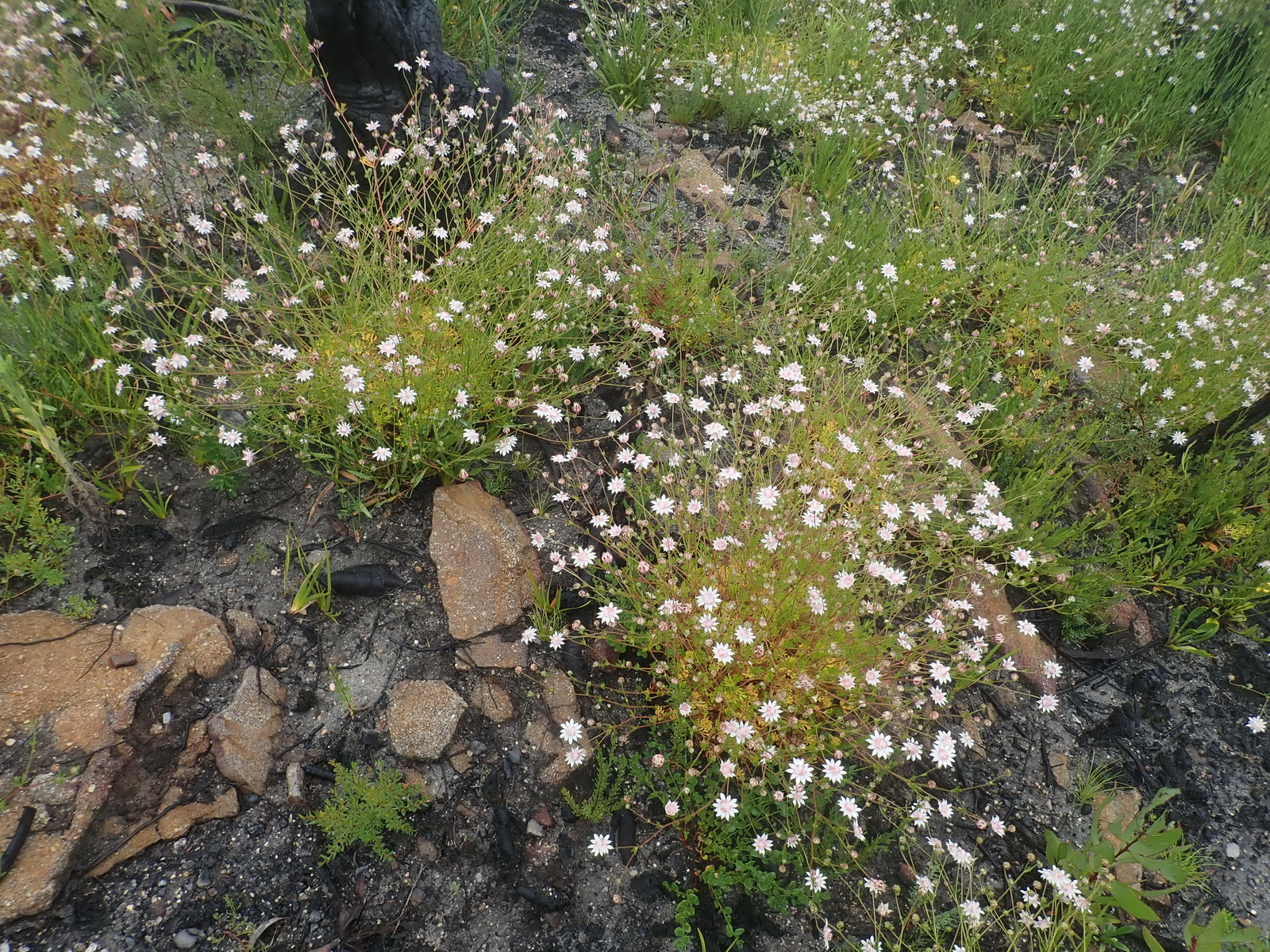
Habit
