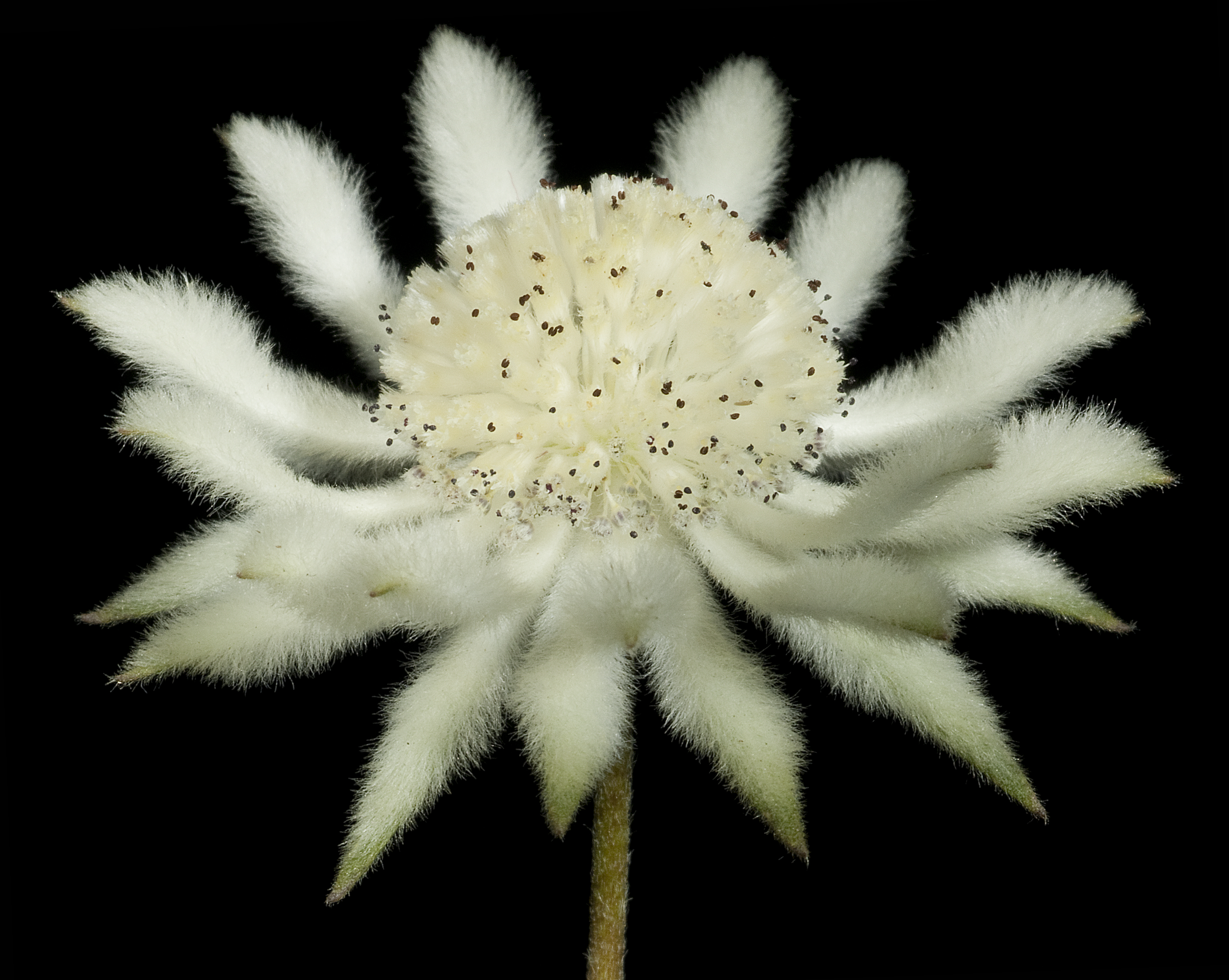
- A. leucocephalus (photo K.R.Thiele)

Scientific classification
- Kingdom: Plantae
- Clade: Tracheophytes
- Clade: Angiosperms
- Clade: Eudicots
- Clade: Asterids
- Order: Apiales
- Family: Apiaceae
- Genus: Actinotus
- Species: A. leucocephalus

Binomial name
- Actinotus leucocephalus Benth.
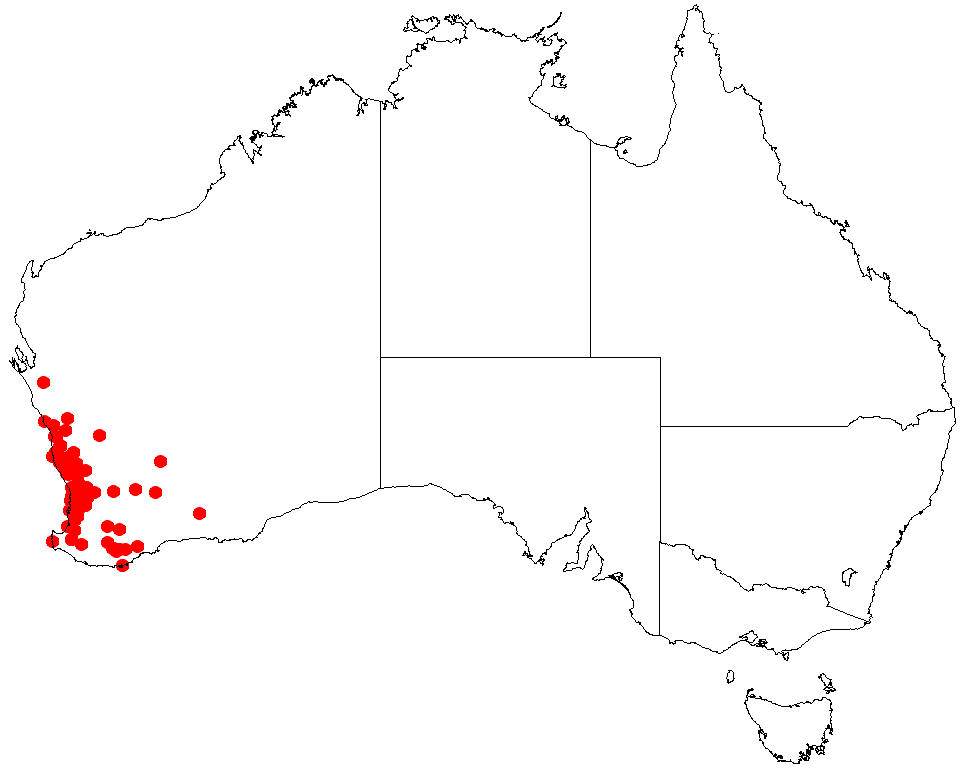
- Occurrence data from AVH

Synonyms
- Actinotus leucocephalus var. nanella O.H.Sarg. Eriocalia leucocephala (Benth.) Heynh. Holotome leucocephala (Benth.) Walp.

= Actinotus leucocephalus =

Species of flowering plant

Actinotus leucocephalus is a small plant in the Apiaceae family, endemic to Western Australia.

== Description ==
Actinotus leucocephalus is an erect annual herb growing from 0.1 to 0.45 m high. Its white to cream flowers may be seen from September to December or from January to February. It grows on many different soils.

== Taxonomy ==
It was first described by George Bentham in 1837.
