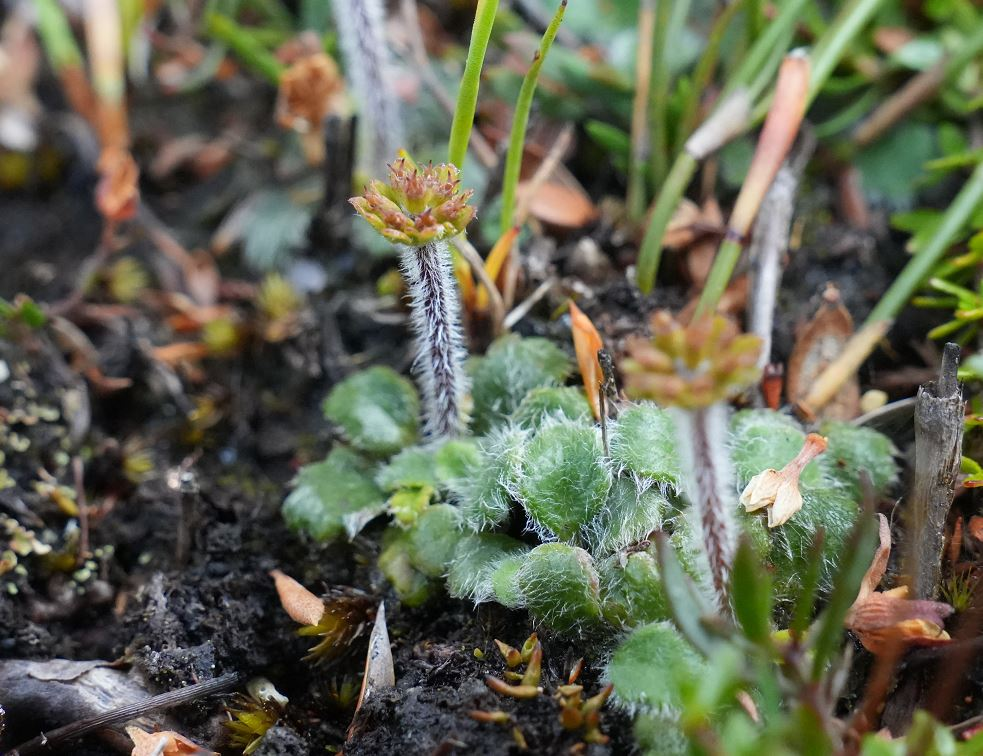
- Actinotus bellidioides in south west Tasmania

Scientific classification
- Kingdom: Plantae
- Clade: Tracheophytes
- Clade: Angiosperms
- Clade: Eudicots
- Clade: Asterids
- Order: Apiales
- Family: Apiaceae
- Genus: Actinotus
- Species: A. bellidioides

Binomial name
- Actinotus bellidioides Benth.

= Actinotus bellidioides =

Species of plant

Actinotus bellidioides, sometimes known as the tiny flannel-flower, is a rosette-forming herb endemic to Tasmania, Australia. Its name derives from the genus Bellis (family Asteraceae) combined with the Greek -oides (“resembling”), referencing the leaf similarity to Bellis. Although recorded in Western Australia in 1891 and Victoria in 1944, A. bellidioides is now presumed extinct on mainland Australia and persists only in Tasmania.

== Description ==
Actinotus bellidioides is a small perennial herb about 3 cm (1.2 in) wide, forming tufts through branching rootstocks. Its thick, dark green leaves grow in a basal rosette, measuring 0.3 to 1.0 cm long and ranging from spoon-shaped to round, often with small, rounded teeth or shallow lobes. The leaves can be softly hairy or nearly smooth on top, with a rounded tip and a short stalk that tapers at the base.

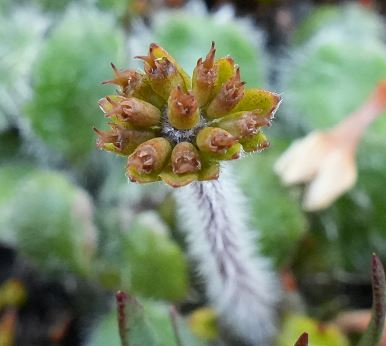
Actinotus bellidioides flower head

Flowering from November to January, a single upright stalk, often hairy, reaches up to 3 cm (1.2 in). At its tip, a tightly clustered head of 6–10 flowers are surrounded by 6–10 small bracts fused at the base into a cup about 6 mm wide. Inner flowers are bisexual, while outer ones are typically male or sterile. Tiny green sepals, about 0.5 mm (19.7 Mil) long, may accompany petals or appear alone. The fruit is a flattened, slightly ridged schizocarp about 0.2 mm (7.9 Mil) long and sheds its sepals when mature.

== Distribution and habitat ==
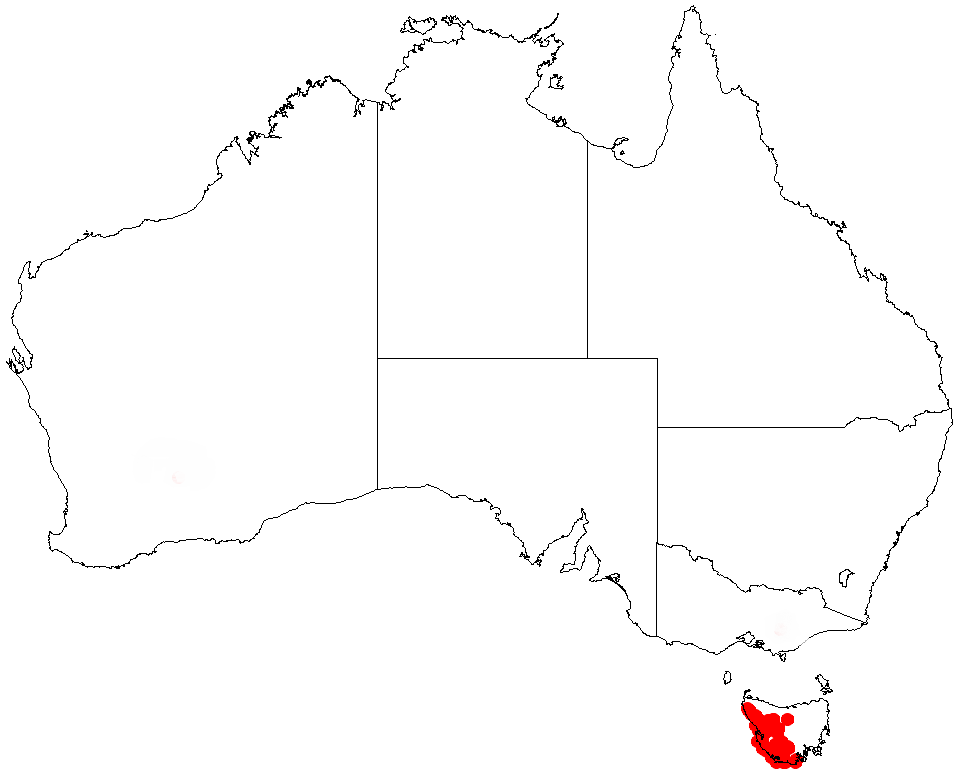
A. bellidioides distribution map from AVH

Actinotus bellidioides typically grows from sea level to 1200 m in moorlands, sedgelands, scrublands, and other waterlogged, peaty habitats in western and southern Tasmania. These ecosystems occupy roughly 17% of the state and lie mostly on metamorphosed Precambrian bedrock with low mineral content and hardened structure, providing few nutrients. Moreover, wet and cold conditions restrict organic matter decomposition, further limiting nutrient availability. As a result, rainfall is the primary nutrient source. These plant communities often feature Gymnoschnoenus spaerocephalus or Lepidosperma filorme and include various Epacridaceae shrubs that compete with A. bellidioides for nutrients. As well as nutrient-poor conditions, A.bellidioides is adapted to tolerate the constant waterlogging, frost, and the high soil acidity that is also limiting vegetation composition in these peaty habitats.

Even in subalpine and alpine regions, herbs in Tasmania’s wet, peaty soils, such as A. bellidioides, are typically perennial, largely because the maritime climate moderates temperature extremes (preventing permanent snow cover) and the low nutrient availability discourages rapid growth. Consequently, A. bellidioides persists through harsh winter conditions rather than adopting a short-lived annual or biennial growth strategy. This long-lived approach is common among numerous Tasmanian plants in subalpine and alpine environments.

== Family and genera ==
The genera Actinotus contains twenty species, nineteen in Australia and one in New Zealand. Actinotus is distinctive within Apiaceae (celery family) for its tight inflorescences surrounded by showy, often woolly bracts that give a daisy-like appearance, setting it apart from the classic umbels typical of the family. Many species of Actinotus, such as A. bellidioides, feature downy or “flannel” hairs on leaves and bracts, providing both a protective function and a uniquely soft texture, however A. bellidioides is the only member in Tasmania exhibiting this feature.
