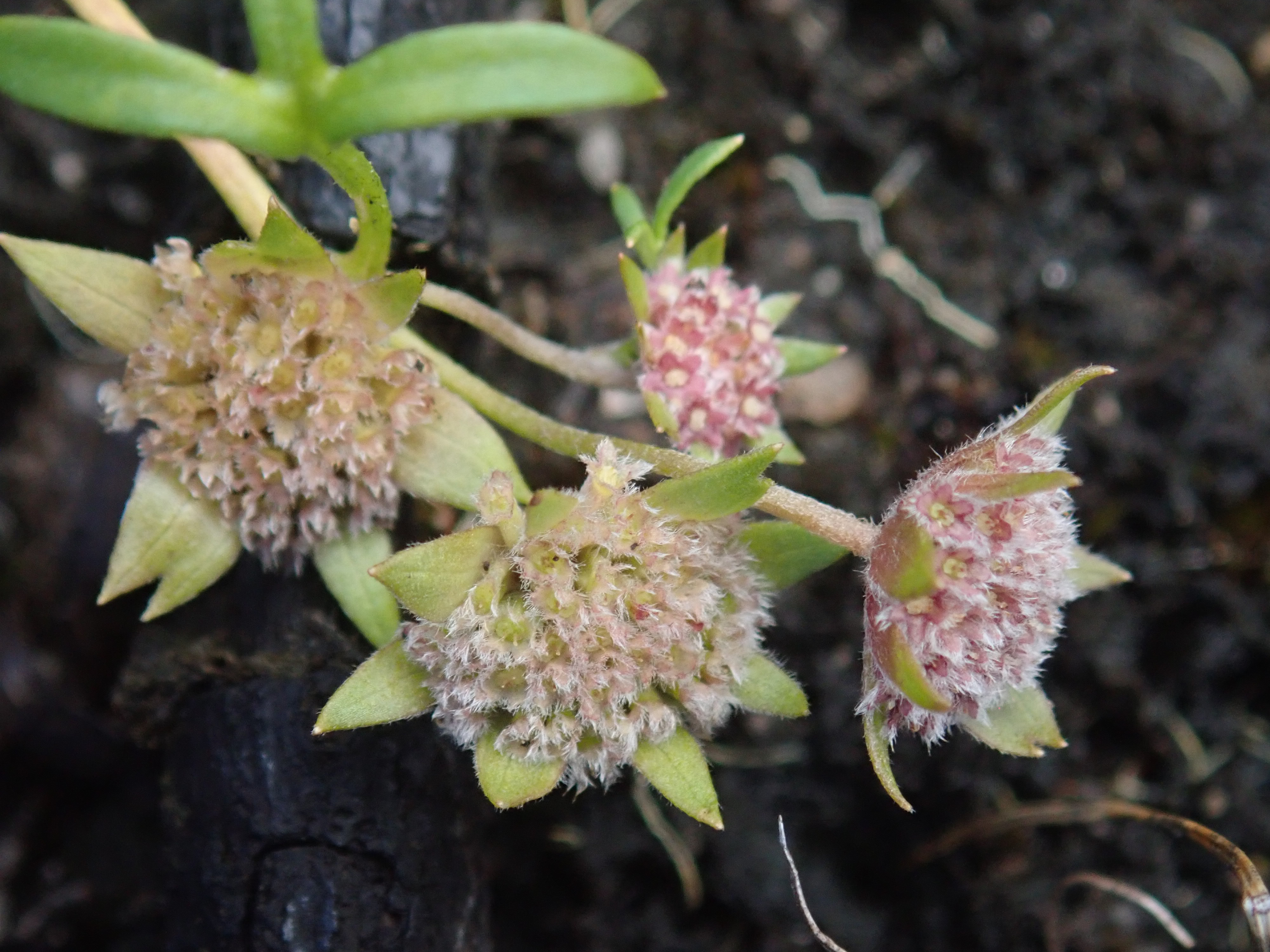
- In Girraween National Park

Scientific classification
- Kingdom: Plantae
- Clade: Tracheophytes
- Clade: Angiosperms
- Clade: Eudicots
- Clade: Asterids
- Order: Apiales
- Family: Apiaceae
- Genus: Actinotus
- Species: A. gibbonsii

Binomial name
- Actinotus gibbonsii F.Muell.
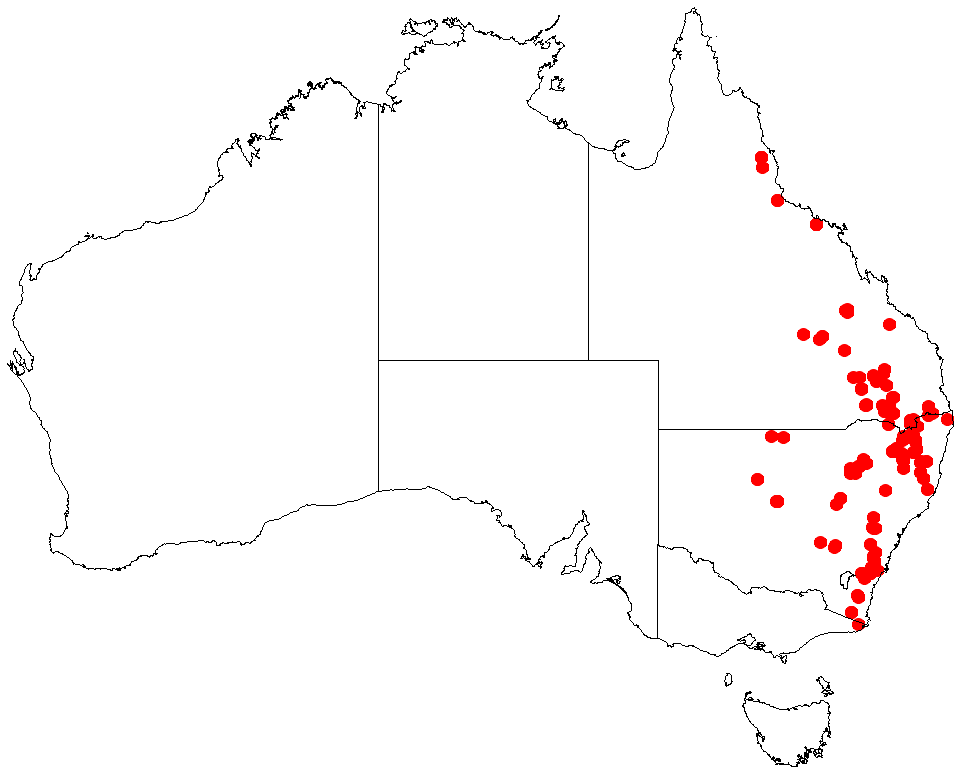
- Occurrence data from AVH

Synonyms
- Actinotus gibbonsii var. baeuerlenii Maiden & Betche

= Actinotus gibbonsii =

Species of flowering plant

Actinotus gibbonsii is a plant in the family Apiaceae, native to the east coast of Australia.

It was first described in 1867 by Ferdinand von Mueller.

It is found in eucalypt woodlands and shrubby heaths in both Queensland and New South Wales.

It has a relatively short life cycle of about a year. Its flowers are pink.
