= Actinotus glomeratus =

Scientific classification
- Kingdom: Plantae
- Clade: Tracheophytes
- Clade: Angiosperms
- Clade: Eudicots
- Clade: Asterids
- Order: Apiales
- Family: Apiaceae
- Genus: Actinotus
- Species: A. glomeratus

Binomial name
- Actinotus glomeratus Benth.

Species of flowering plant

Actinotus glomeratus is a species of flowering plant in the family Apiaceae. It is native to Australia.
