= Actinotus suffocatus =

Scientific classification
- Kingdom: Plantae
- Clade: Tracheophytes
- Clade: Angiosperms
- Clade: Eudicots
- Clade: Asterids
- Order: Apiales
- Family: Apiaceae
- Genus: Actinotus
- Species: A. suffocatus

Binomial name
- Actinotus suffocatus (Hook.f) Rodway

Synonyms
- Hemiphues suffocata Hook.f.

Species of flowering plant

Actinotus suffocatus, the crimson flannelflower, is a small, perennial herb endemic to the Australian State of Tasmania. It is primarily found in high-elevation habitats in wet situations, except in the far south-west of the island, where it occurs down to sea level in continually moist habitats.

== Taxonomy ==
Actinotus suffocatus was described originally as Hemiphues suffocata by Joseph Dalton Hooker from plants gathered by R.C.Gunn at Fatigue Hill (nowadays Calders Lookout), near Mount Arrowsmith, in central western Tasmania, and later transferred by Leonard Rodway to the genus Actinotus.

== Description ==
Actinotus suffocatus is a small, rhizomatous, mat-forming perennial herb with leaves in a basal rosette and a cup-shaped inflorescence of sessile flowers on a short, erect scape.
