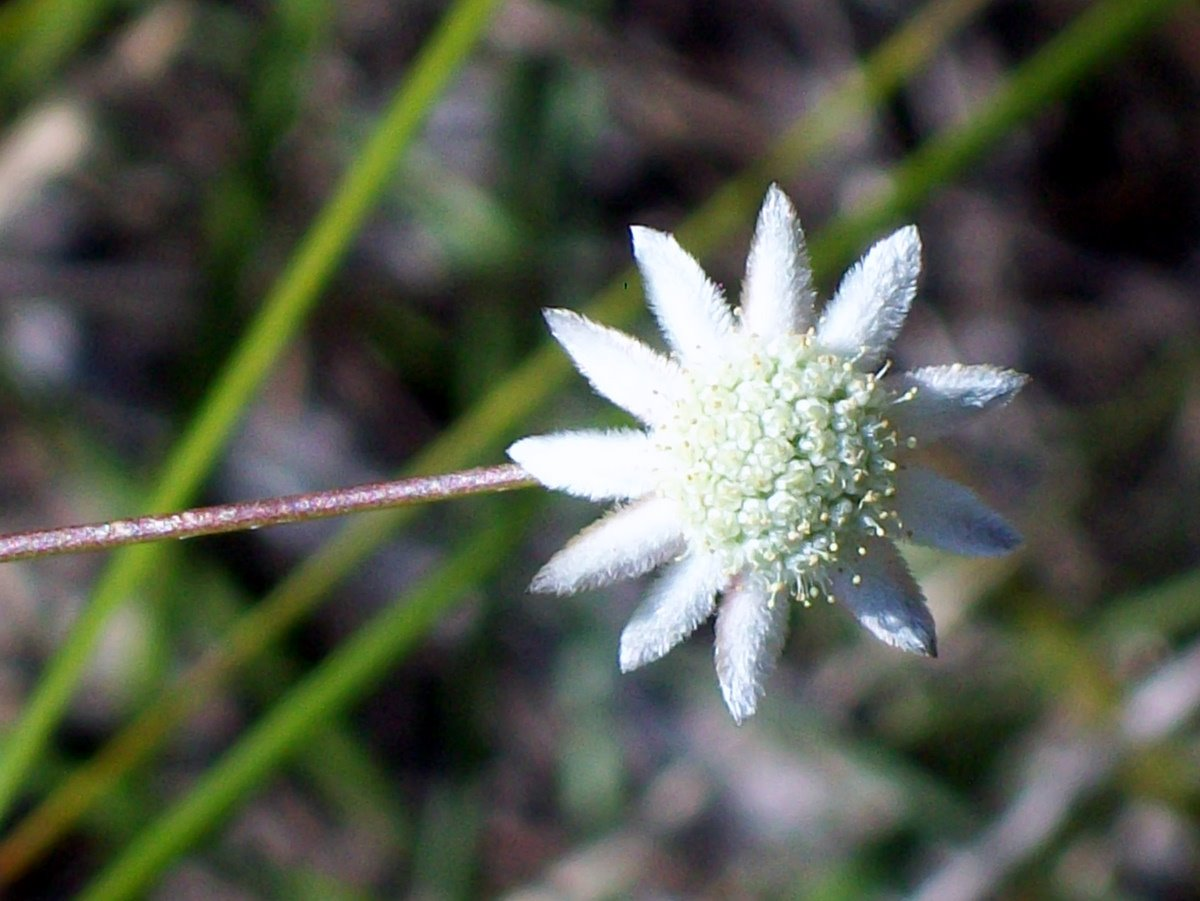
- Actinotus minor at Ku-ring-gai Chase National Park, Australia

Scientific classification
- Kingdom: Plantae
- Clade: Tracheophytes
- Clade: Angiosperms
- Clade: Eudicots
- Clade: Asterids
- Order: Apiales
- Family: Apiaceae
- Genus: Actinotus
- Species: A. minor

Binomial name
- Actinotus minor (Sm.) DC.
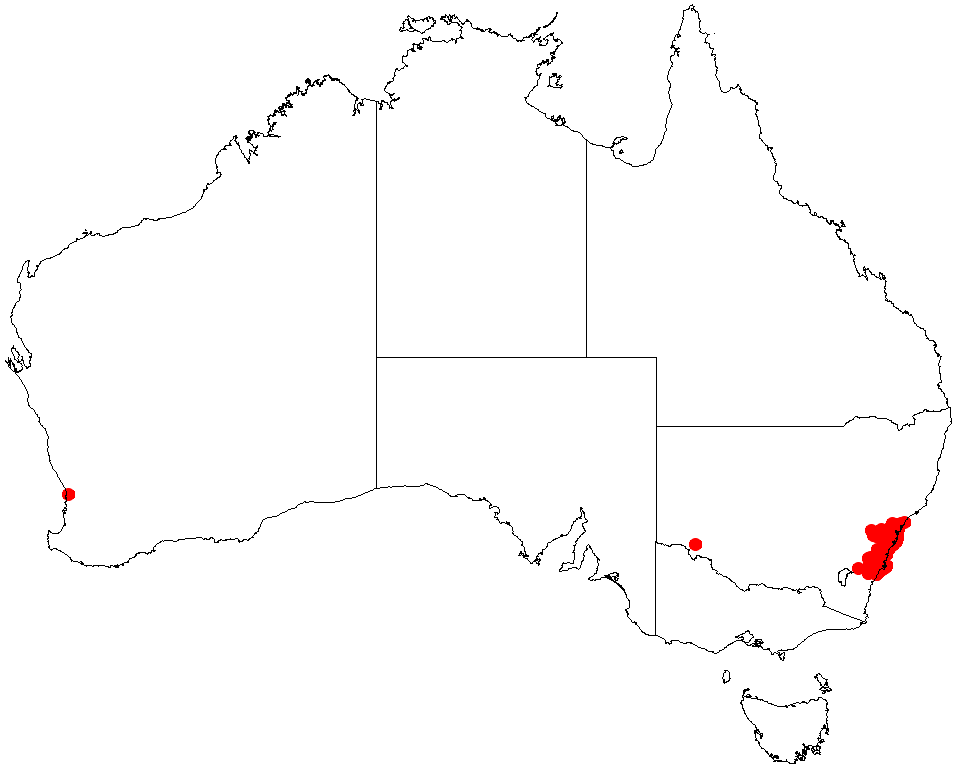
- Occurrence data from AVH

= Actinotus minor =

Lesser flannel flower

Species of flowering plant

Actinotus minor, commonly known as the lesser flannel flower, is species of flowering plant in the family Apiaceae and is endemic to New South Wales. It is a small, sprawling plant with grey-green leaves and white flowers.

== Description ==
Actinotus minor is a small, spreading, perennial herb, 15–50 cm (5.9–19.7 in) high with long, thin stems. The leaves are small and pointed, divided into 3 lobed segments, 6–8 mm (0.24–0.31 in) long, more or less smooth above, hairy and white on the under surface. The leaf stems are slender and up to 12 mm (0.47 in) long. The flower is a cream-white coloured umbel, 3.5–8.5 mm (0.14–0.33 in) in diameter. The bracts are lance-shaped, sometimes dark-tipped, 5–8.5 mm (0.20–0.33 in) long and 0.7–1 mm (0.028–0.039 in) wide, pointed and sparsely hairy on the lower surface. Flowering can occur at any time of the year, the fruit is oval-shaped, 1.9–2.9 mm (0.075–0.114 in) long and 0.8–1.3 mm (0.031–0.051 in) wide.

== Taxonomy and naming ==
Actinotus minor was first formally described in 1830 by Augustin Pyramus de Candolle and the description was published in Prodromus Systematis Naturalis Regni Vegetabilis. The specific epithet (minor) means "smaller".

== Distribution and habitat ==
Lesser flannel flower grows in heath, open dry sclerophyll forests on sandy soils in New South Wales from Ourimbah, south to Milton and Robertson.
