= A Specimen of the Botany of New Holland =

Book by James Edward Smith

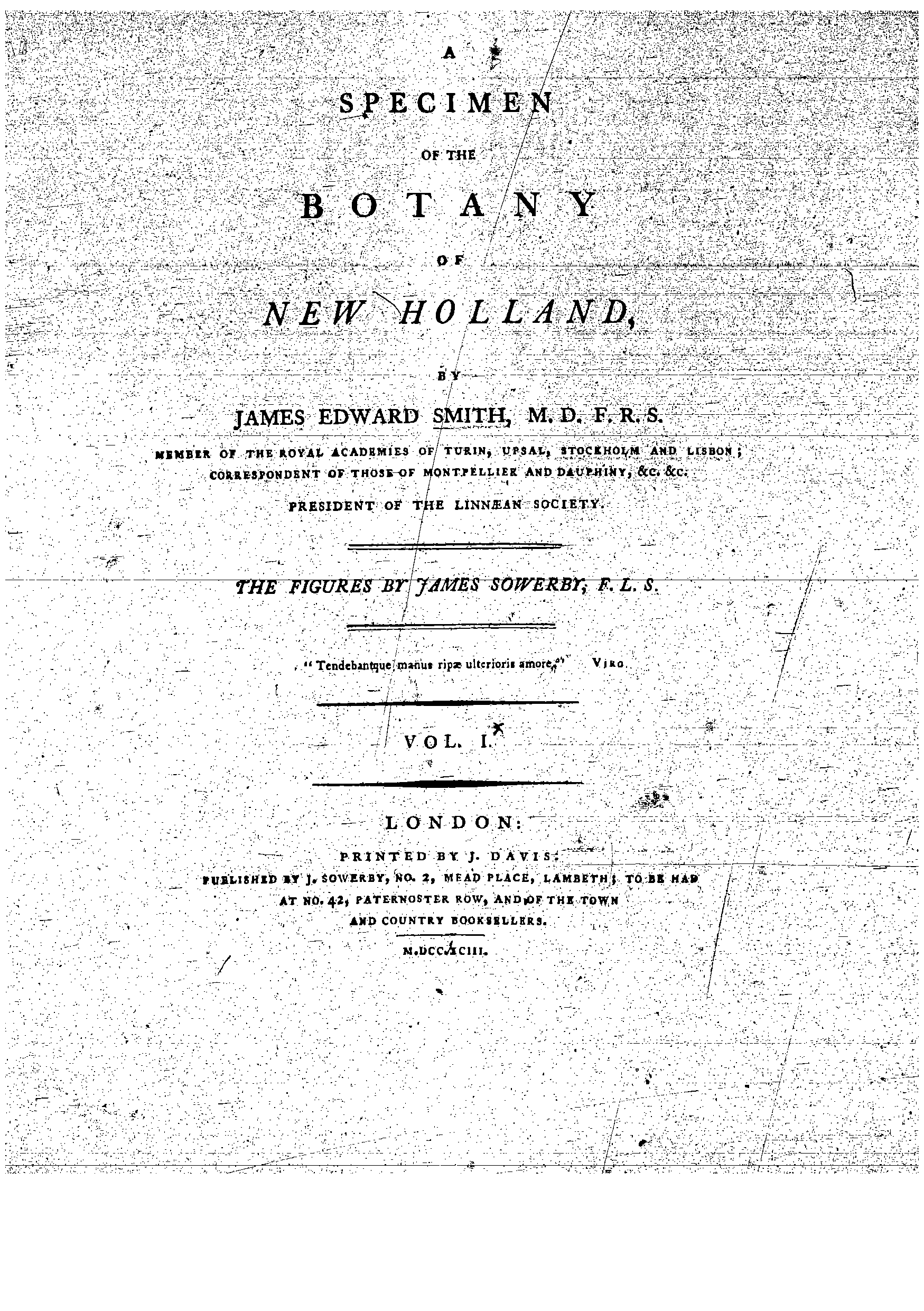
- Title Page
- Author: James Edward Smith
- Illustrator: James Sowerby
- Subject: Flora of Australia
- Genre: Botany
- Publisher: James Sowerby
- Publication date: 1793 to 1795 (4 parts)
- Pages: 40 text 16 colour plates

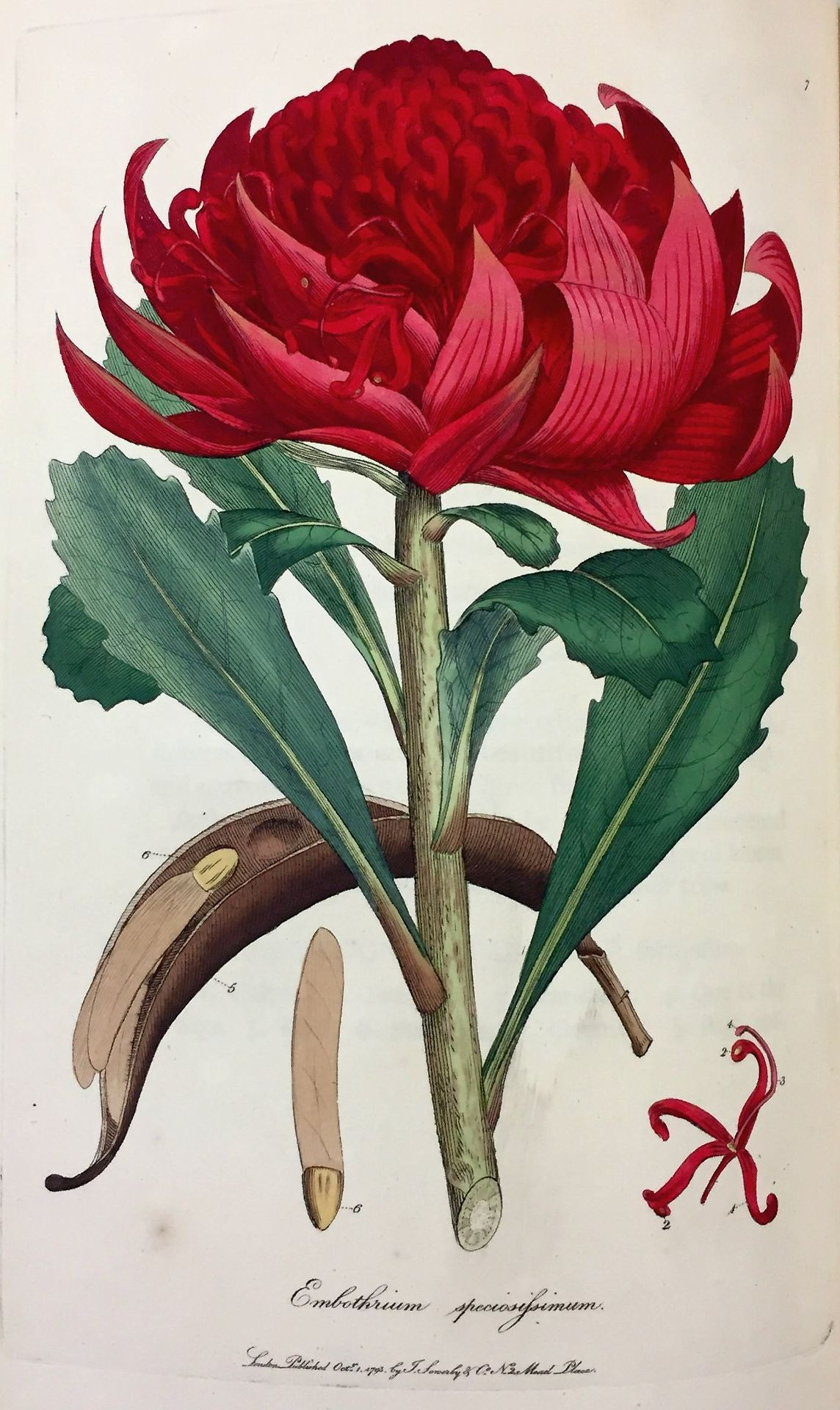
James Sowerby's plate of Embothrium speciosissimum, now Telopea speciosissima (New South Wales Waratah)

A Specimen of the Botany of New Holland, also known by its standard abbreviation Spec. Bot. New Holland, was the first published book on the flora of Australia. Written by James Edward Smith and illustrated by James Sowerby, it was published by Sowerby in four parts between 1793 and 1795. It consists of 16 colour plates of paintings by Sowerby, mostly based on sketches by John White, and around 40 pages of accompanying text. It was presented as the first volume in a series, but no further volumes were released.

== Book ==
The work began as a collaboration between Smith and George Shaw. Together they produced a two-part work entitled Zoology and Botany of New Holland, with each part containing two zoology plates and two botany plates, along with accompanying text. These appeared in 1793, although the publications themselves indicate 1794. The collaboration then ended, and Shaw went on to independently produce his Zoology of New Holland. Smith's contributions to Zoology and Botany of New Holland became the first two parts of A Specimen of the Botany of New Holland, a further two parts of which were issued in 1795.

=== Australian plants listed ===
The book contained details of the following Australian plants:

- Billardiera scandens
- Tetratheca juncea
- Ceratopetalum gummiferum
- Banksia spinulosa (hairpin banksia)
- Goodenia ramosissima, now Scaevola ramosissima
- Platylobium formosum
- Platylobium parviflorum, now Platylobium formosum subsp. parviflorum (not figured)
- Embothrium speciosissimum, now Telopea speciosissima (New South Wales Waratah)
- Embothrium silaifolium, now Lomatia silaifolia
- Embothrium sericeum, now Grevillea sericea
  - E. s. var. minor, now Grevillea sericea
  - E. s. var. major, now Grevillea speciosa (Red Spider Flower)
  - E. s. var. angustifolia, now Grevillea linearifolia
- Embothrium buxifolium, now Grevillea buxifolia (Grey Spider Flower)
- Pimelea linifolia
- Pultenaea stipularis
- Eucalyptus robusta
- Eucalyptus tereticornis (not figured)
- Eucalyptus capitellata (not figured)
- Eucalyptus piperita (previously published by Smith in White's 1790 Journal of a Voyage to New South Wales; not figured)
- Eucalyptus obliqua (previously published by Charles Louis L'Héritier de Brutelle; not figured)
- Eucalyptus corymbosa, now Corymbia gummifera (Unbeknownst to Smith, this had already been published by Joseph Gaertner as Metrosideros gummifera)
- Styphelia tubiflora
- Styphelia ericoides, now Leucopogon ericoides (not figured)
- Styphelia strigosa, now Lissanthe strigosa (not figured)
- Styphelia scoparia, now Monotoca scoparia (not figured)
- Styphelia daphnoides, now Brachyloma daphnoides (not figured)
- Styphelia lanceolata, now Leucopogon lanceolatus (not figured)
- Styphelia elliptica, now Monotoca elliptica (not figured)
- Mimosa myrtifolia, now Acacia myrtifolia
- Mimosa hispidula, now Acacia hispidula
