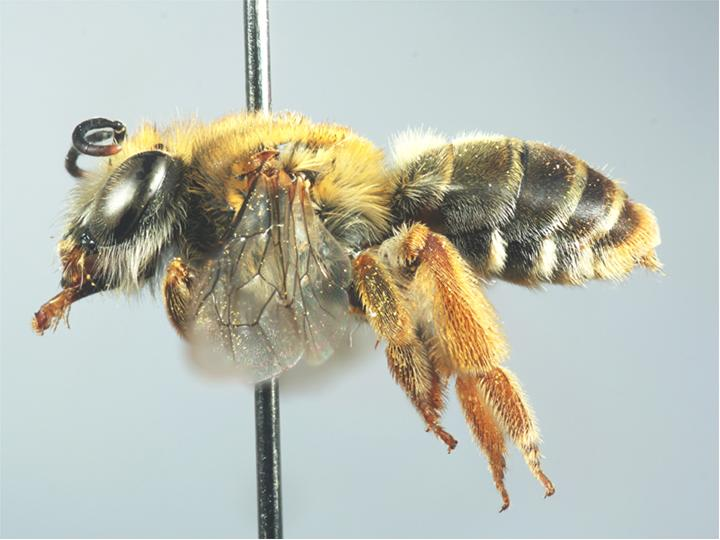
- Female

Scientific classification
- Kingdom: Animalia
- Phylum: Arthropoda
- Clade: Pancrustacea
- Class: Insecta
- Order: Hymenoptera
- Family: Colletidae
- Genus: Trichocolletes
- Species: T. fuscus

Binomial name
- Trichocolletes fuscus Batley & Houston, 2012

= Trichocolletes fuscus =

Species of bee

Trichocolletes fuscus is a species of bee in the family Colletidae and the subfamily Colletinae. It is endemic to Australia. It was described in 2012 by Australian entomologists Michael Batley and Terry Houston.

== Etymology ==
The specific epithet fuscus (Latin: 'dusky') refers to the species' colouration.

== Description ==
The body length is about 10–11 mm. The eyes are hairy. Colouration is mainly black and dark- to orange-brown, and with pale to bright orange hair. The species has narrow gold metasomal bands.

== Distribution and habitat ==
The species occurs in central New South Wales from the western plains to the coast. The type locality is the Munghorn Gap Nature Reserve in the Central Tablelands region.

== Behaviour ==
The adults are flying mellivores. Flowering plants visited by the bees include Daviesia ulicifolia, Dillwynia retorta, Eutaxia microphylla, Leucopogon ericoides, Leucopogon lanceolatus, Pultenaea microphylla and Templetonia aculeata.

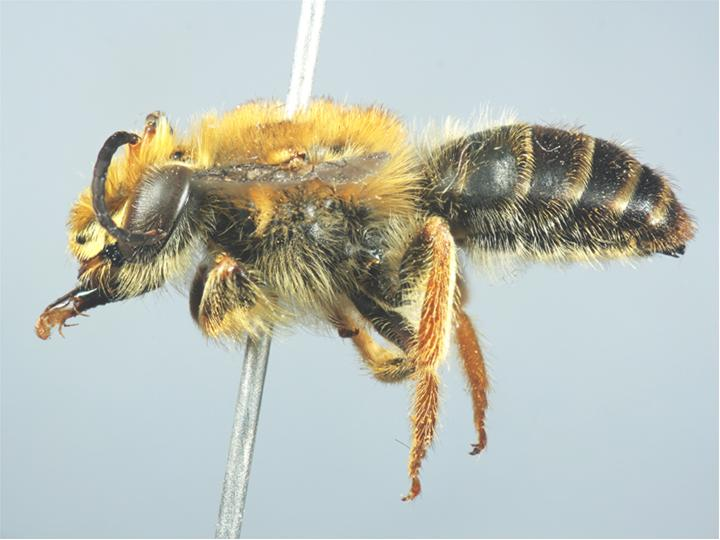
Male
