= Leioproctus punctatifrons =

Scientific classification
- Kingdom: Animalia
- Phylum: Arthropoda
- Clade: Pancrustacea
- Class: Insecta
- Order: Hymenoptera
- Family: Colletidae
- Genus: Leioproctus
- Species: L. punctatifrons

Binomial name
- Leioproctus punctatifrons Batley, 2025

Species of bee

Leioproctus punctatifrons, or Leioproctus (Euryglossidia) punctatifrons, is a species of bee in the family Colletidae and subfamily Colletinae. It is endemic to Australia. It was described by entomologist Michael Batley in 2025.

== Etymology ==
The specific epithet punctatifrons is an anatomical reference to the strongly punctate frons and scutum.

== Description ==
The female body length is 7.3 mm, the male 5.8 mm. Integumental colouration is mainly black, the metasoma orange-brown. The hair is white to brown.

== Distribution and habitat ==
The species occurs in eastern New South Wales. The type locality is Commodore Heights, Sydney.

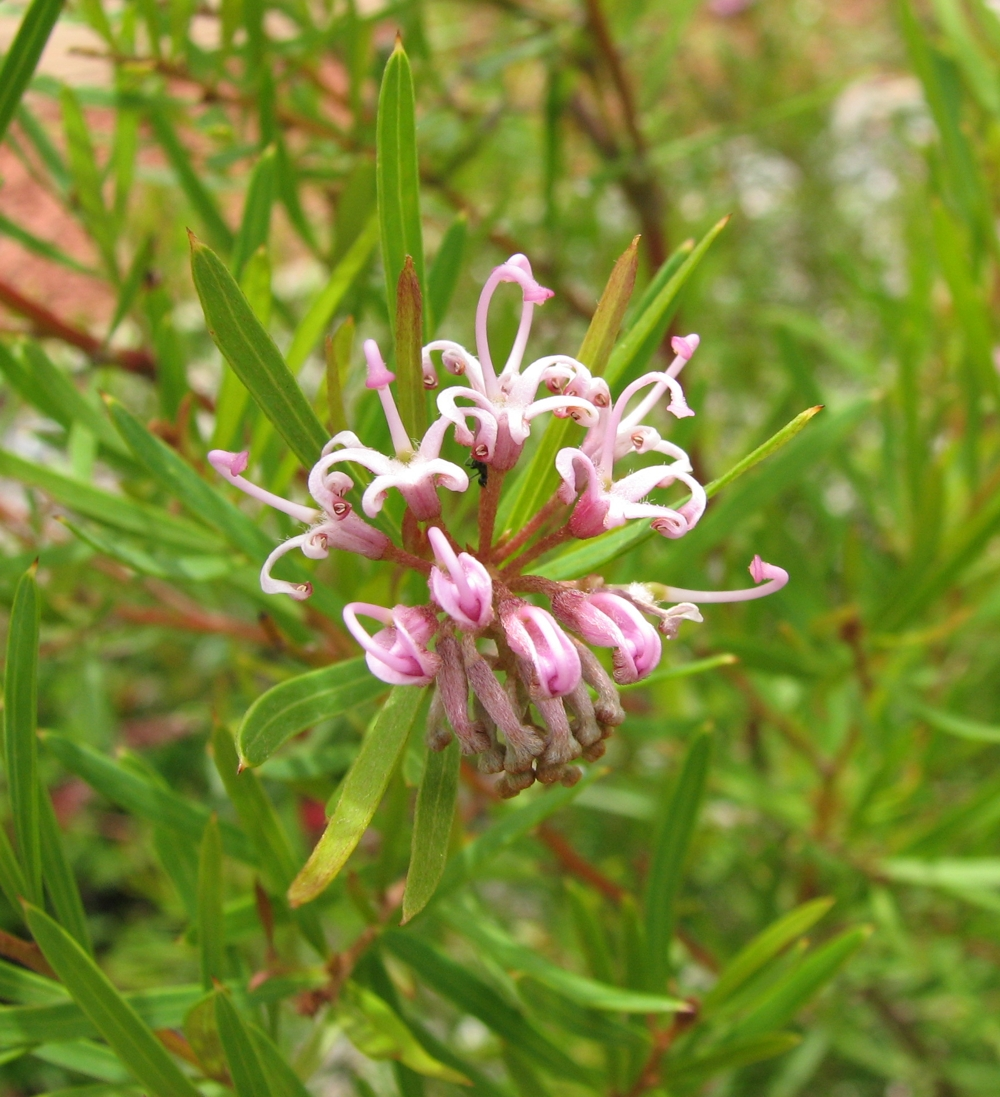
Grevillea sericea (pink spider flower), a forage plant of the bees

== Behaviour ==
The adults are flying mellivores. Flowering plants visited by the bees include Grevillea sericea.
