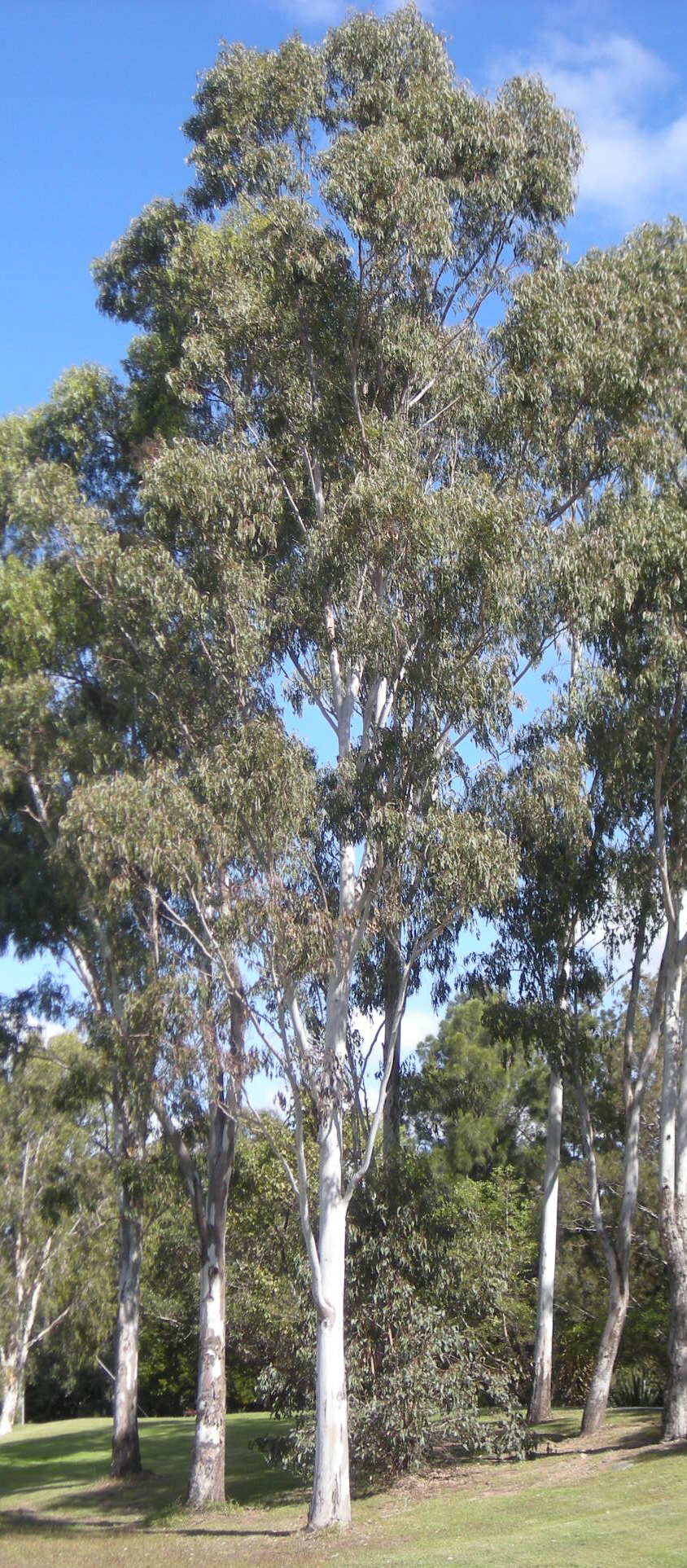

Conservation status
- Least Concern (IUCN 3.1)

Scientific classification
- Kingdom: Plantae
- Clade: Tracheophytes
- Clade: Angiosperms
- Clade: Eudicots
- Clade: Rosids
- Order: Myrtales
- Family: Myrtaceae
- Genus: Eucalyptus
- Species: E. tereticornis

Binomial name
- Eucalyptus tereticornis Sm.

Synonyms
- Eucalyptus populifolia Desf.; Eucalyptus teretecornis Grimwade orth. var.

= Eucalyptus tereticornis =

Forest red gum, blue gum, red irongum

Species of eucalyptus

Eucalyptus tereticornis, commonly known as forest red gum, blue gum or red irongum, is a species of tree that is native to eastern Australia and southern New Guinea. It has smooth bark, lance-shaped to curved adult leaves, flower buds in groups of seven, nine or eleven, white flowers and hemispherical fruit.

== Description ==
Eucalyptus tereticornis is a tree that typically grows to a height of 20–50 m (66–164 ft) and forms a lignotuber. The trunk is straight, usually unbranched for more than half of the total height of the tree and has a girth of up to 2 m (6 ft 7 in) dbh. Thereafter, limbs are unusually steeply inclined for a Eucalyptus species. The bark is shed in irregular sheets, resulting in a smooth trunk surface coloured in patches of white, grey and blue, corresponding to areas that shed their bark at different times. Young plants and coppice regrowth have dull bluish green, egg-shaped leaves that are 60–130 mm (2.4–5.1 in) long and 30–80 mm (1.2–3.1 in) wide. Adult leaves are the same shade of green on both sides, lance-shaped to curved, 80–220 mm (3.1–8.7 in) long and 10–35 mm (0.39–1.38 in) wide, tapering at the base to a petiole 13–30 mm (0.51–1.18 in) long. The flower buds are arranged in leaf axils in groups of seven, nine or eleven on an unbranched peduncle 7–25 mm (0.28–0.98 in) long, the individual buds on pedicels 2–6 mm (0.079–0.236 in) long. Mature buds are an elongated oval shape, 9–16 mm (0.35–0.63 in) long and 3–6 mm (0.12–0.24 in) wide with a conical to horn-shaped operculum that is much longer than the floral cup. Flowering has been recorded in most months and the flowers are white. The fruit is a woody, hemispherical capsule 2–6 mm (0.079–0.236 in) long and 4–8 mm (0.16–0.31 in) wide with the valves prominently protruding.

== Taxonomy and naming ==
Eucalyptus tereticornis was first formally described 1795 by James Edward Smith in A Specimen of the Botany of New Holland from specimens collected in 1793 from Port Jackson by First Fleet surgeon and naturalist John White. (Smith's volume was the botanical part of Zoology and Botany of New Holland. The zoological part was written by George Shaw.) The specific epithet (tereticornis) is from the Latin words teres (becoming tereti- in the combined form) meaning "terete" and cornu meaning "horn", in reference to the horn-shaped operculum.

In 1999 Ian Brooker and Andrew Slee described two subspecies and in 2013 Anthony Bean described a further two, and the names of these four subspecies are accepted by the Australian Plant Census:

- Eucalyptus tereticornis subsp. basaltica A.R.Bean has opercula that are not expanded at the base, juvenile leaves that are dull bluish, egg-shaped to round, up to one to two times as long as broad, and pedicels 2.5–6 mm (0.098–0.236 in) long;
- Eucalyptus tereticornis subsp. mediana Brooker & Slee has opercula that are not expanded at the base, juvenile leaves that are dull bluish, egg-shaped to round, up to one to two times as long as broad, and pedicels 1–3 mm (0.039–0.118 in) long;
- Eucalyptus tereticornis subsp. rotunda A.R.Bean has opercula that are not expanded at the base, juvenile leaves that are green, round and up to 1.2 times as long as broad;
- Eucalyptus tereticornis Sm. subsp. tereticornis has opercula expanded at the base and juvenile leaves that are lance-shaped to egg-shaped, and two to three times longer than wide.

== Distribution and habitat ==
The species has a wide distribution, occurring over the widest range of latitudes of any Eucalyptus species, occurring from southern Papua New Guinea at latitude 15°S, to southeastern Victoria at latitude 38°S. The forest red gum is one of the key canopy species of the threatened Cumberland Plain Woodlands.

Subspecies basaltica grows in eucalypt woodland from Kroombit Tops to near Sydney with a disjunct population in the Carnarvon Range. Subspecies mediana is endemic to eastern Victoria where it grows near river banks, wetlands, low hills and plains. Subspecies rotunda is endemic to a small area near Mitchell in Queensland, growing along creek banks. Subspecies tereticornis is the most widely distributed of the four subspecies and grows in open forest from the Cape York Peninsula in Queensland, to near Bega in southern New South Wales and as far inland as Roma. It is also known from the Central and Oro Provinces in Papua New Guinea.

== Uses ==
The tree has a strong, hard and durable heartwood, with a density of about 1100 kg m^{−3}. It is used for construction in heavy engineering, such as for railway sleepers. The leaves of E. tereticornis are used in the production of cineole based eucalyptus oil.

== Regional ecosystems ==
Some regional ecosystems in Queensland which contain Eucalyptus tereticornis as a dominant or co-dominant tree species are classified as 'of concern' or 'endangered' under the Queensland Vegetation Management Act 1999. Forest and woodlands of this species which occur on alluvium have been extensively cleared for agriculture. Remnant vegetation in the South-East Queensland Bioregion are listed as endangered with less than 10% of their preclearing extent remaining.

== Gallery ==
Features of the forest red gum (Eucalyptus tereticornis)

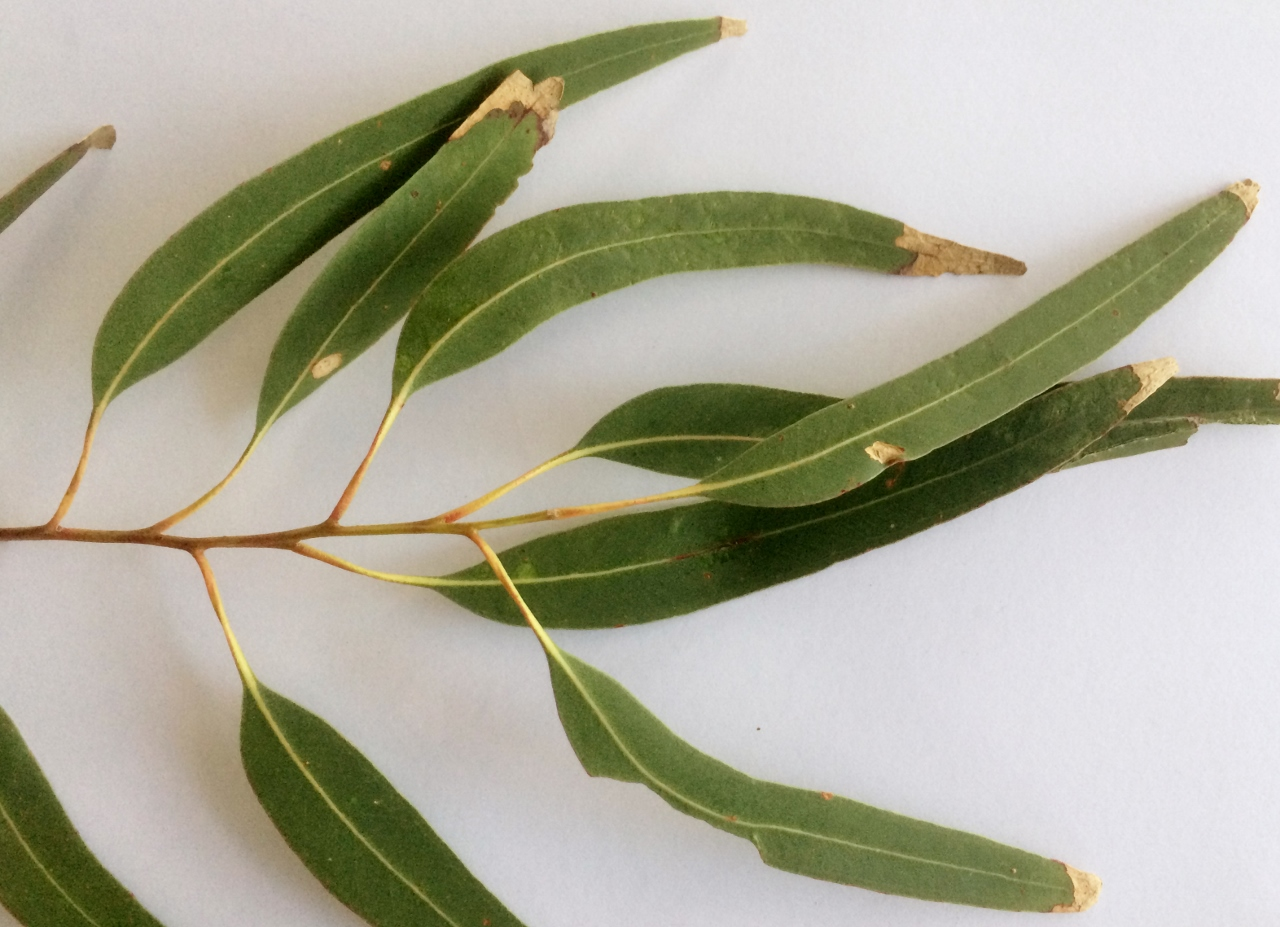
Adult leaves

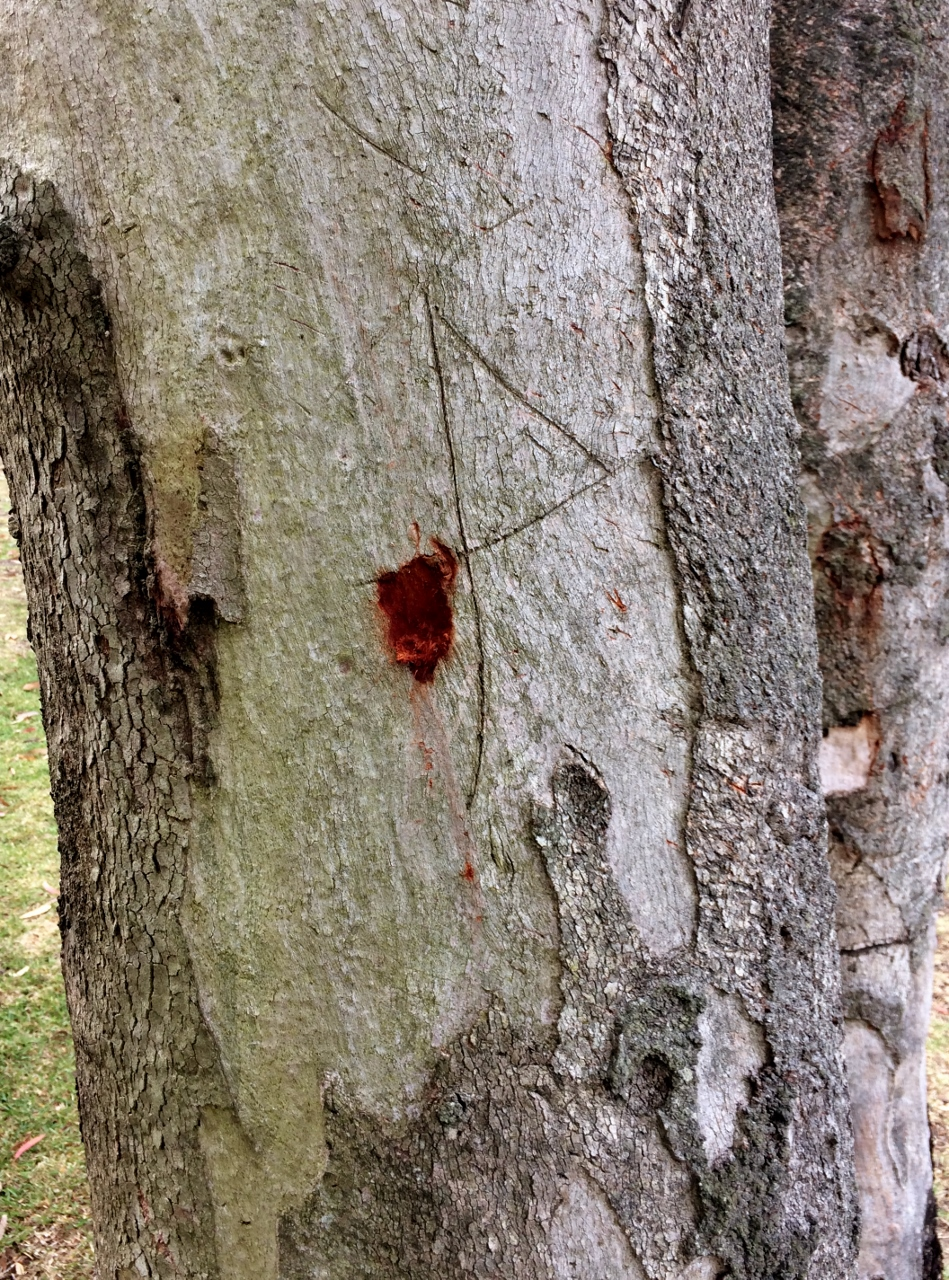
Trunk bark

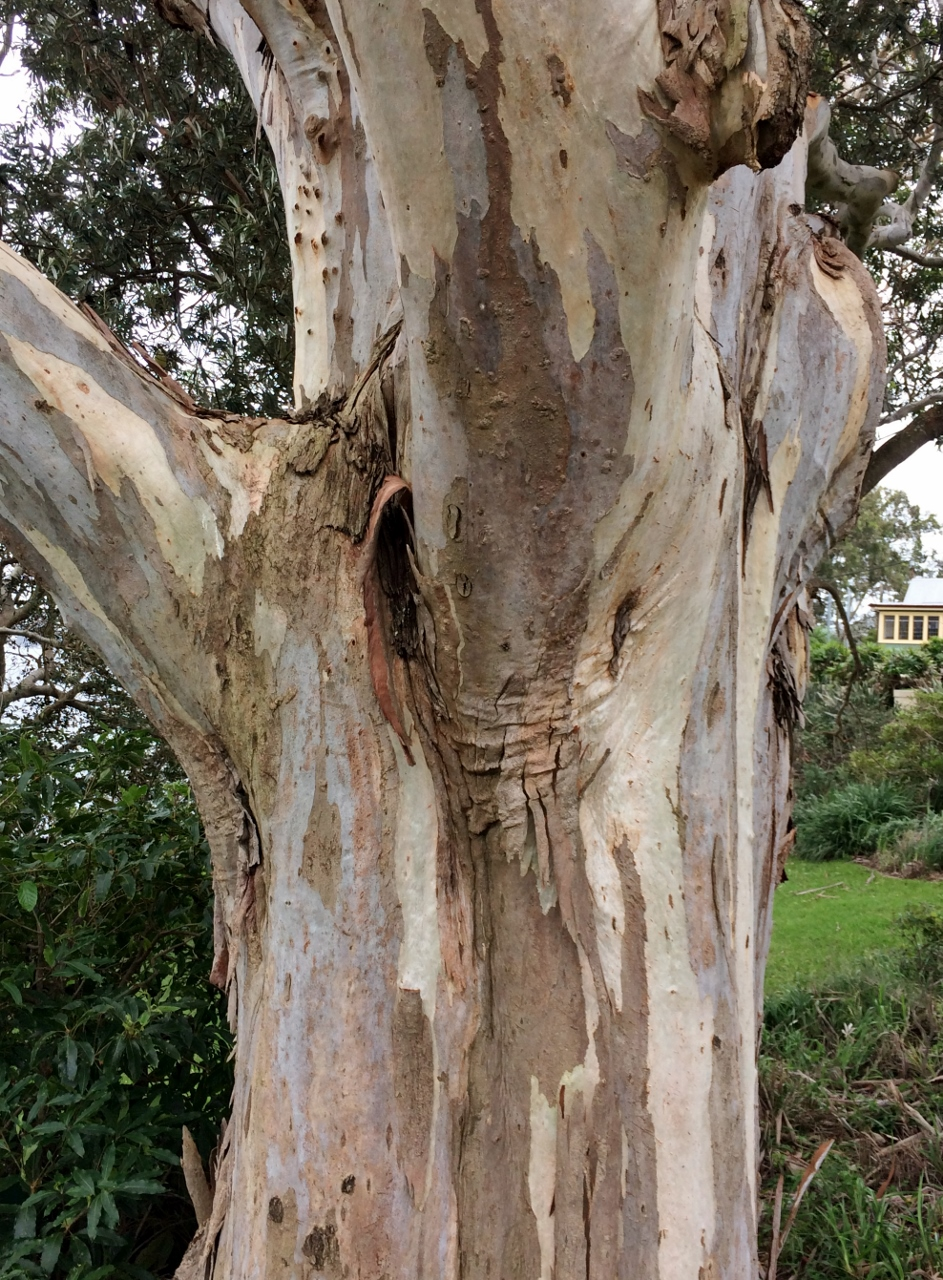
Trunk

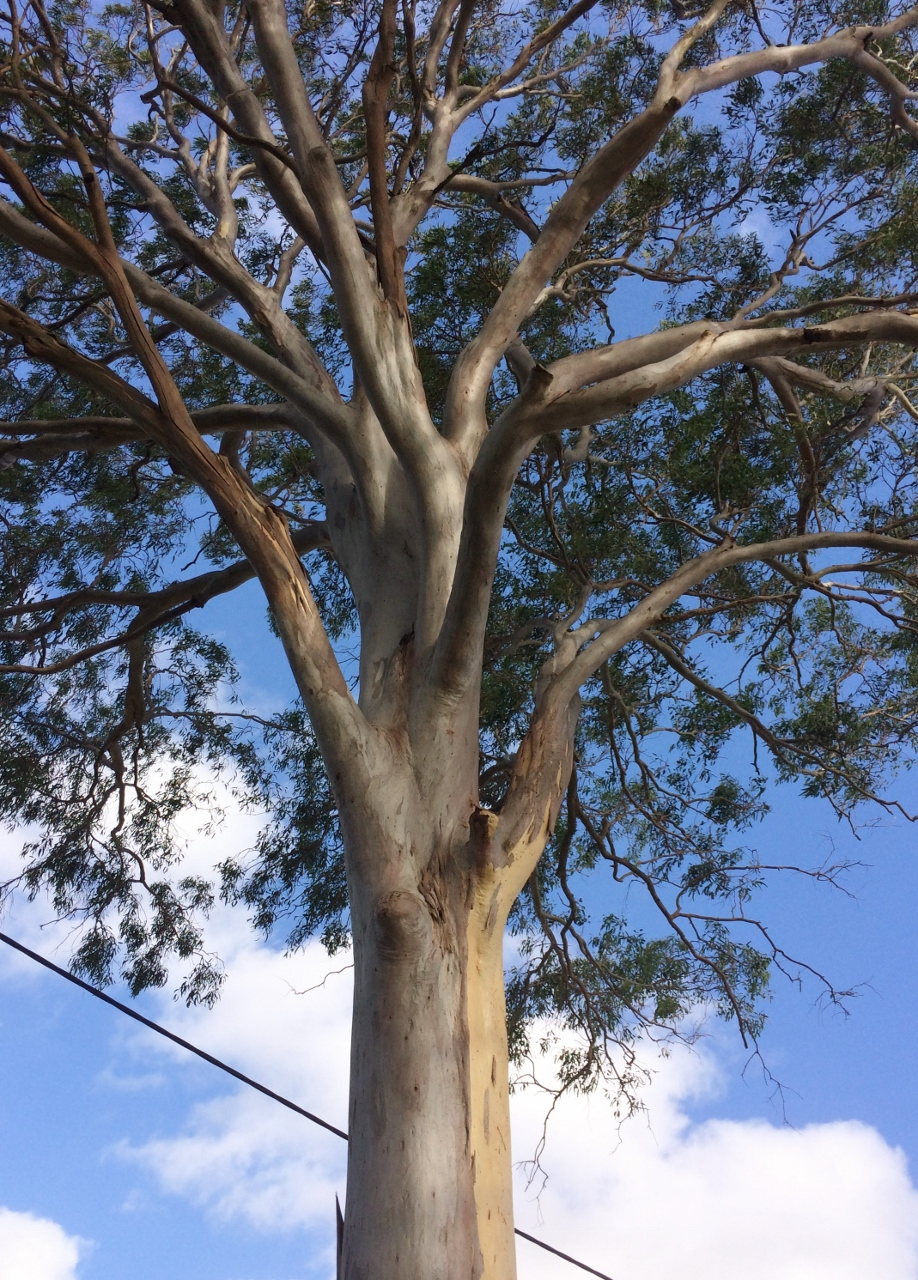
Upper branches

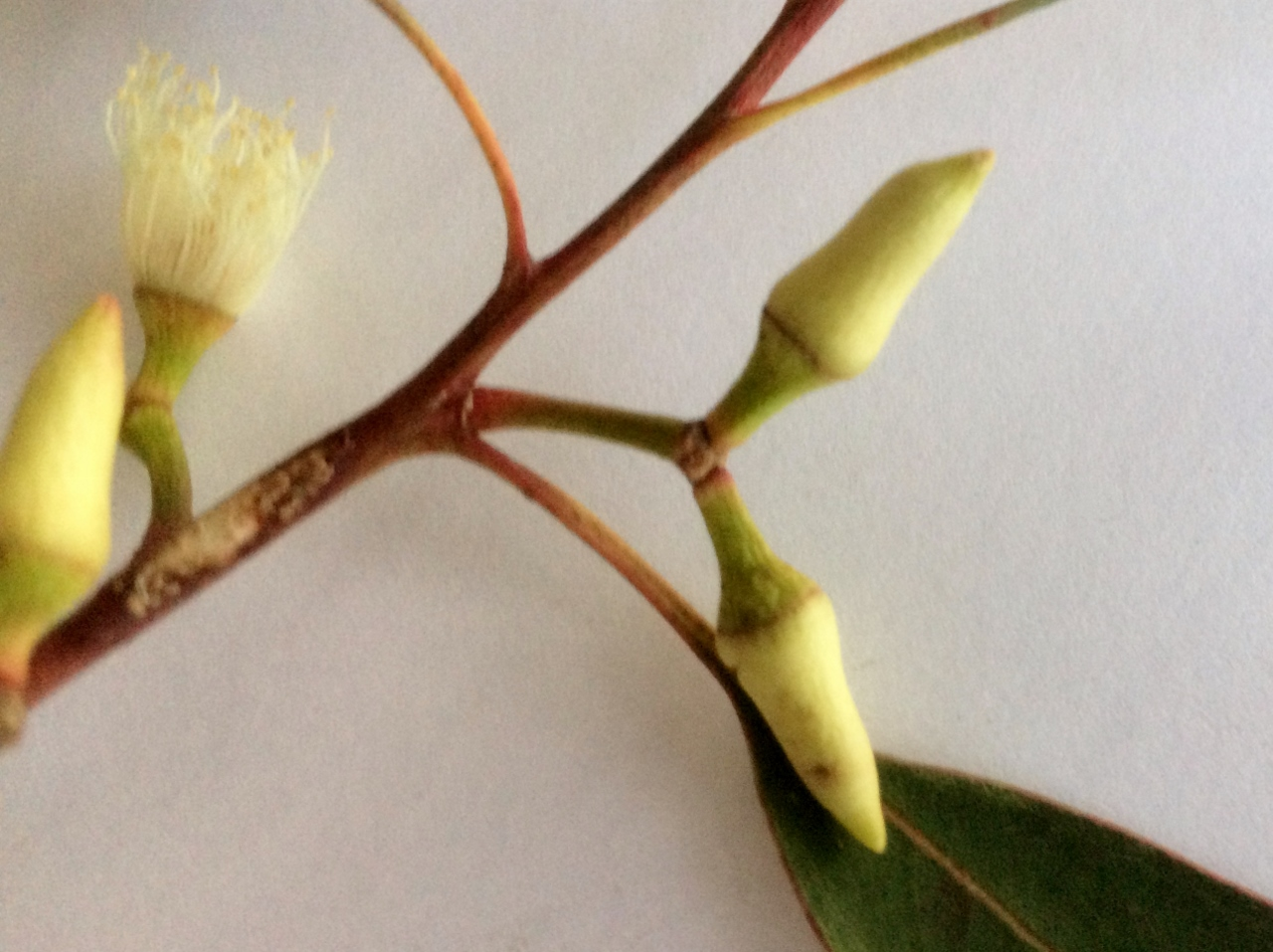
Buds

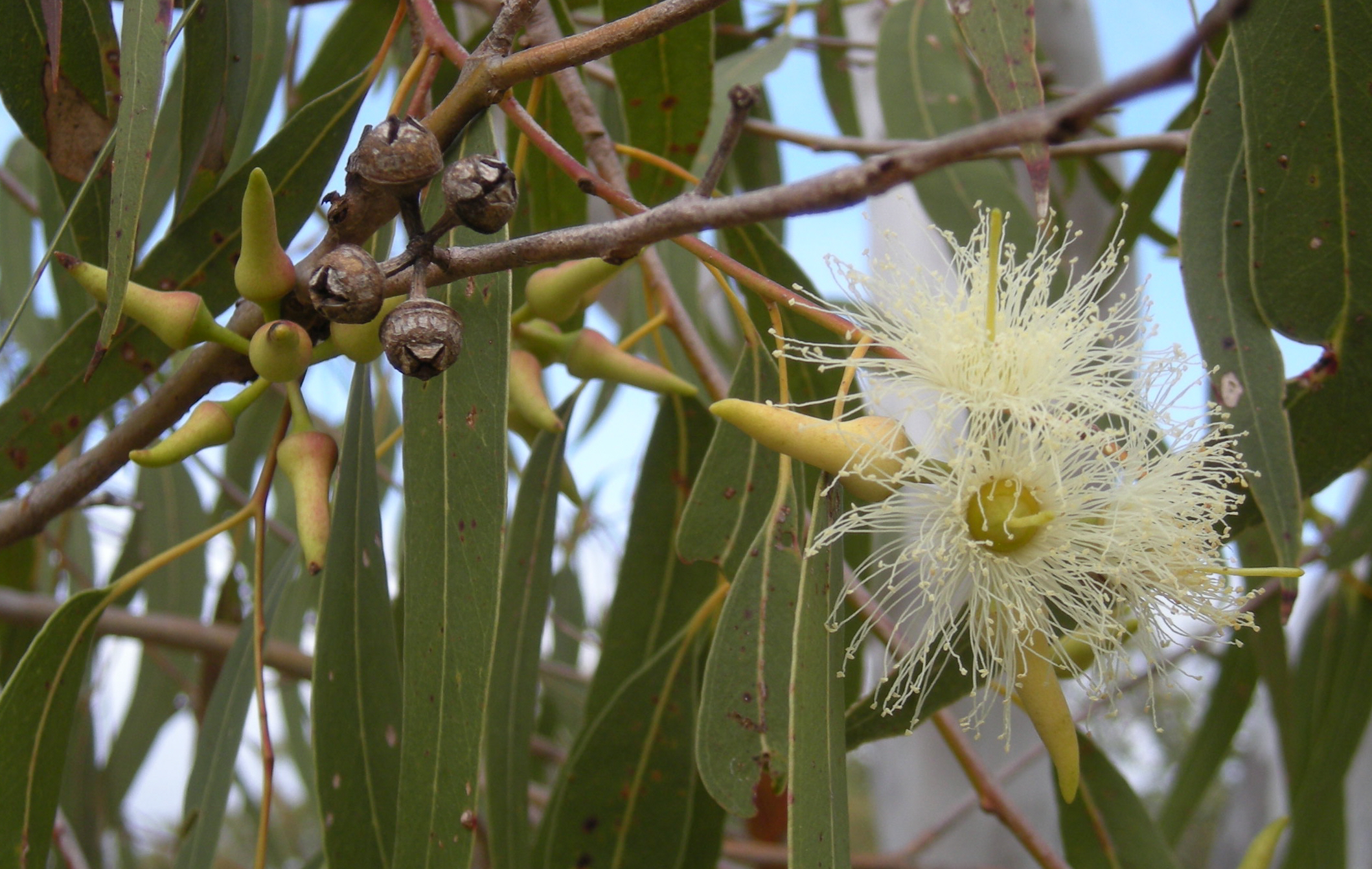
Inflorescence

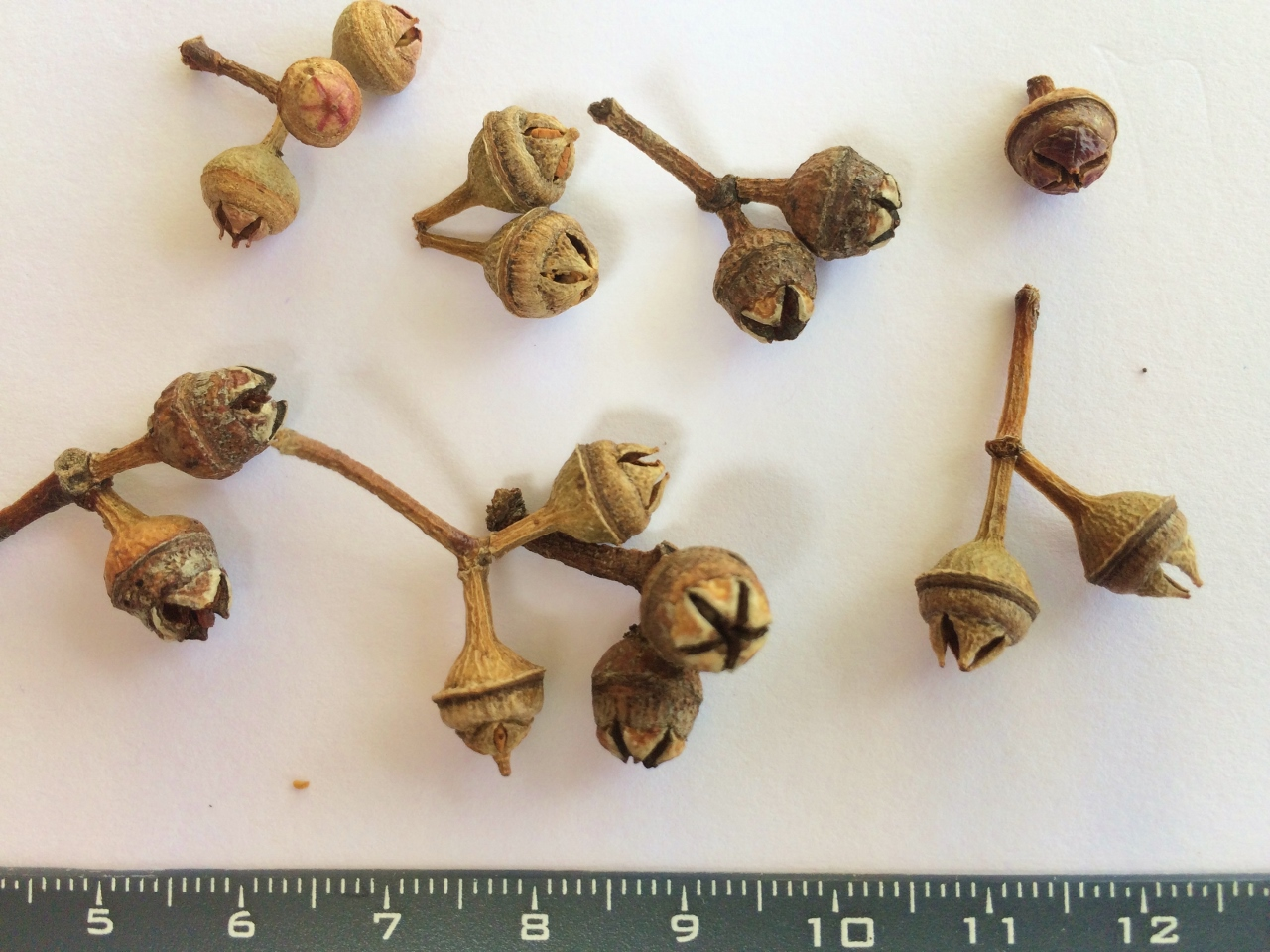
Fruit

== See also ==
- List of Eucalyptus species
