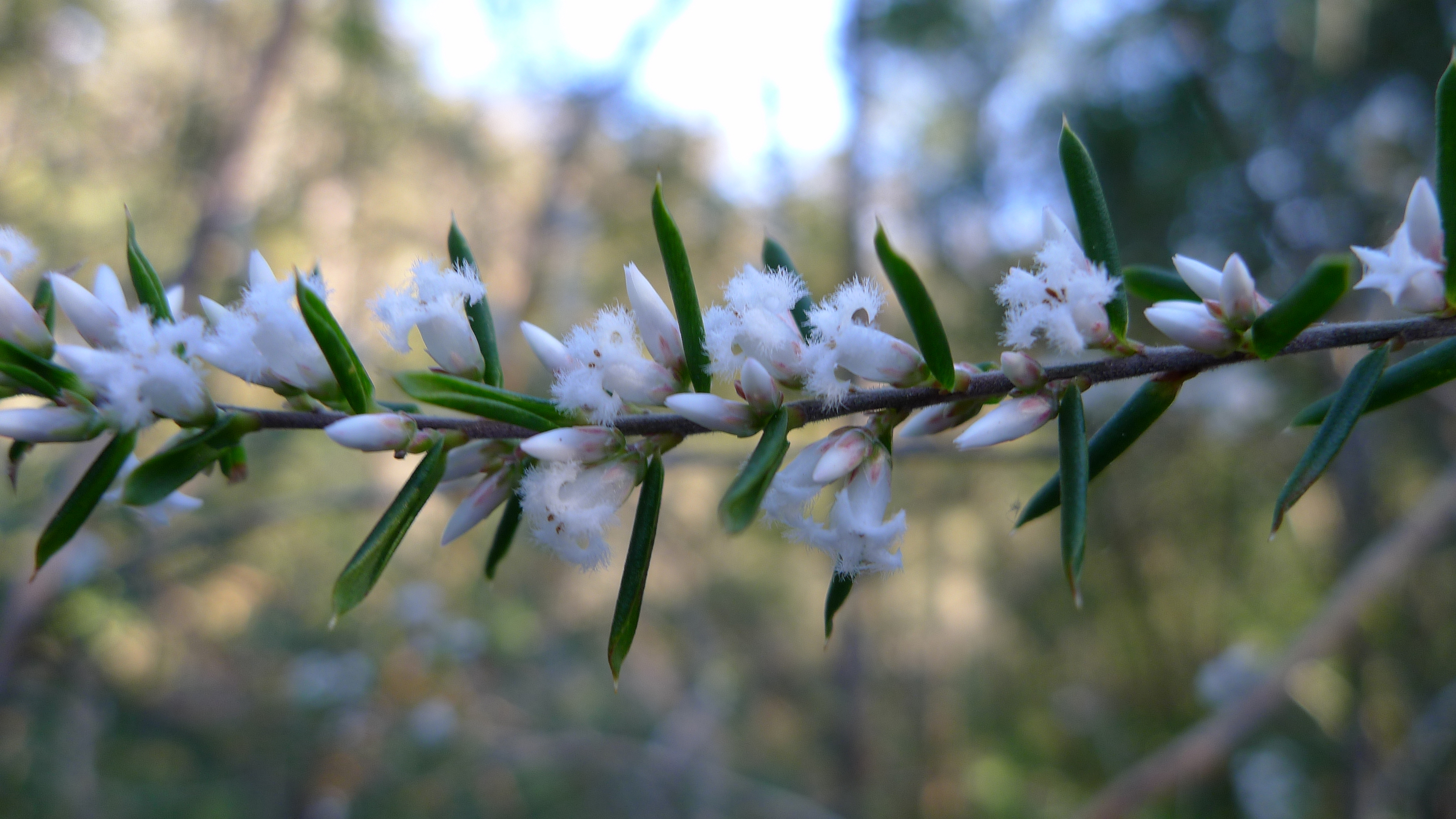
- In Heathcote National Park

Scientific classification
- Kingdom: Plantae
- Clade: Tracheophytes
- Clade: Angiosperms
- Clade: Eudicots
- Clade: Asterids
- Order: Ericales
- Family: Ericaceae
- Genus: Styphelia
- Species: S. ericoides

Binomial name
- Styphelia ericoides Sm.
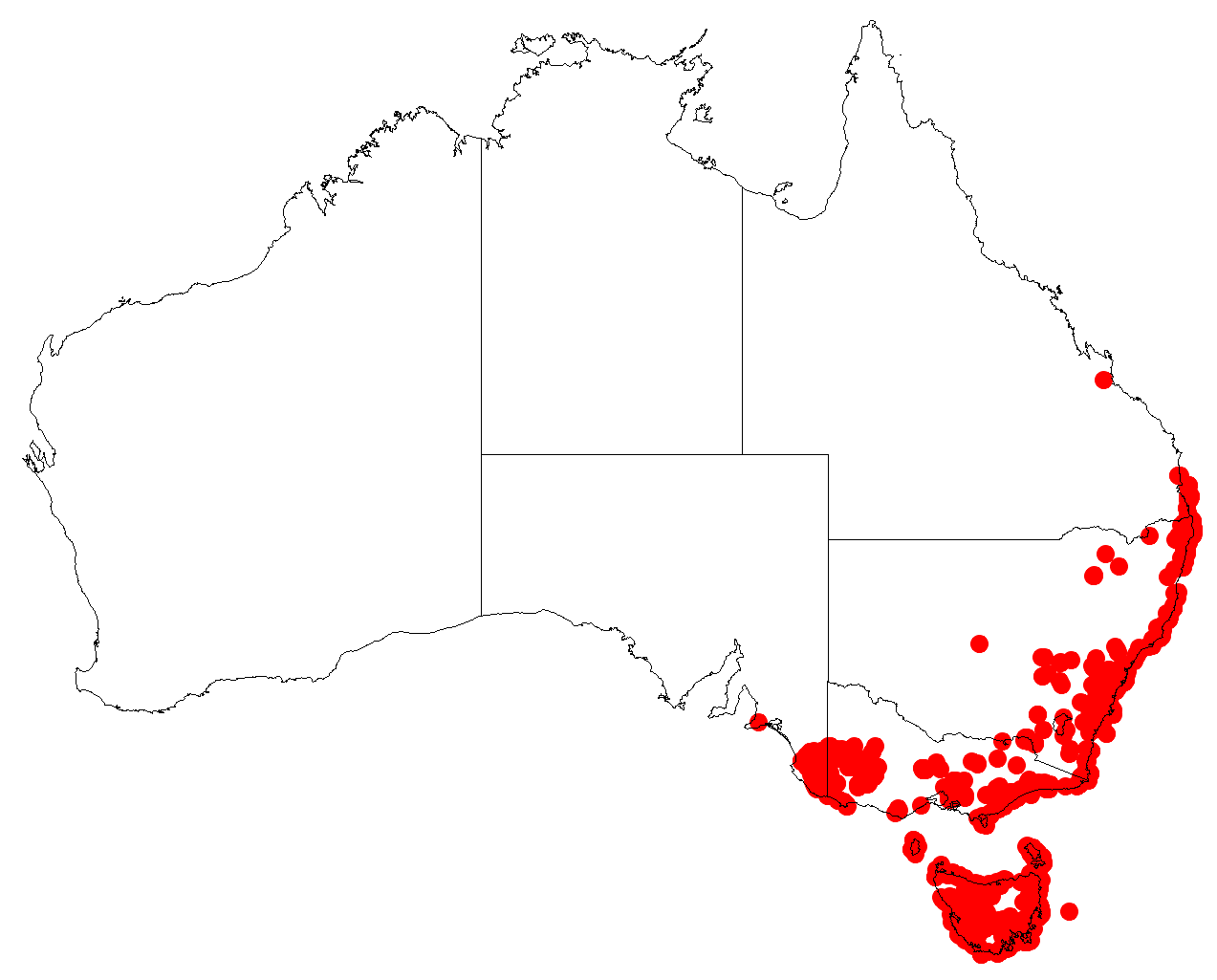
- Occurrence data from AVH

Synonyms
- Leucopogon ericoides (Sm.) R.Br.; Epacris spuria Cav.; Leucopogon milliganii Gand. nom. illeg.; Leucopogon obovatus DC.; Leucopogon trichocarpus (Labill.) R.Br.; Styphelia spuria (Cav.) Poir.; Styphelia trichocarpa Labill.

= Styphelia ericoides =

Pink beard-heath

Species of shrub

Styphelia ericoides, commonly known as the pink beard-heath, is a species of flowering plant in the heath family Ericaceae and is endemic to south-eastern Australia. It is a slender shrub with oblong leaves, and white to pinkish, tube-shaped flowers.

== Description ==
Styphelia ericoides is a slender shrub that typically grows to a height of 0.3–2 m (1 ft 0 in – 6 ft 7 in), its branchlets softly hairy. The leaves are oblong, sometimes elliptic, 3–15 mm (0.12–0.59 in) long, 1.0–2.5 mm (0.039–0.098 in) wide and sessile, the upper surface dished, often with the edges curved downwards, and with a small point up to 1 mm (0.039 in) long on the tip. The flowers are white to pale pink and arranged on peduncles 1–3 mm (0.039–0.118 in) long in upper leaf axils, forming a spike 3–9 mm (0.12–0.35 in) long with egg-shaped bracteoles 1.0–1.5 mm (0.039–0.059 in) long. The sepals are egg-shaped, 1.4–2.1 mm (0.055–0.083 in) long, the petals joined at the base to form a tube 1.5–2.2 mm (0.059–0.087 in) long, the lobes 1.4–2.0 mm (0.055–0.079 in) long and softly-hairy inside. Flowering occurs from July to October and is followed by an often-curved oval drupe 2.4–5.7 mm (0.094–0.224 in) long.

== Taxonomy ==
Styphelia ericoides was first formally described by James Edward Smith in A Specimen of the Botany of New Holland. The specific epithet (ericoides) means "Erica-like".

== Distribution and habitat ==
Pink beard-heath is widespread and common in south-east Queensland, the coast, tablelands and slopes of eastern New South Wales, southern Victoria, the far south-east of South Australia and Tasmania, where it grows in heath, forest and woodland.

== Ecology ==
In the Sydney region, S. ericoides is associated with Sydney peppermint (Eucalyptus piperita), scribbly gum (E. sclerophylla) and narrow-leaved apple (Angophora bakeri). Plants live between five and twenty years, are killed by fire and regenerate from seed which lies dormant in the soil. Bees seek out the flowers for their nectar.
