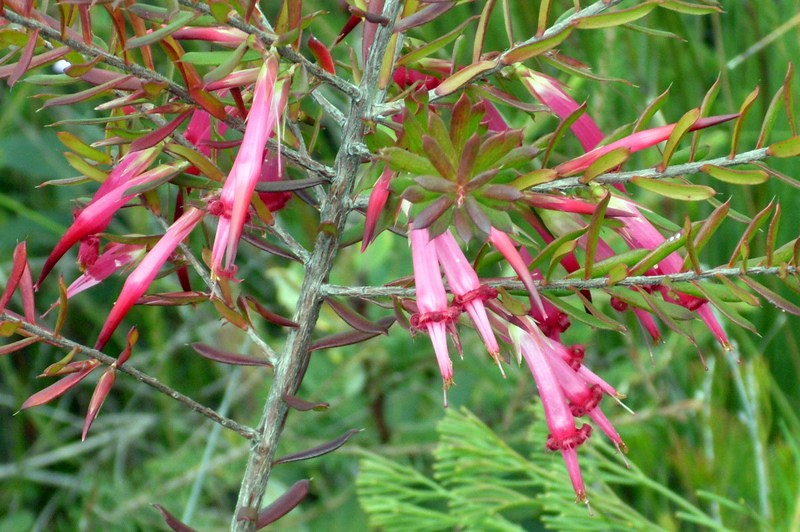
- In Ku-ring-gai Chase National Park, Australia

Scientific classification
- Kingdom: Plantae
- Clade: Embryophytes
- Clade: Tracheophytes
- Clade: Spermatophytes
- Clade: Angiosperms
- Clade: Eudicots
- Clade: Asterids
- Order: Ericales
- Family: Ericaceae
- Genus: Styphelia
- Species: S. tubiflora

Binomial name
- Styphelia tubiflora Sm.

= Styphelia tubiflora =

Species of shrub

Styphelia tubiflora, commonly known as red five-corners, is a species of flowering plant in the heath family Ericaceae and is endemic to eastern New South Wales. It is an erect to spreading shrub with oblong to egg-shaped leaves with the narrower end towards the base, and usually red, tube-shaped flowers.

== Description ==
Styphelia tubiflora is an erect to spreading shrub that typically grows to a height of 20–90 cm (7.9–35.4 in) and has branchlets with soft hairs. Its leaves are oblong or egg-shaped with the narrower end towards the base, 7–24 mm (0.28–0.94 in) long and 1.5–3.3 mm (0.059–0.130 in) long on a petiole 0.4–0.6 mm (0.016–0.024 in) long. The tip of the leaf narrows and the upper surface is often rough to the touch.

The flowers are arranged singly in leaf axils and are nearly sessile or on a very short peduncle, usually red, sometimes cream-coloured or pale yellowish-green. There are bracteoles 2.6–4.0 mm (0.10–0.16 in) long at the base of the flowers and the sepals are 8.4–11.4 mm (0.33–0.45 in) long. The petals are joined at the base, forming a tube 14.6–25 mm (0.57–0.98 in) long with narrow lobes 11.5–14.0 mm (0.45–0.55 in) long.

Flowering occurs from April to August, and the fruit is a dry, rounded capsule about 5 mm (0.20 in) long with a tiny "skirt" around one end.

== Taxonomy ==
Styphelia tubiflora was first formally described in 1795 by James Edward Smith in his A Specimen of the Botany of New Holland from specimens collected by John White. The specific epithet (tubiflora) means "tubular-flowered". Smith described the plant as having "transcendent elegance", and noted its resemblance to "the favourite Erica tubiflora" (now known as Erica curviflora var. curviflora).

== Distribution and habitat ==
Red five-corners grows on ridges and hillsides in woodland, forest and heath and is widespread between Sydney, the Blue Mountains and Jervis Bay.
