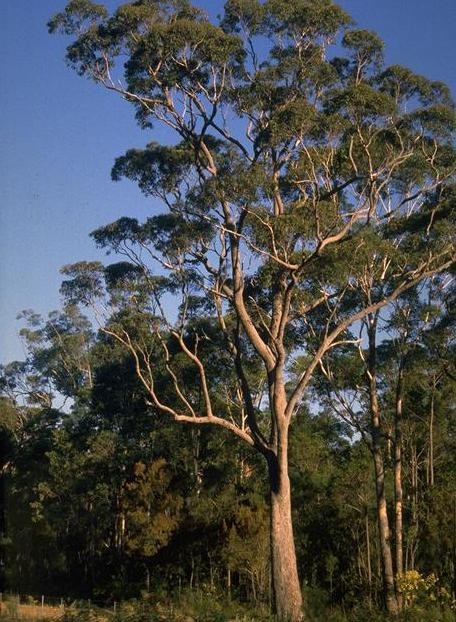

Conservation status
- Near Threatened (IUCN 3.1)

Scientific classification
- Kingdom: Plantae
- Clade: Tracheophytes
- Clade: Angiosperms
- Clade: Eudicots
- Clade: Rosids
- Order: Myrtales
- Family: Myrtaceae
- Genus: Corymbia
- Species: C. gummifera

Binomial name
- Corymbia gummifera (Gaertn.) K.D.Hill & L.A.S.Johnson

Synonyms
- Synonyms: Eucalyptus corymbosa Sm.; Eucalyptus corymbosa Sm. var. corymbosa; Eucalyptus corymbosus Cav. orth. var.; Eucalyptus gummifera (Sol. ex Gaertn.) Hochr.; Eucalyptus gummifera (Sol. ex Gaertn.) Hochr. var. gummifera; Eucalyptus longifolia Maiden nom. inval., pro syn.; Eucalyptus oppositifolia Desf. nom. inval., nom. nud.; Eucalyptus purpurascens var. petiolaris DC.; Metrosideros gummifera Sol. ex Gaertn.

= Corymbia gummifera =

Red bloodwood

Species of plant

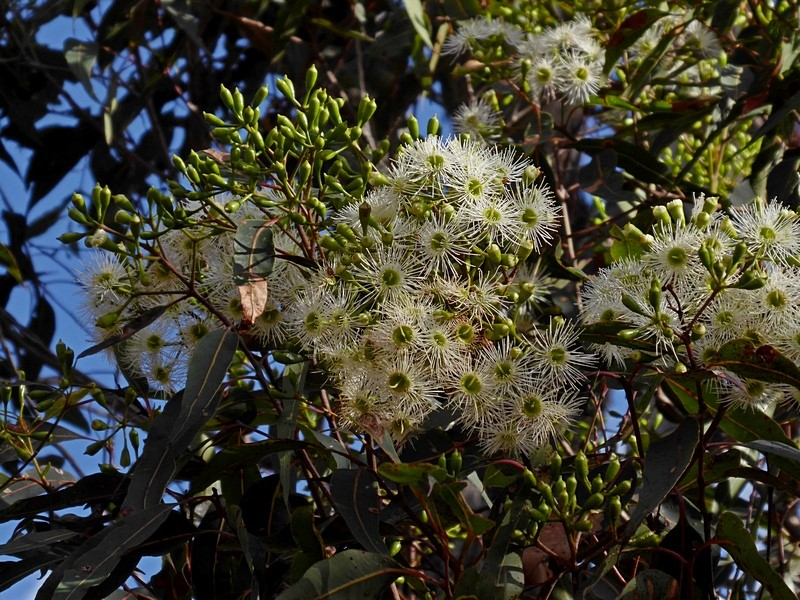
Buds and flowers

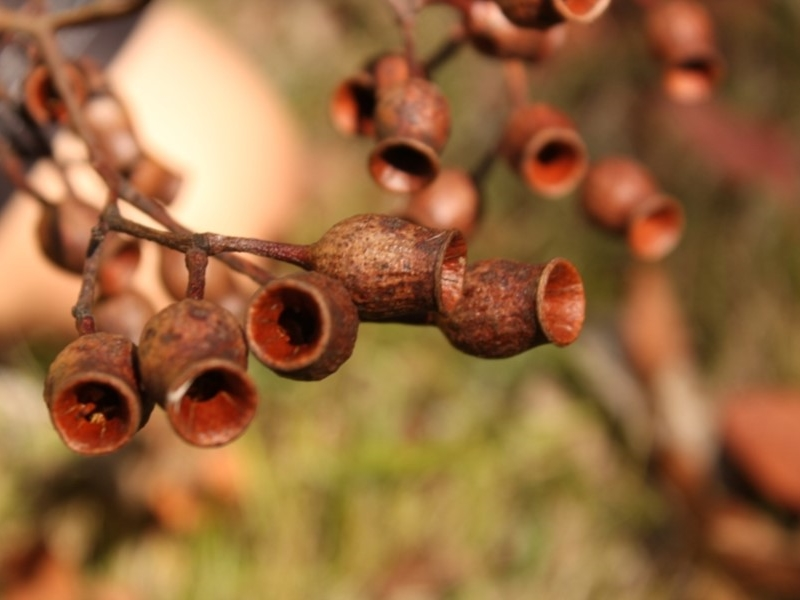
Fruit

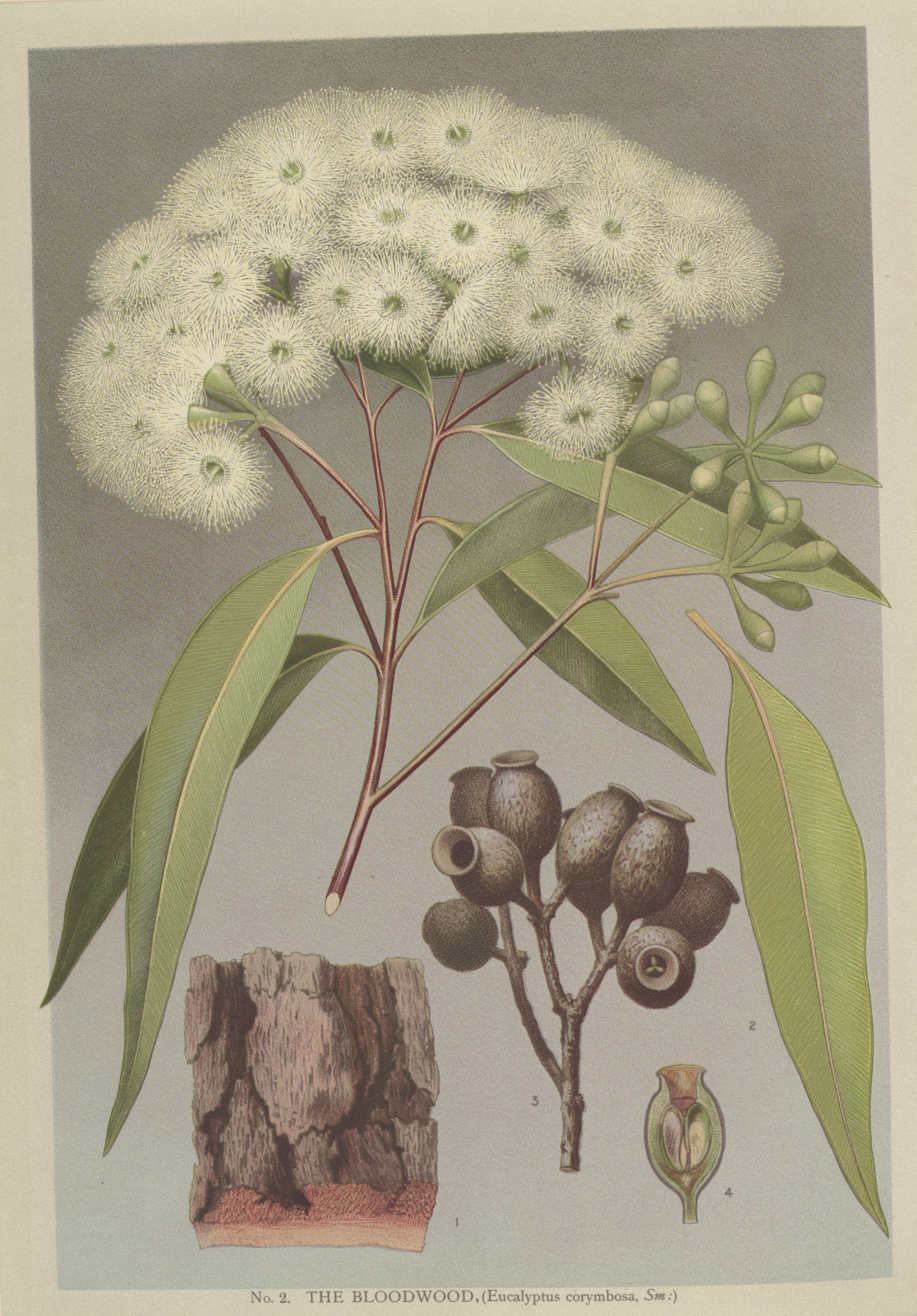
Illustration from a book by Joseph Maiden

Corymbia gummifera, commonly known as red bloodwood, is a species of tree, rarely a mallee, that is endemic to eastern Australia. It has rough, tessellated bark on the trunk and branches, lance-shaped adult leaves, flower buds in groups of seven, creamy white flowers and urn-shaped fruit.

== Description ==
Corymbia gummifera is a tree that typically grows to a height of 20–35 m (66–115 ft), rarely a mallee, and forms a lignotuber. These mallee lignotubers are not thick; only 10–20 cm (3.9–7.9 in) top to bottom, but up to 11 m (36 ft) wide. Young plants and coppice regrowth have leaves that are paler on the lower surface, egg-shaped to lance-shaped, 90–165 mm (3.5–6.5 in) long and 30–52 mm (1.2–2.0 in) wide, and petiolate. Juvenile leaves are opposite on the stem for a few pairs, then disjunct. Adult leaves are glossy dark green, paler on the lower surface, lance-shaped, 55–160 mm (2.2–6.3 in) long and 15–50 mm (0.6–2.0 in) wide, tapering to a petiole 8–23 mm (0.3–0.9 in) long. The flower buds are arranged as corymbs on the ends of branchlets on a branched peduncle 17–33 mm (0.7–1.3 in) long, each branch of the peduncle with seven buds on pedicels 2–15 mm (0.08–0.59 in) long. Mature buds are oval to pear-shaped, 8–12 mm (0.31–0.47 in) long and 4–6 mm (0.16–0.24 in) wide with a conical to rounded or slightly beaked operculum. Flowering occurs from December to June and the flowers are creamy white. The fruit is a woody urn-shaped capsule 12–22 mm (0.47–0.87 in) long and 9–18 mm (0.35–0.71 in) wide with the valves deeply enclosed in the fruit.

== Taxonomy ==
The red bloodwood was first formally described in 1788 by Joseph Gaertner, who gave it the name Metrosideros gummifera and published the description in his book De Fructibus et Seminibus Plantarum. The name is often given as Metrosideros gummifera Sol. ex Gaertn., but Gaertner did not ascribe the name to Solander.

The name Eucalyptus corymbosa, published by James Edward Smith in his 1795 A Specimen of the Botany of New Holland, is regarded as a synonym by the Australian Plant Census. Eucalyptus corymbosus, published in 1797 by Cavanilles in his book Icones et Descriptiones Plantarum is an orthographical variant. Eucalyptus oppositifolia, published in 1804 by Desfontaines is a nomen nudum because no description was provided. Eucalyptus purpurascens var. petiolaris, published in 1828 by de Candolle is regarded as a synonym. Eucalyptus longifolia, published in 1920 by Joseph Maiden is an invalid name because it had already been used for a different species.

In 1995 Ken Hill and Lawrie Johnson changed the name to Corymbia gummifera.

== Distribution and habitat ==
Corymbia gummifera mainly occurs on flats and low hills along the coast between the extreme eastern corner of Victoria and south-eastern Queensland. It grows best on moist, rich, loamy soil, but is also commonly found on poorer sandy soils.

== Uses ==
The heartwood of C. gummifera is very strong and durable, but has extensive gum lines. It is used for rough construction purposes, such as poles, sleepers, fencing and mining timbers.
Corymbia gummifera may be used as a rootstock, onto which the ornamental C. ficifolia is grafted.
