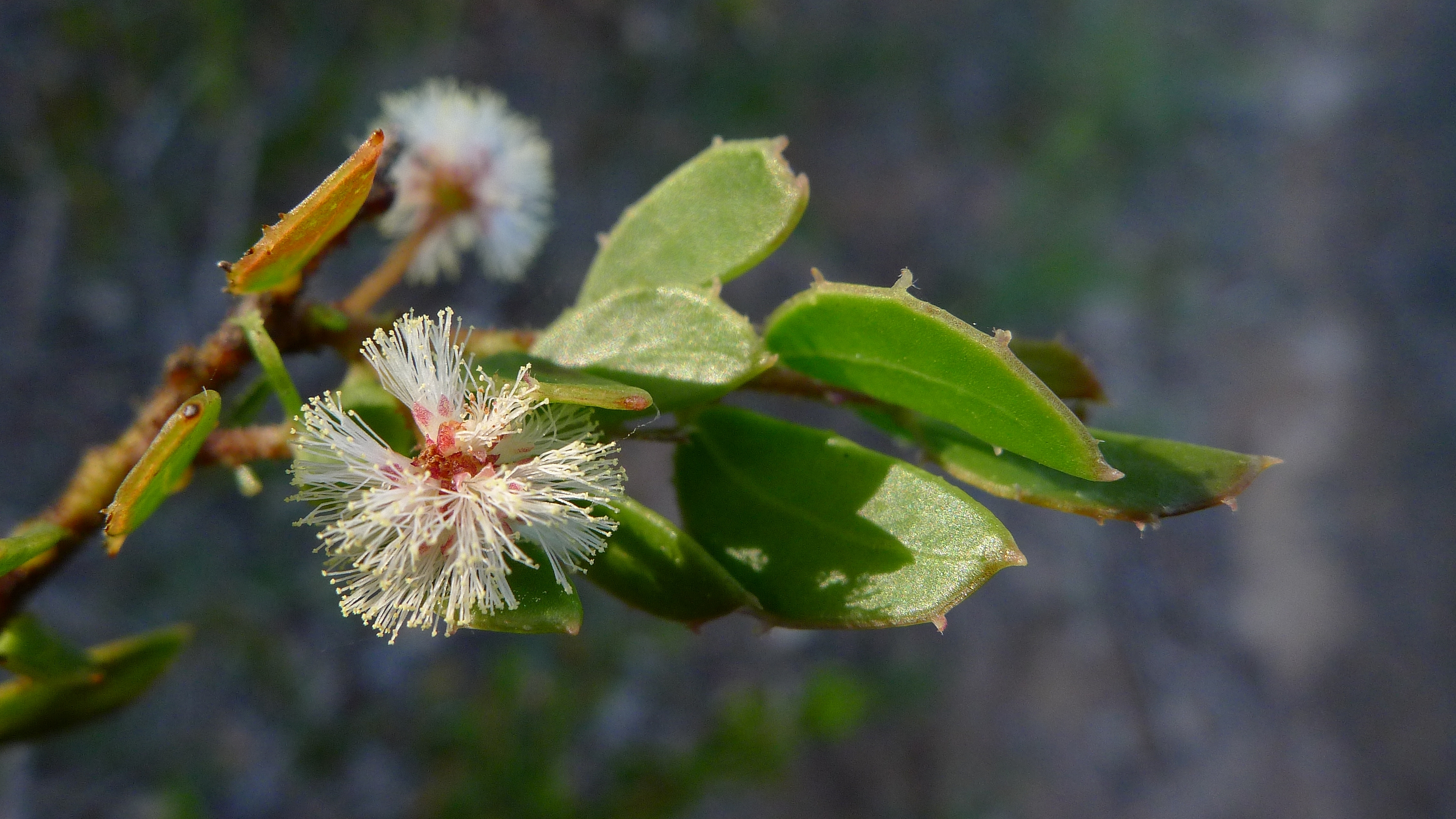
- In Heathcote National Park

Scientific classification
- Kingdom: Plantae
- Clade: Tracheophytes
- Clade: Angiosperms
- Clade: Eudicots
- Clade: Rosids
- Order: Fabales
- Family: Fabaceae
- Subfamily: Caesalpinioideae
- Clade: Mimosoid clade
- Genus: Acacia
- Species: A. hispidula

Binomial name
- Acacia hispidula (Sm.) Willd.
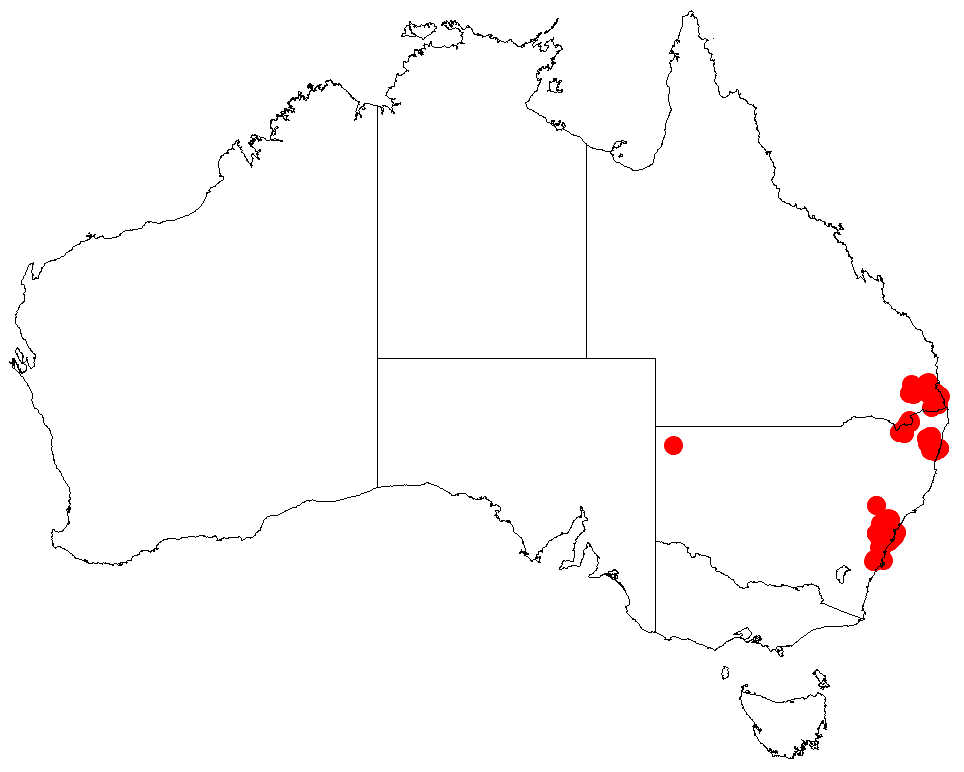
- Occurrence data from AVH

Synonyms
- Acacia hispidula A.Cunn. ex Hook. nom. illeg.; Mimosa hispidula Sm.; Racosperma hispidulum (Sm.) Pedley

= Acacia hispidula =

Little harsh acacia

Species of legume

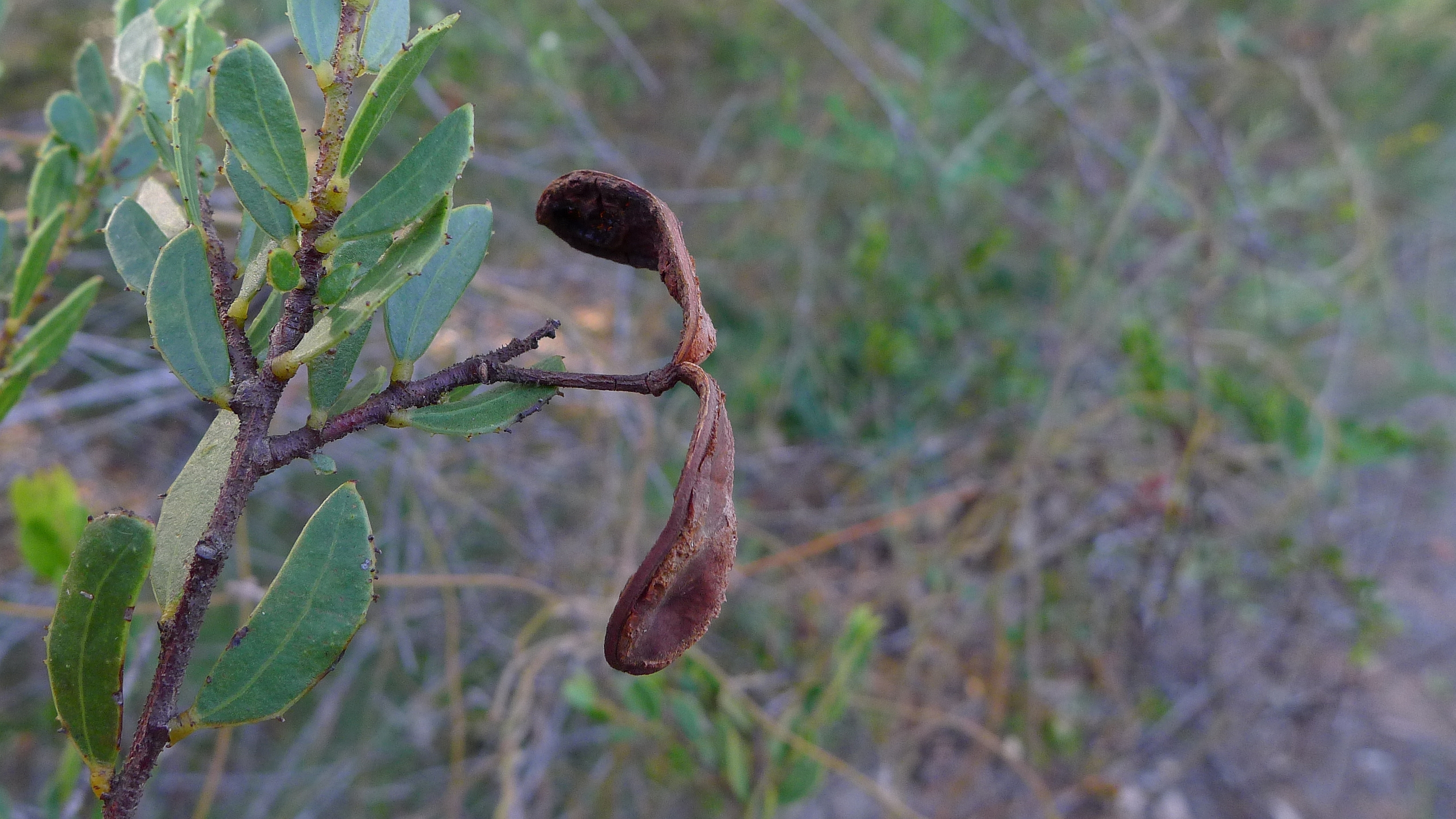
Seed pods

Acacia hispidula, known colloquially as little harsh acacia, rough-leaved acacia or rough hairy wattle, is a species of flowering plant in the family Fabaceae and is endemic to eastern Australia. It is an erect or spreading, open shrub, usually with asymmetric, narrowly oblong to narrowly elliptic phyllodes, spherical heads of pale yellow to almost white flowers and oblong to narrowly oblong, thickly leathery to woody pods.

== Description ==
Acacia hispidula is an erect or spreading, open shrub that typically grows to a height of up to 2 m (6 ft 7 in) and has rough, tuberculate branchlets with minute hairs. Its phyllodes are asymmetric, narrowly oblong to narrowly elliptic, sometimes lance-shaped, 10–30 mm (0.39–1.18 in) long and 3–10 mm (0.12–0.39 in) wide, with a prominent midrib. The flowers are borne in a spherical head in axils on a peduncle 5–12 mm (0.20–0.47 in) long, with 10 to 20 pale yellow to almost white flowers. Flowering occurs from January to April, and the pods are oblong to narrowly oblong, blackish, up to 45 mm (1.8 in) long and 7.5–10.5 mm (0.30–0.41 in), thickly leathery to almost woody, with one to three seeds. The seeds are oblong, 7.5–8.5 mm (0.30–0.33 in) long, about 4.5 mm (0.18 in) wide.

== Taxonomy ==
This species was first formally described in 1795 by James Edward Smith who gave it the name Mimosa hispidula in A Specimen of the Botany of New Holland. In 1806, Carl Ludwig Willdenow transferred the species to Acacia as A. hispida in Species Plantarum. The specific epithet (hispidula) refers to the branchlets and phyllode margins that have short hairs or tubercles.

== Distribution and habitat ==
Rough-leaved acacia has a disjunct distribution from the Sydney area and further north from Coffs Harbour and inland to Torrington to the border with Queensland and as north as far as Crows Nest and Brisbane, where it grows in Eucalyptus woodland in shallow soils over granite and sandstone.

== See also ==
- List of Acacia species
