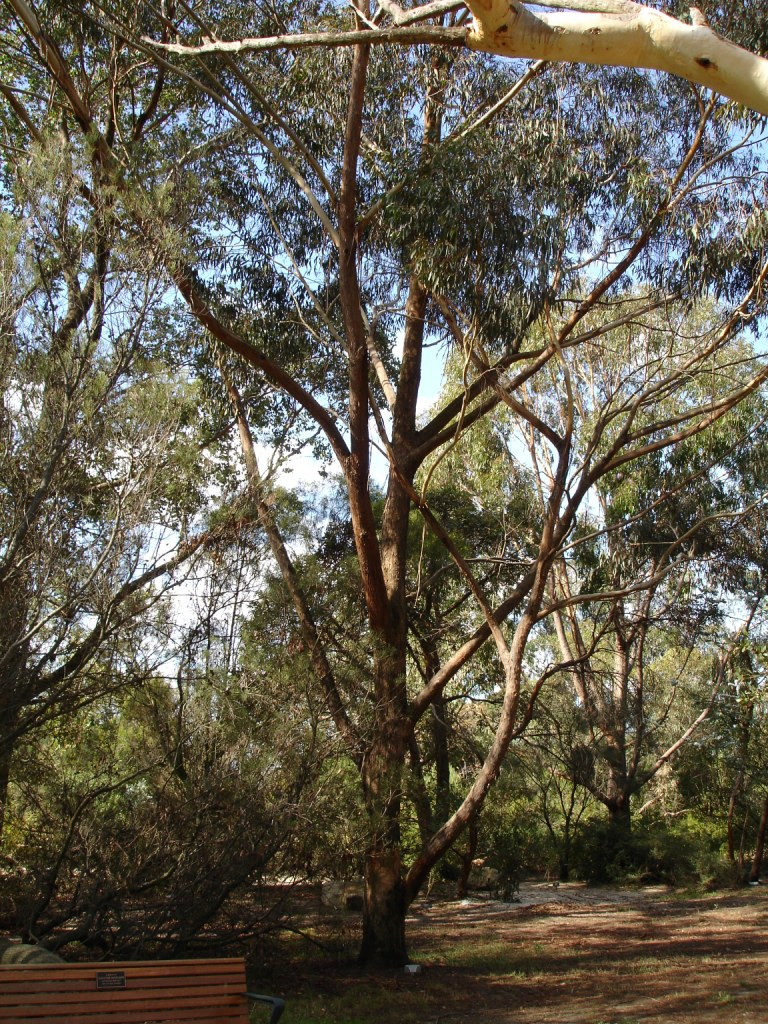
- Eucalyptus piperita in Maranoa Gardens

Conservation status
- Least Concern (IUCN 3.1)

Scientific classification
- Kingdom: Plantae
- Clade: Tracheophytes
- Clade: Angiosperms
- Clade: Eudicots
- Clade: Rosids
- Order: Myrtales
- Family: Myrtaceae
- Genus: Eucalyptus
- Species: E. piperita

Binomial name
- Eucalyptus piperita Sm.
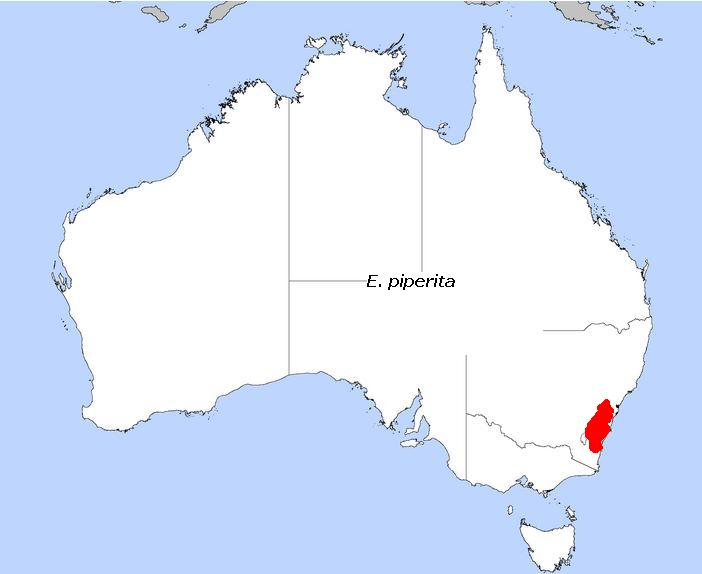
- E. piperita, field distribution

Synonyms
- Synonyms: Eucalyptus aromatica (Salisb.) Domin; Eucalyptus bottii Blakely; Eucalyptus piperita Sm. subsp. piperita; Eucalyptus piperita subsp. urceolaris (Maiden & Blakely) L.A.S.Johnson & Blaxell; Eucalyptus piperita var. laxiflora Benth.; Eucalyptus piperita Sm. var. piperita; Eucalyptus urceolaris Maiden & Blakely; Metrosideros aromatica Salisb.

= Eucalyptus piperita =

Sydney peppermint

Species of eucalyptus

Eucalyptus piperita, commonly known as Sydney peppermint and urn-fruited peppermint, is a small to medium forest tree native to New South Wales, Australia.

== Description ==
It has grey, rough and finely fibrous bark on its trunk, with smooth, white branches. Adult leaves are dull, blue-green and often oblique. Bright yellow-green flowers are borne in clusters of seven or more in late spring to mid summer. Fruit is urceolate (urn shaped) to barrel shaped, especially on the sides of valleys.

== Taxonomy and naming ==
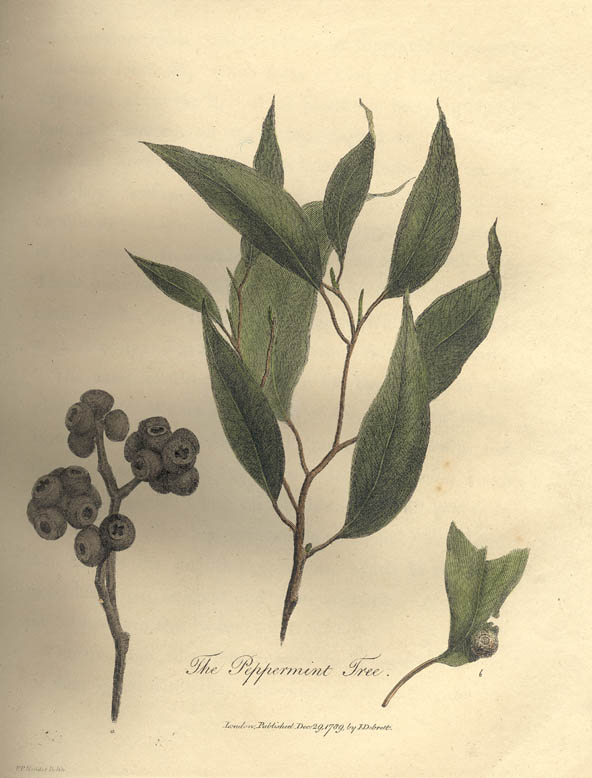
Plate 23 of John White's Journal of a Voyage to New South Wales, showing leaves and fruit of E. piperita (Only the centre and right images portray E. piperita; the fruit on the left was later shown to be E. capitellata.)

Specimens of E. piperita were first collected by First Fleet surgeon and naturalist John White, and published by James Edward Smith in his appendix to White's 1790 Journal of a Voyage to New South Wales. Smith gave it the specific epithet piperita because its odour of its essential oil was so similar to that of Mentha × piperita, the peppermint. White's Voyage also featured a plate showing the plant's leaves and old fruit, but no flowers.

Smith's description was republished in his 1793 A Specimen of the Botany of New Holland, but this did not stop Richard Anthony Salisbury from publishing about the same plant as Metrosideros aromatica in 1796.

== Distribution and habitat ==
Sydney peppermint grows in the tablelands and coastal areas of central and southern New South Wales, especially on the sides of valleys.

== Uses ==
The volatile leaf oil of E. piperita has been used in stomach upsets.

E. piperita 'type' has a fresh weight oil yield of 2.25% containing piperitone (40–50%) and phellandrene.

Australian botanist, Joseph Maiden, was of the opinion that Dennis Considen, a surgeon on the First Fleet deserves credit for being the first person to recognize the medicinal value of Eucalyptus oil extracted from E. piperita found growing on the shores of Port Jackson in 1788. This view is based on a letter Considen wrote in November 1788 to an English colleague, Dr Anthony Hamilton, saying that "... we have a large peppermint tree which is equal if not superior to our English peppermint. I have sent you a specimen of it if there is any merit in applying these and many other simples[sic] to the benefit of the poor wretches here, I certainly claim it, being the first who discovered and recommended them". Considen dispatched an oil sample for further evaluation in England on the return voyage of the Golden Grove in 1788. John White, Surgeon General to the Colony, is also credited with the discovery, in documenting the matter and organizing oil samples to be sent back to England. The surgeons initially based their assumptions of the medicinal properties of E. piperita from the similarity of its fragrance to English peppermint.

== See also ==
- List of Eucalyptus species
