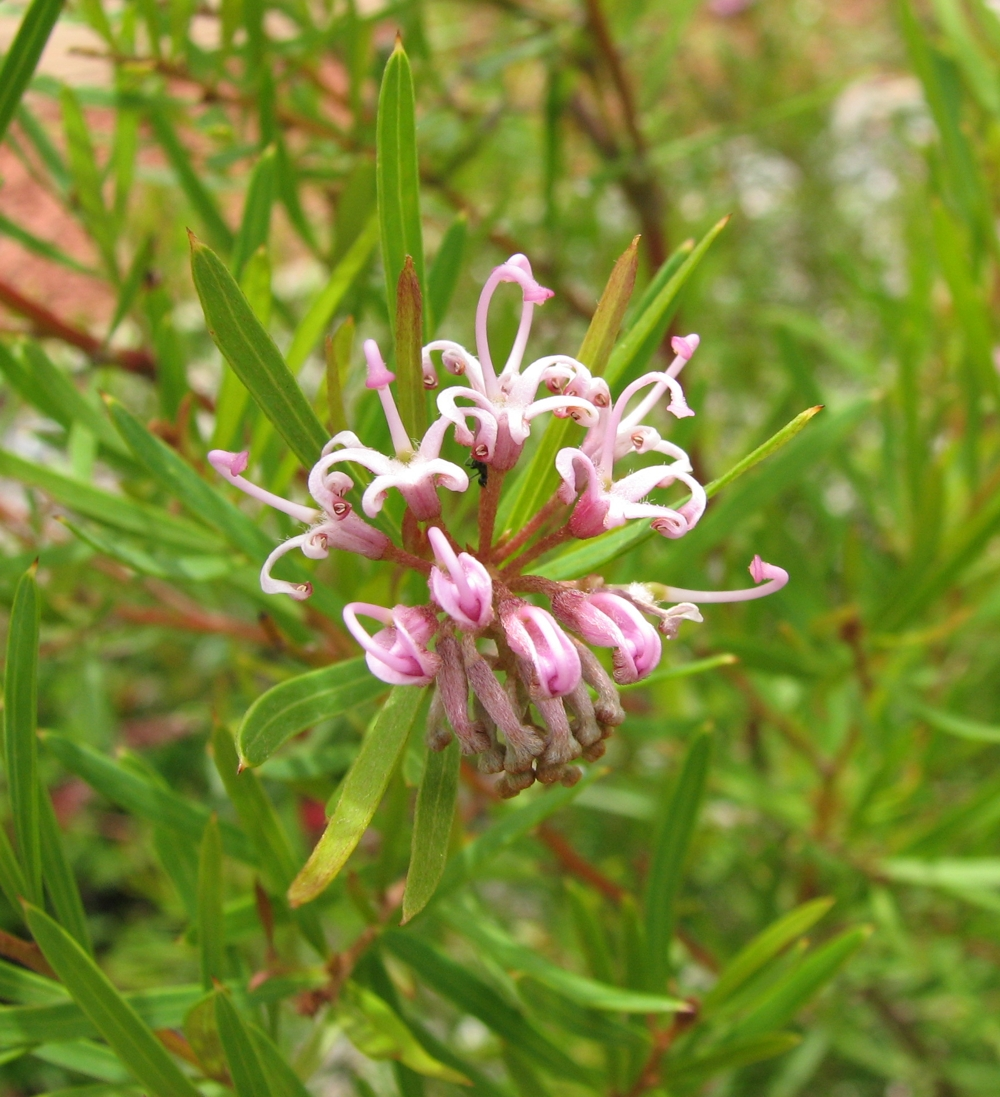

Conservation status
- Least Concern (IUCN 3.1)

Scientific classification
- Kingdom: Plantae
- Clade: Tracheophytes
- Clade: Angiosperms
- Clade: Eudicots
- Order: Proteales
- Family: Proteaceae
- Genus: Grevillea
- Species: G. sericea

Binomial name
- Grevillea sericea (Sm.) R.Br.

Synonyms
- Embothrium sericeum Sm.; Embothrium sericeum var. minor Sm.; Lysanthe sericea (Sm.) Knight

= Grevillea sericea =

Species of shrub endemic to New South Wales, Australia

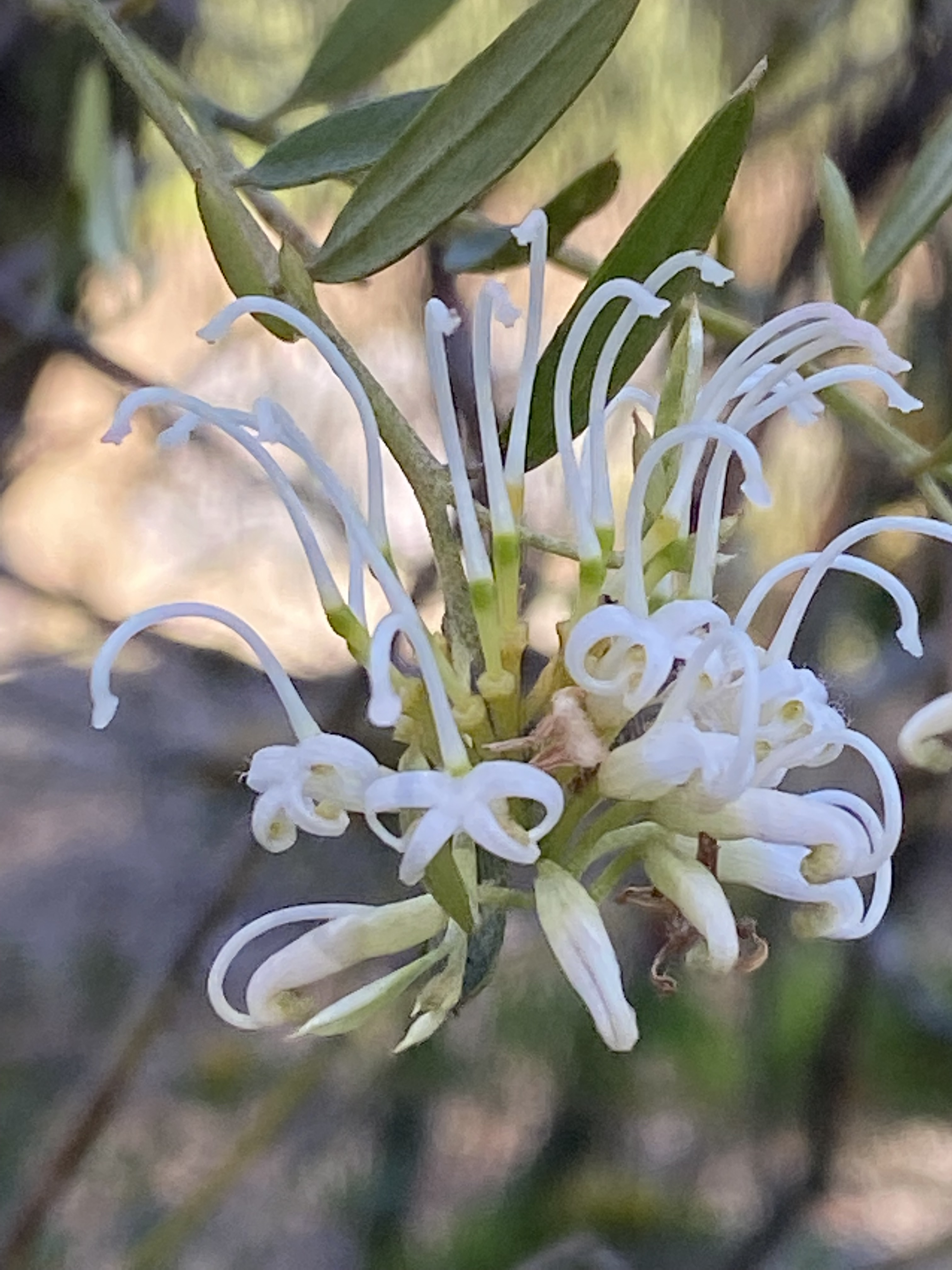
White flowered form

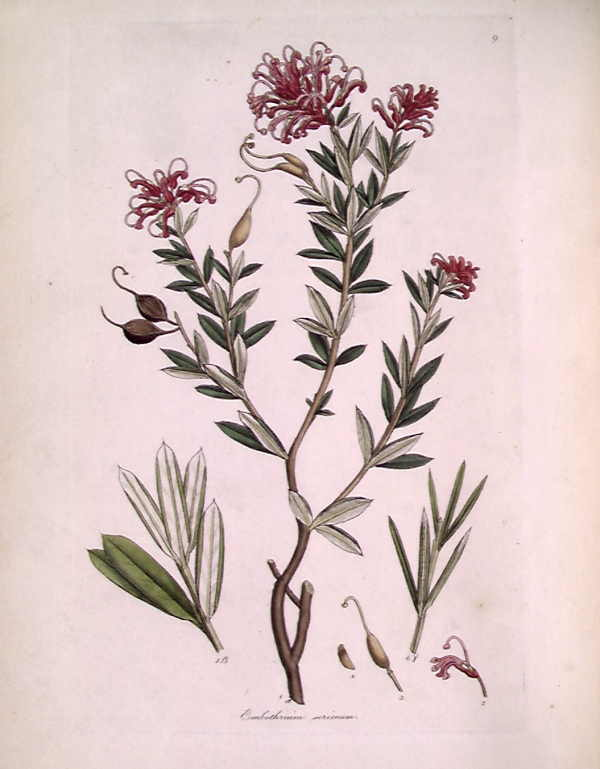
Illustration of Embrothium sericeum in A Specimen of the Botany of New Holland

Grevillea sericea, commonly known as the pink spider flower, is a species of flowering plant in the family Proteaceae and is endemic to New South Wales. It is a shrub with elliptic to lance-shaped leaves with the narrower end towards the base, and clusters of usually pink flowers arranged on one side of a flowering rachis.

== Description ==
Grevillea sericea is a shrub that typically grows to a height of 0.5–2 m (1 ft 8 in – 6 ft 7 in) with angular, ridged, silky-hairy branchlets. The leaves are 25–120 mm (0.98–4.72 in) long and 2–9 mm (0.079–0.354 in) wide, the size and shape depending on subspecies. The flowers are pink, deep purplish pink, rarely white or reddish, and arranged in clusters, more or less on one side of a rachis 15–60 mm (0.59–2.36 in) long, the pistil 14–19 mm (0.55–0.75 in) long. Flowering mainly occurs from August to December, and the fruit is a glabrous, narrowly oval to elliptic follicle 9–16 mm (0.35–0.63 in) long.

== Taxonomy ==
This species was first formally described in 1794 by James Edward Smith who gave it the name Embothrium sericeum in his book, A Specimen of the Botany of New Holland. In 1810, Robert Brown transferred it into Grevillea as G. sericea in Transactions of the Linnean Society of London.

In 1994, Peter M. Olde and Neil R. Marriott described two subspecies of G. sericea in The Grevillea Book, and the names are accepted by the Australian Plant Census:

- Grevillea sericea subsp. riparia (R.Br.) Olde & Marriott has linear leaves 60–120 mm (2.4–4.7 in) long, 1–3 mm (0.039–0.118 in) wide, and purplish pink flowers usually amongst the leaves.
- Grevillea sericea (Sm.) R.Br. subsp. sericea has egg-shaped leaves with the narrower end towards the base, to elliptic or narrowly elliptic leaves, usually less than 30 mm (1.2 in) long, 3–9 mm (0.12–0.35 in) wide, and deep to pale pink or white flowers usually mostly above the foliage.

== Distribution and habitat ==
Pink spider flower is widespread in New South Wales, and grows in woodland and open forest from near Toronto and Wyee south to near Heathcote, and inland to near Mudgee. Subspecies riparia has a more restricted distribution, growing near permanent streams mainly near the escarpment of the Blue Mountains, along the Grose and Colo Rivers and Glenbrook Creek.

== Use in horticulture ==
This species is commonly cultivated as an ornamental shrub for its compact, bushy habit and prolific, numerous flowers which occur in various shades of pink and white. The flowers are attractive to native bees and European honey bees. It grows best in full sun to semi-shade on well-drained, slightly acidic sandy loam soils in a warm temperate climate. It is tolerant of drought and mild frost.

It can be propagated through cuttings or germinated from seed. The cultivar 'Collaroy Plateau' is a hybrid of G. sericea ssp. sericea and G. speciosa.
