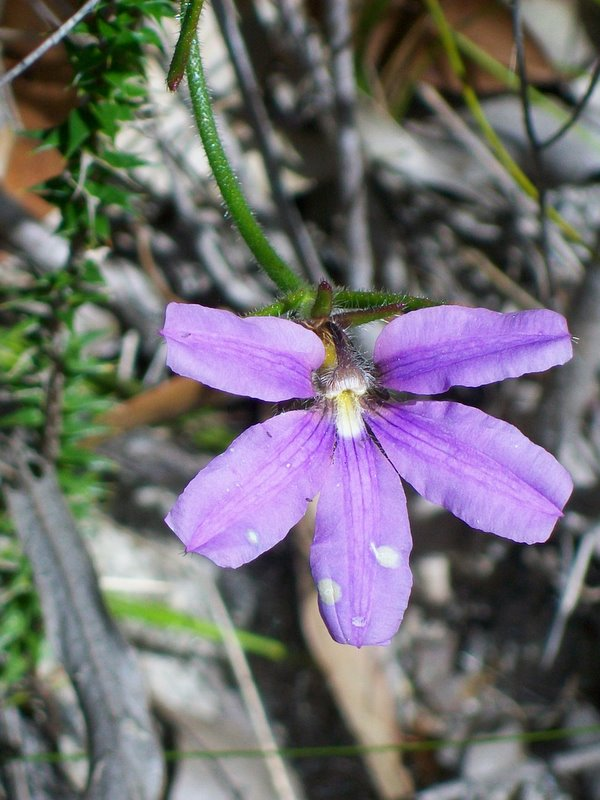
- Purple fan-flower at Ku-ring-gai Chase National Park, Australia

Scientific classification
- Kingdom: Plantae
- Clade: Tracheophytes
- Clade: Angiosperms
- Clade: Eudicots
- Clade: Asterids
- Order: Asterales
- Family: Goodeniaceae
- Genus: Scaevola
- Species: S. ramosissima

Binomial name
- Scaevola ramosissima (Sm.) K.Krause
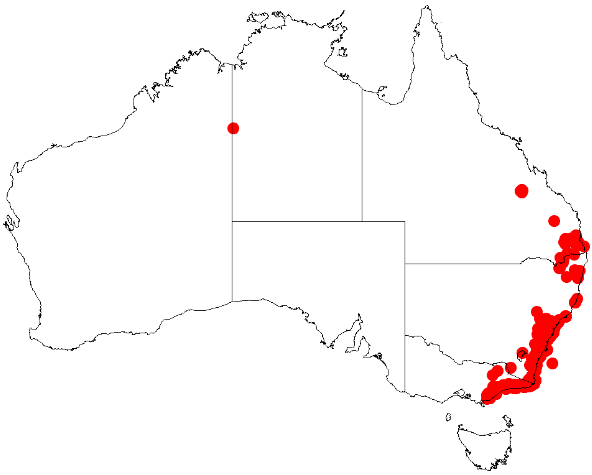
- Occurrence data from Australasian Virtual Herbarium

Synonyms
- _{Scaevola hispida Cav.}

= Scaevola ramosissima =

Purple fan-flower

Species of shrub

Scaevola ramosissima, commonly known as the purple fan-flower or snake flower is a flowering plant in the family Goodeniaceae and is endemic to south eastern Australia. It has wiry, horizontal branches and purple fan-shaped flowers.

== Description ==
Scaevola ramosissima is a scrambling herb up to 40 cm (16 in) high with horizontal stems that are covered in long, upright, stiff simple and glandular hairs. The leaves are linear to oblong-lance shaped, 2–10 cm (0.79–3.94 in) long, 2–10 mm (0.079–0.394 in) wide, mostly pointed, upper and lower surface hairy, margins smooth or toothed, usually curved under or upward and sessile. The flowers are on a pedicel up to 10 cm (3.9 in) long, bracteoles linear shaped and up to 2.5 cm (0.98 in) long. The corolla purple to pale violet, 1.5–2.5 cm (0.59–0.98 in) long, outer surface with stiff, upright hairs, bearded on the inside, wings 1–3 mm (0.039–0.118 in) wide. Flowering occurs from August to March and the fruit ellipsoid shaped, about 5–6 mm (0.20–0.24 in) long, wrinkled, longitudinal ribs and covered with stiff, upright hairs.

== Taxonomy and naming ==
Scaevola ramosissima was first formally described in 1912 by Kurt Krause and the description was published in Das Pflanzenreich. The specific epithet (ramosissima) means "much branched".

== Distribution and habitat ==
Purple fan-flower grows usually in sandy or gravelly soils in sclerophyll forests and heath from the Blackdown Tableland in Queensland, through New South Wales east of the Blue Mountains and Budawang Range, and in Victoria areas south of the ranges and east of Morwell.
