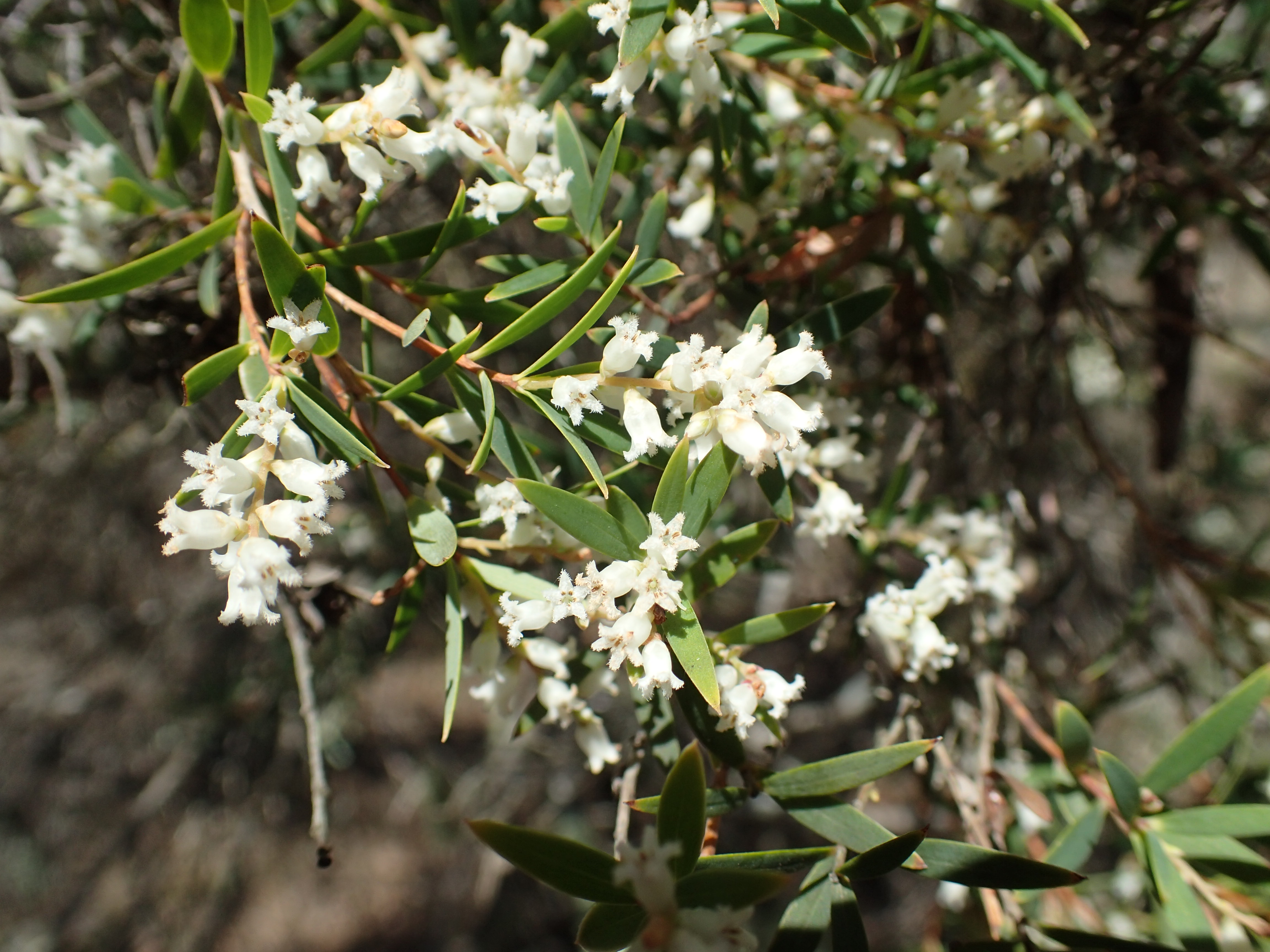
- Leucopogon affinis leaves and flowers

Scientific classification
- Kingdom: Plantae
- Clade: Tracheophytes
- Clade: Angiosperms
- Clade: Eudicots
- Clade: Asterids
- Order: Ericales
- Family: Ericaceae
- Genus: Leucopogon
- Species: L. affinis

Binomial name
- Leucopogon affinis R.Br.
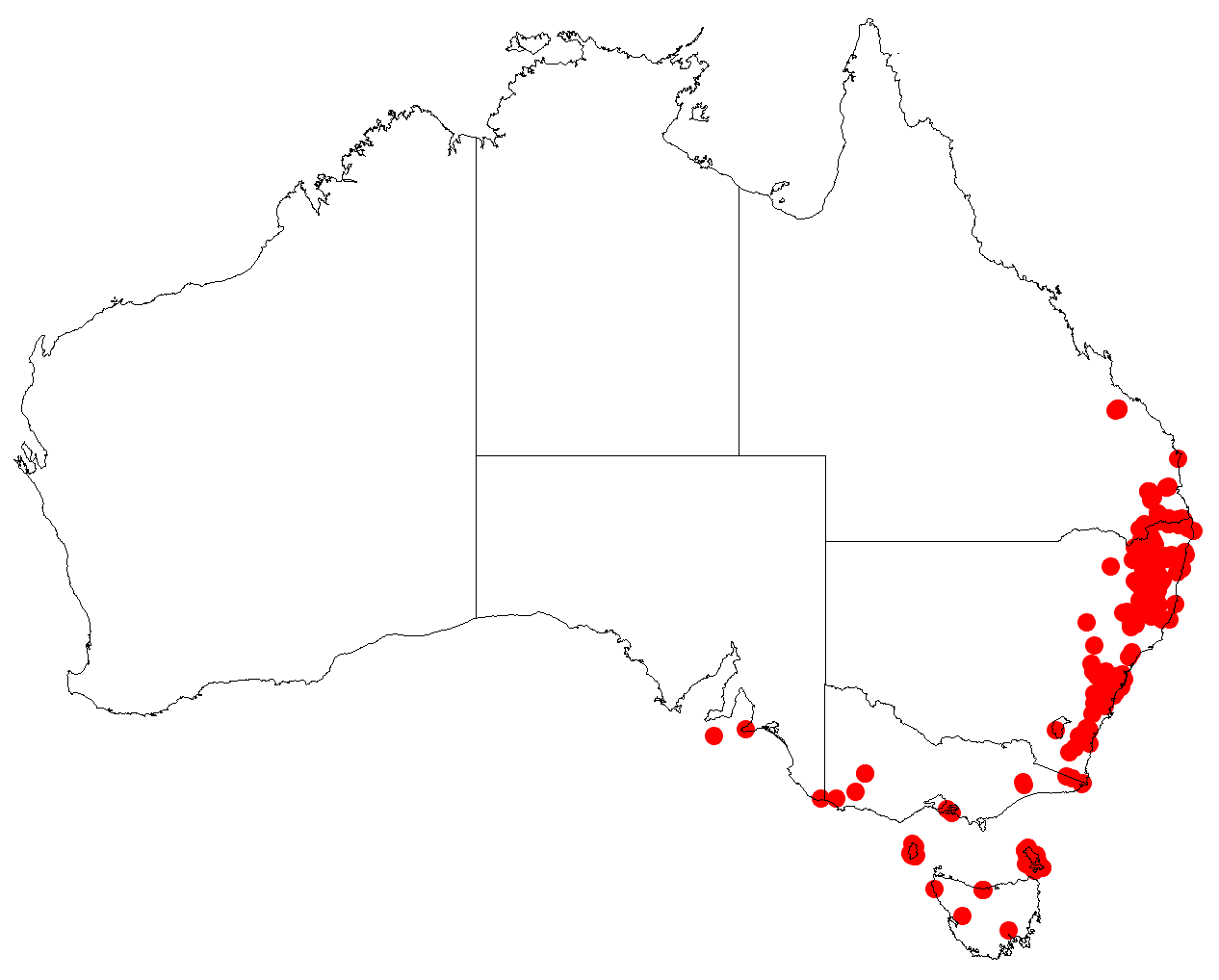
- Occurrence data from AVH

Synonyms
- Leucopogon cunninghami DC. orth. var.; Leucopogon cunninghamii R.Br. ex DC.; Leucopogon lanceolatus R.Br. nom. illeg., nom. superfl.; Styphelia affinis (R.Br.) Spreng.; Styphelia lanceolata Sm. nom. illeg., nom. superfl. p.p.; Leucopogon australis auct. non R.Br.; Styphelia australis auct. non (R.Br.) F.Muell.

= Leucopogon affinis =

Lance beard-heath

Species of plant

Leucopogon affinis, commonly known as lance beard-heath and formerly known as Leucopogon lanceolatus is a flowering plant in the heath family Ericaceae and is endemic to eastern Australia, including Tasmania and South Australia. It is an erect shrub with spikes of small white flowers in early spring, followed by orange-red fruit.

== Description ==
Leucopogon affinis is an erect, often bushy shrub which grows to a height of 0.7–3 m (2–10 ft), sometimes with its youngest branches having a covering of tiny hairs. Its leaves are lance-shaped, elliptic or egg-shaped, 6–50 mm (0.2–2 in) long, 1.3–8 mm (0.05–0.3 in) wide. They are almost stalkless, have a narrow base, a pointed tip, fine striations on the lower surface and the edges sometimes have fine teeth near the tip.

The flowers are arranged in spikes on the ends of the branches and in the upper leaf axils. The spikes are 3–39 mm (0.1–2 in) long and contain between 2 and 16 tube-shaped white flowers. The flower tube is 3–4 mm (0.1–0.2 in) long with 5 pointed lobes that are densely hairy inside. The base of the tube is surrounded by narrow, egg-shaped sepals that are 1–2 mm (0.04–0.08 in) long. Flowering occurs from August to October and is followed by glabrous, edible, oval-shaped, reddish-orange fruit about 3 mm (0.1 in) long.

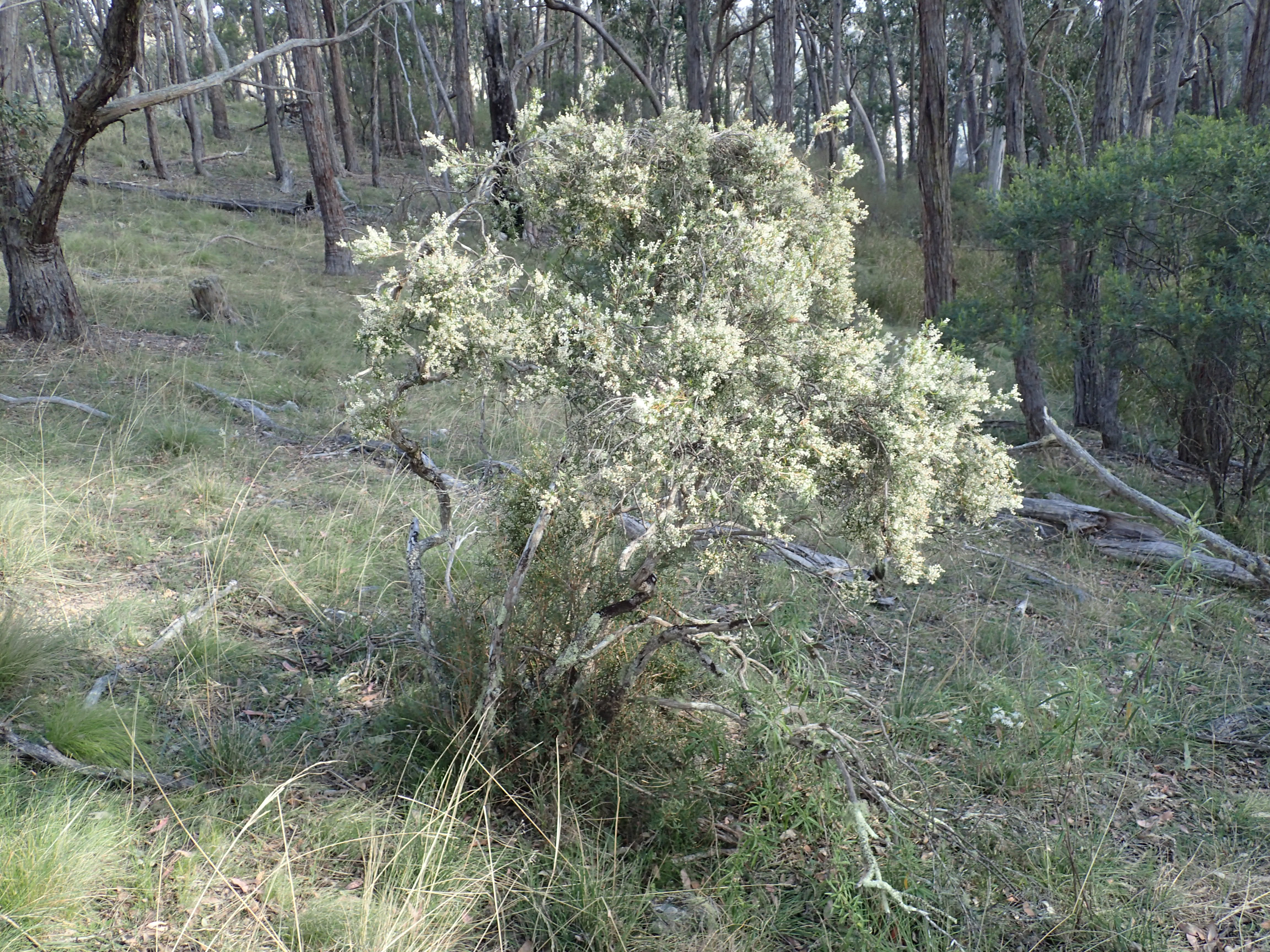
L. affinis growing near Wollomombi Falls

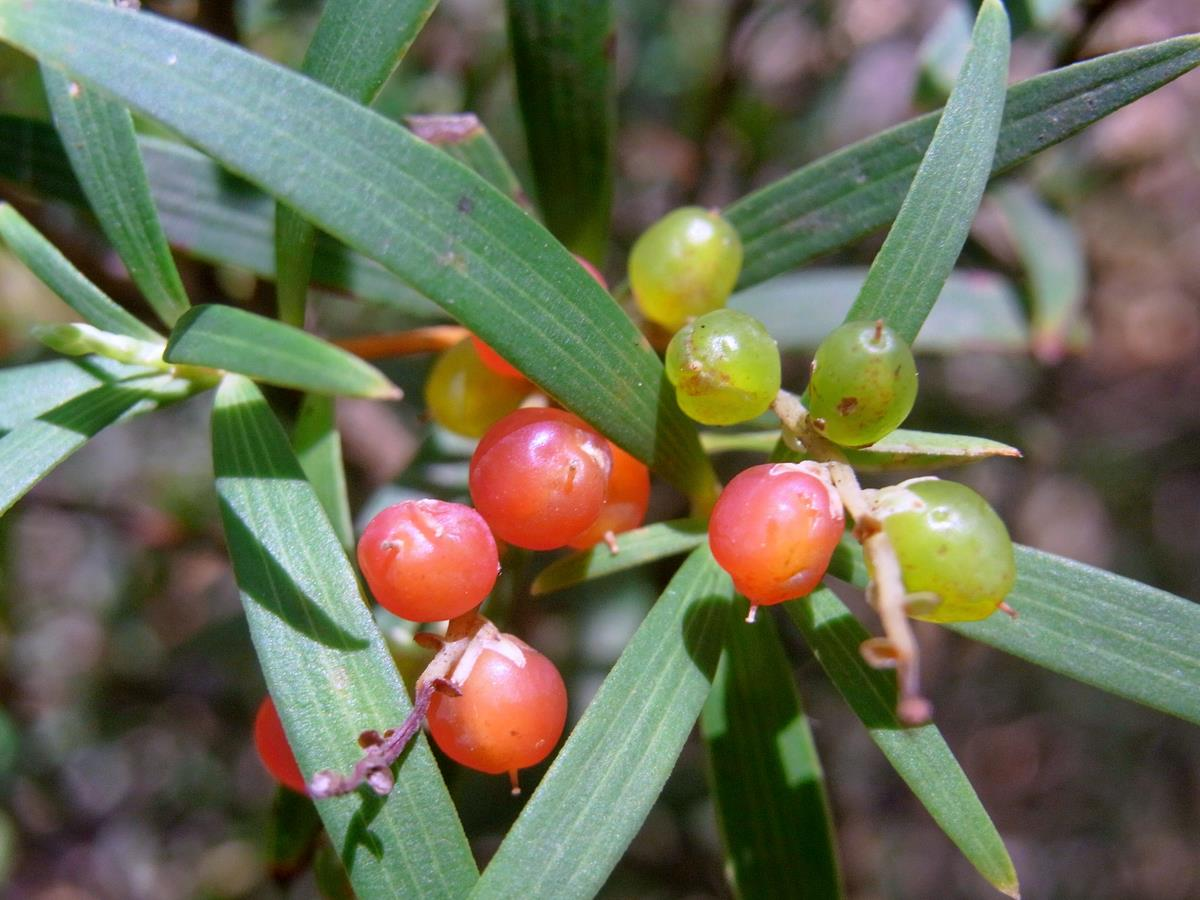
L. affinis fruit and leaves from Mount Imlay

== Taxonomy and naming ==
Leucopogon affinis was first formally described by Robert Brown in 1810 and the description was published in Prodromus Florae Novae Hollandiae. The specific epithet (affinis) is a Latin word meaning "related to", "neighboring" or "bordering".

The plant was formerly known as Leucopogon lanceolatus (Sm.) R.Br. but this is now recognised as a nomen illegitimum by the Australian Plant Census.

== Distribution and habitat ==
This leucopogon mainly grows in open forests and woodland, sometimes in moist gullies or in swampy areas, on a range of soils. It occurs in south-east Queensland, the coast and adjacent ranges of New South Wales, far south-eastern South Australia and on some of the islands in Bass Strait although not on the Tasmanian mainland.

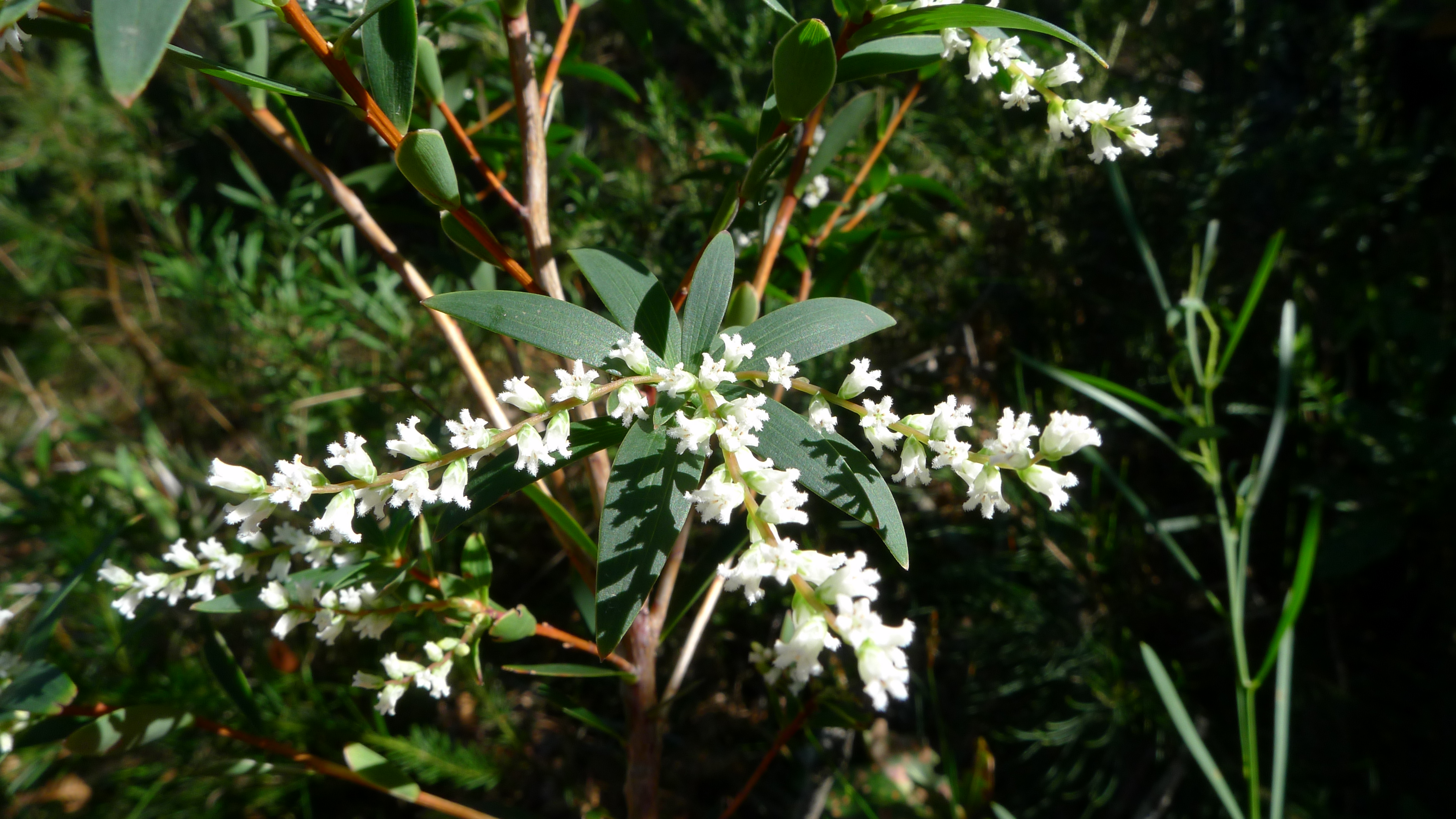
L. affinis in the Royal National Park

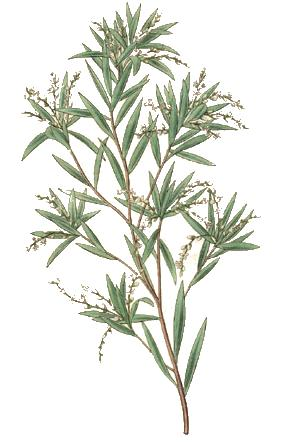
L. lanceolatus (nom. illeg.) from Curtis's Botanical Magazine
