= Eucalyptus oil =

Distilled oil from the leaf of Eucalyptus

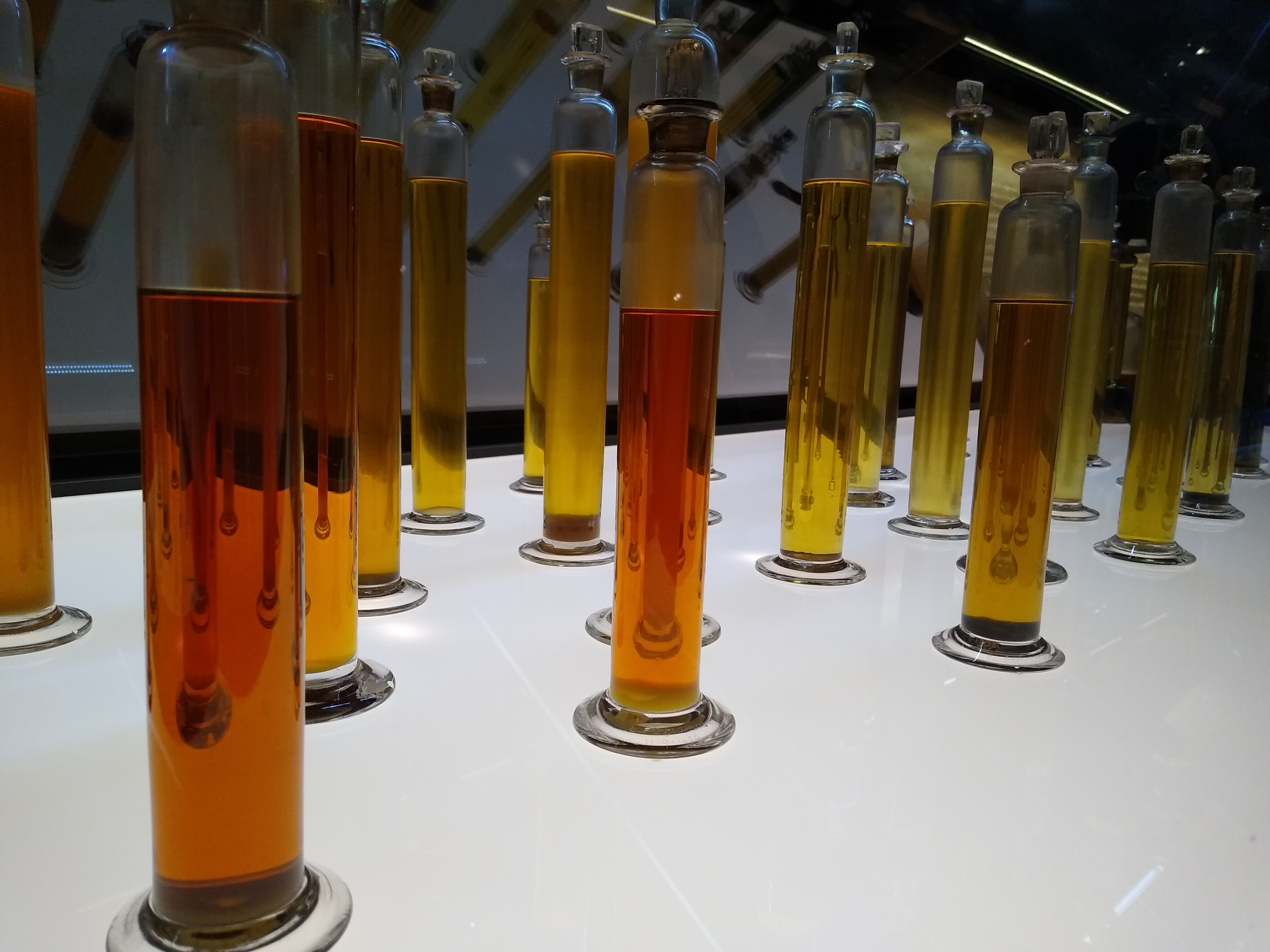
Eucalypt oils distilled in the early 20th century, on display at the Powerhouse Museum, Sydney

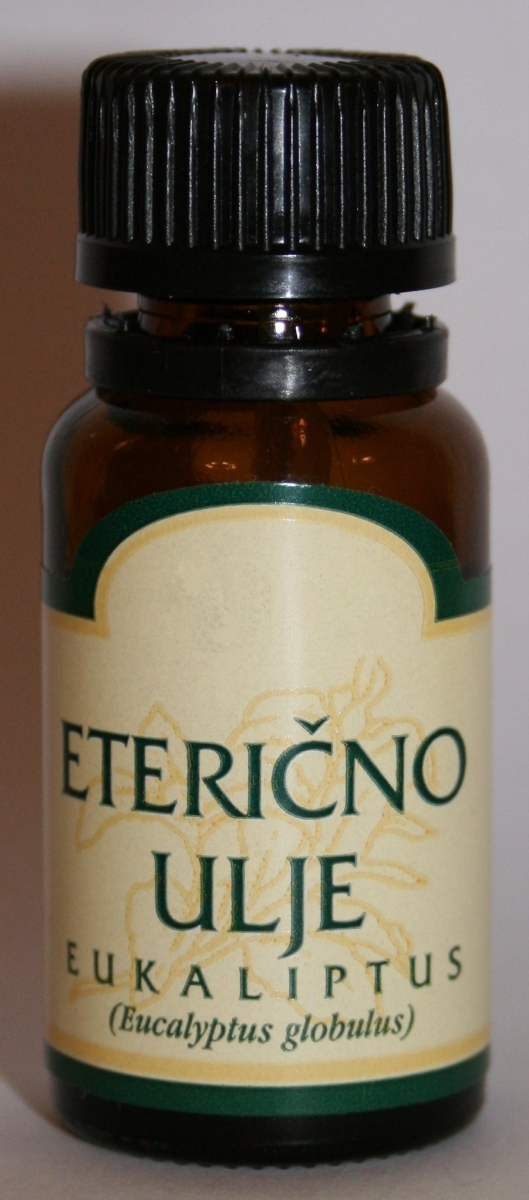
Eucalyptus oil for pharmaceutical use.

Eucalyptus oil is the generic name for distilled oil from the leaves of Eucalyptus, a genus of the plant family Myrtaceae, mostly native to Australia but cultivated worldwide. Eucalyptus oil has a history of wide application, as a pharmaceutical, antiseptic, repellent, flavouring and fragrance, as well as having industrial uses. The leaves of selected Eucalyptus species are steam distilled to extract eucalyptus oil.

== Types and production ==
In the trade, eucalyptus oils are categorized into three broad types according to their composition and main end-use: medicinal, perfumery and industrial. The most prevalent is the standard cineole-based "oil of eucalyptus", a colourless mobile liquid (which yellows with age), having a penetrating, camphoraceous, woody-sweet scent.

China produces about 75% of the world output, but most of that is derived from the cineole fractions of camphor laurel rather than being true eucalyptus oil. Significant producers of true eucalyptus include South Africa, Portugal, Spain, Brazil, Australia, Chile, and Eswatini.

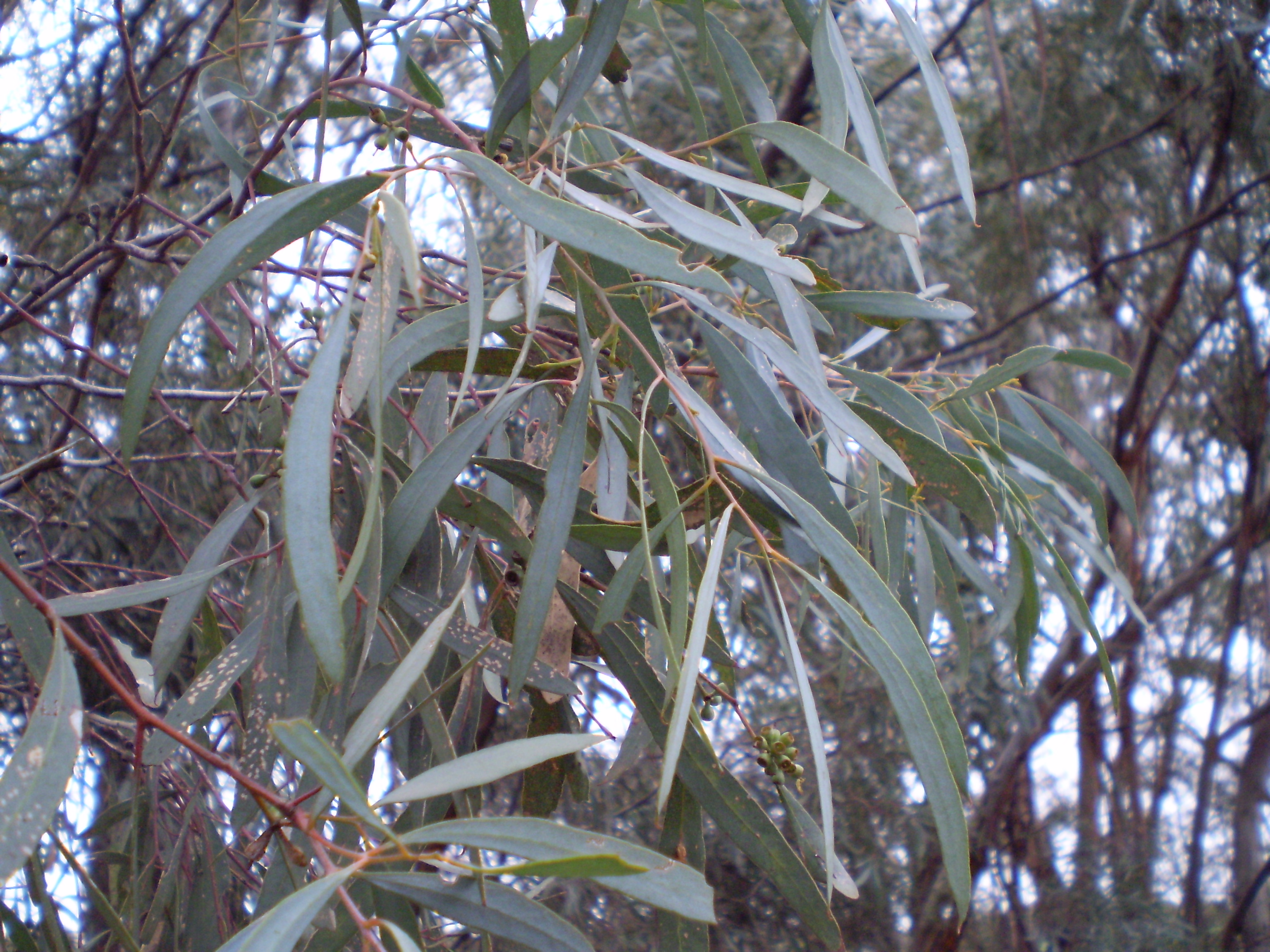
Eucalyptus polybractea or Blue-leaf Mallee, a species yielding high-quality eucalyptus oil

Global production is dominated by oil from Eucalyptus globulus. However, Eucalyptus kochii and Eucalyptus polybractea have the highest cineole content, ranging from 80 to 95%. The British Pharmacopoeia states that the oil must have a minimum cineole content of 70% if it is pharmaceutical grade. Rectification is used to bring lower grade oils up to the high cineole standard required. In 1991, global annual production was estimated at 3,000 tonnes for the medicinal eucalyptus oil, with another 1,500 tonnes being for the main perfumery oil, produced from Eucalyptus citriodora. The eucalyptus genus also produces non-cineole oils, including piperitone, phellandrene, citral, methyl cinnamate and geranyl acetate.

== Uses ==
=== Herbal medicine ===
Eucalyptus oil is a common ingredient in decongestant formulations. The European Medicines Agency Committee on Herbal Medicinal Products concluded that traditional medicines based on eucalyptus oil can be used for treating cough associated with the common cold, and to relieve symptoms of localized muscle pain.

=== Repellent and biopesticide ===
Cineole-based eucalyptus oil is used as an insect repellent and biopesticide. In the U.S., eucalyptus oil was first registered in 1948 as an insecticide and miticide.

=== Flavouring and fragrance ===
Cineole-based eucalyptus oil is used, at low levels (0.002%), as a flavouring in various products, including baked goods, confectionery, meat products and beverages. Eucalyptus oil has antimicrobial activity against a broad range of food-borne human pathogens and food spoilage microorganisms.

Non-cineole peppermint gum, strawberry gum and lemon ironbark are used as flavouring. Eucalyptus oil is also used as a fragrance component to impart a fresh and clean aroma in soaps, detergents, lotions, and perfumes. It is known for its pungent, intoxicating scent. Due to its cleansing properties, eucalyptus oil is found in mouthrinses to freshen breath.

=== Industrial ===
Research shows that cineole-based eucalyptus oil (5% of mixture) prevents the separation problem with ethanol and petrol fuel blends. Eucalyptus oil also has a respectable octane rating, and can be used as a fuel in its own right. However, production costs are currently too high for the oil to be economically viable as a fuel.

Phellandrene- and piperitone-based eucalyptus oils have been used in mining to separate sulfide minerals via flotation.

=== Cleaning ===
Eucalyptus oil is used in household cleaning applications. It is commonly used in commercial laundry products such as wool wash liquid. It is used as a solvent for removing grease and sticky residue.

== Safety and toxicity ==
If consumed internally at low dosage as a flavouring component or in pharmaceutical products at the recommended rate, cineole-based 'oil of eucalyptus' is safe for adults. However, systemic toxicity can result from ingestion or topical application at higher than recommended doses. In Australia, eucalyptus oil is one of the many essential oils that have been increasingly causing cases of poisoning, mostly of children. There were 2,049 reported cases in New South Wales between 2014 and 2018, accounting for 46.4% of essential oil poisoning incidents.

The probable lethal dose of pure eucalyptus oil for an adult is in the range of 0.05 mL to 0.5 mL/per kg of body weight. Because of their high body-surface-area-to-mass ratio, children are more vulnerable to poisons absorbed transdermally. Severe poisoning has occurred in children after ingestion of 4 mL to 5 mL of eucalyptus oil.

Eucalyptus oil has also been shown to be dangerous to domestic cats, causing an unstable gait, excessive drooling, and other symptoms of ill health.

The known primary toxin in eucalyptus oil is eucalyptol.

== History ==
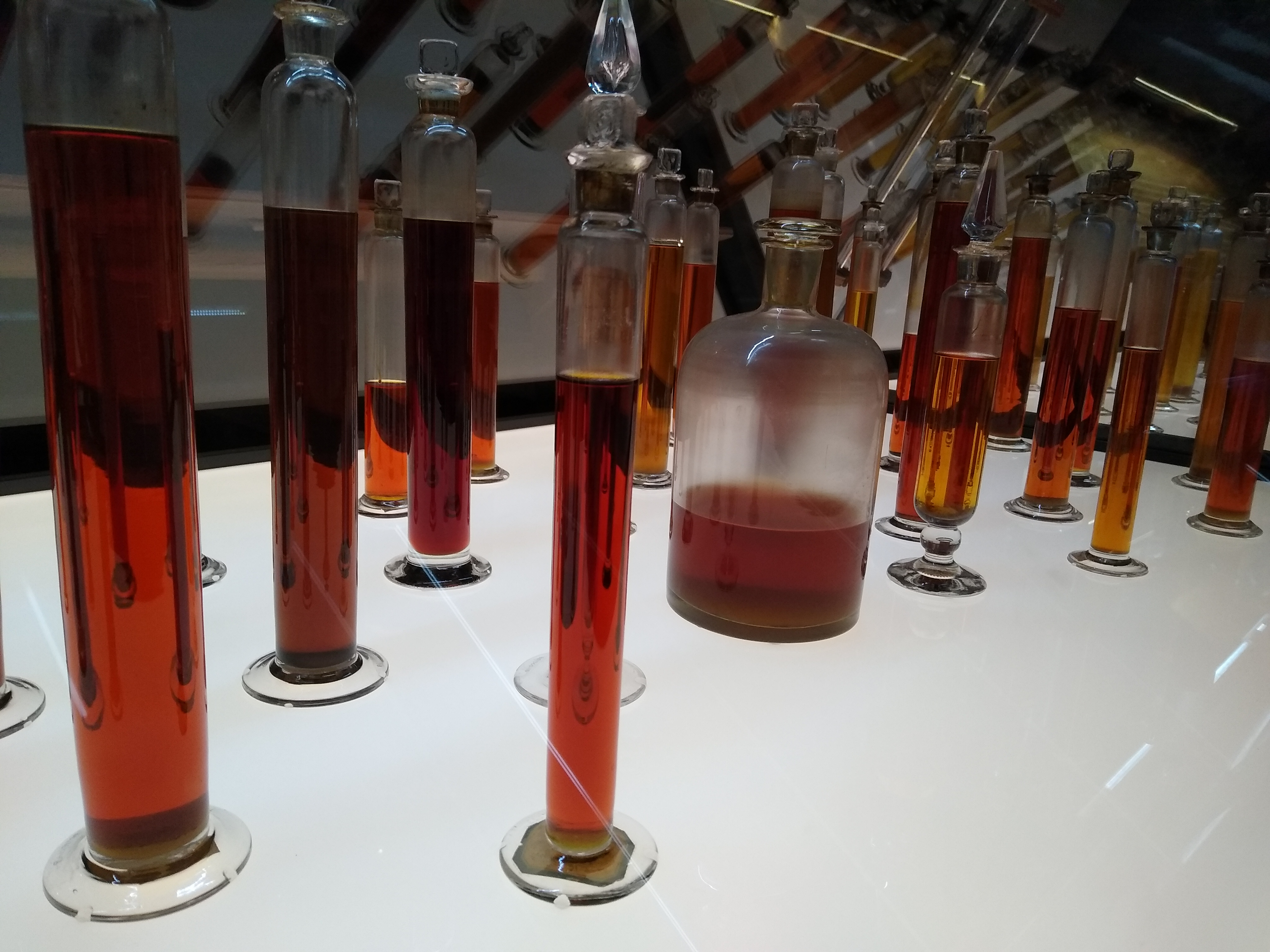
Eucalypt oils distilled in the early 20th century, on display at the Powerhouse Museum, Sydney

Aboriginal Australians use eucalyptus leaf infusions (which contain eucalyptus oil) as a traditional medicine for treating body pains, sinus congestion, fever, and colds.

In 1788, Dennis Considen and John White, surgeons on the First Fleet, distilled eucalyptus oil from Eucalyptus piperita, growing on the shores of Port Jackson, to treat convicts and marines. Eucalyptus oil was subsequently extracted by early colonists, but was not commercially exploited for some time.

Baron Ferdinand von Mueller, government botanist for the Colony of Victoria, promoted the qualities of Eucalyptus as a disinfectant in "fever districts" and also encouraged Joseph Bosisto, a Melbourne pharmacist, to investigate the commercial potential of the oil. Bosisto started the commercial eucalyptus oil industry in 1852 near Dandenong, Victoria, Australia, when he set up a distillation plant and extracted the essential oil from the cineole chemotype of Eucalyptus radiata. This resulted in the cineole chemotype becoming the generic 'oil of eucalyptus', and "Bosisto's Eucalyptus Oil" still survives as a brand.

French chemist, F. S. Cloez, identified and ascribed the name eucalyptol — also known as cineole — to the dominant portion of E. globulus oil. By the 1870s oil from Eucalyptus globulus, Tasmanian blue gum, was being exported worldwide and eventually dominated world trade, while other higher quality species were also being distilled to a lesser extent. Surgeons were using eucalyptus oil as an antiseptic during surgery by the 1880s.

Eucalyptus oil became an important industry in the box-ironbark forests of Victoria during the post gold-rush era of the 1870s. The oil was often described as Australia's natural wonder and was exported to a growing international market, mostly for medicinal purposes. Eucalyptus oil was in particularly big demand during the global influenza pandemic of 1918-19. A distillation plant was established by the Forests Commission Victoria at Wellsford State Forest near Bendigo in 1926. The Principal of the Victorian School of Forestry, Edwin James Semmens, undertook much of the pioneering chemistry into the composition of eucalyptus oil. His steam extraction kilns are in the museum at the school.

The Australian eucalyptus oil industry peaked in the 1940s, the main area of production being the central goldfields region of Victoria, particularly Inglewood; then the global establishment of eucalyptus plantations for timber resulted in increased volumes of eucalyptus oil as a plantation by-product. By the 1950s the cost of producing eucalyptus oil in Australia had increased so much that it could not compete against cheaper Spanish and Portuguese oils (being of lower cost due to their proximity to the European market). Non-Australian sources now dominate commercial eucalyptus oil supply, although Australia continues to produce high grade oils, mainly from blue mallee (E. polybractea) stands.

== Species utilised ==
Commercial cineole-based eucalyptus oils are produced from several species of Eucalyptus:

- Eucalyptus cneorifolia
- Eucalyptus dives
- Eucalyptus dumosa
- Eucalyptus globulus
- Eucalyptus goniocalyx
- Eucalyptus horistes
- Eucalyptus kochii
- Eucalyptus leucoxylon
- Eucalyptus oleosa
- Eucalyptus polybractea
- Eucalyptus radiata
- Eucalyptus sideroxylon
- Eucalyptus smithii
- Eucalyptus tereticornis
- Eucalyptus viridis

Non-cineole oil producing species:

- Eucalyptus dives - phellandrene variant
- Eucalyptus dives - piperitone variant
- Eucalyptus elata - piperitone variant
- Eucalyptus macarthurii - geranyl acetate
- Eucalyptus olida - methyl cinnamate
- Eucalyptus radiata - phellandrene variant
- Eucalyptus staigeriana - citral, limonene

The former lemon eucalyptus species Eucalyptus citriodora is now classified as Corymbia citriodora, which produces a citronellal-based oil.

== Compendial status ==
- British Pharmacopoeia

== See also ==
- Essential oil
- Olbas Oil, a combination of oils from Eucalyptus, peppermint, clove, juniper, cajuput and wintergreen used as a treatment for nasal congestion
- Eucalypts, woody plants belonging to three closely related genera: Eucalyptus, Corymbia and Angophora
