= Eucalyptus aenea =

Scientific classification
- Kingdom: Plantae
- Clade: Tracheophytes
- Clade: Angiosperms
- Clade: Eudicots
- Clade: Rosids
- Order: Myrtales
- Family: Myrtaceae
- Genus: Eucalyptus
- Species: E. aenea

Binomial name
- Eucalyptus aenea K.D.Hill

Species of eucalyptus

Eucalyptus aenea is a tree native to eastern Australia, known only from Goulburn River National Park in New South Wales. It is regarded as a synonym of E. viridis by the Australian Plant Census but recognized as valid by some other sources.
