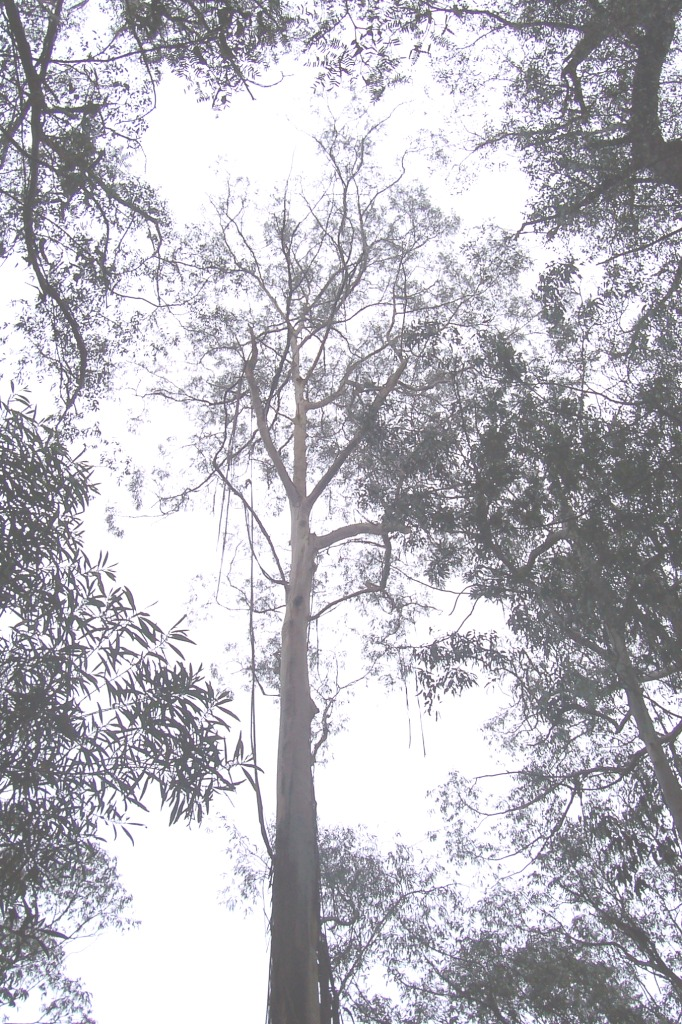
- Eucalyptus smithii, Deua National Park, Australia

Conservation status
- Least Concern (IUCN 3.1)

Scientific classification
- Kingdom: Plantae
- Clade: Tracheophytes
- Clade: Angiosperms
- Clade: Eudicots
- Clade: Rosids
- Order: Myrtales
- Family: Myrtaceae
- Genus: Eucalyptus
- Species: E. smithii

Binomial name
- Eucalyptus smithii R.T.Baker

= Eucalyptus smithii =

Gully gum

Species of eucalyptus

Eucalyptus smithii, commonly known as the gully gum, gully peppermint, blackbutt peppermint, or ironbark peppermint, is a species of medium-sized to tall tree, sometimes a mallee, that is endemic to southeastern Australia. It has rough, compact bark on the trunk, smooth ribbony bark above, narrow lance-shaped adult leaves, flower buds in groups of seven, white flowers and cup-shaped, bell-shaped or hemispherical fruit.

== Description ==
Eucalyptus smithii is a tree that typically grows to a height of 40–45 m (131–148 ft), or a mallee to 5 m (16 ft). The tree form has rough, fibrous, compact and dark grey-brown to black bark on the trunk. The bark on the branches and on the trunk and branches of mallees is smooth and white to cream-coloured. Upper branch bark is shed in long ribbons. The leaves of young plants to early sapling stage are arranged in opposite pairs, green to greyish, narrow lance-shaped, 50–110 mm (2.0–4.3 in) long and 6–25 mm (0.24–0.98 in) wide, with their bases clasping the stem. Adult leaves are arranged alternately, the same shade of slightly glossy green on both sides, narrow lance-shaped to curved, 60–210 mm (2.4–8.3 in) long and 7–16 mm (0.28–0.63 in) wide, with the base tapering to a petiole 5–28 mm (0.20–1.10 in) long. The flower buds are arranged in leaf axils in groups of seven on an unbranched peduncle 5–13 mm (0.20–0.51 in) long, the individual buds on pedicels 1–6 mm (0.039–0.236 in) long. Mature buds are oval to diamond-shaped, 4–6 mm (0.16–0.24 in) long and 3–4 mm (0.12–0.16 in) wide with a conical to beaked operculum. Flowering occurs from December to January and the flowers are white. The fruit is a woody cup-shaped, bell-shaped or hemispherical capsule 3–6 mm (0.12–0.24 in) long and 4–8 mm (0.16–0.31 in) wide with valves strongly protruding above the rim.

== Taxonomy and naming ==
Eucalyptus smithii was first formally described in 1899 by Richard Thomas Baker in Proceedings of the Linnean Society of New South Wales, from specimens collected by William Bäuerlen near Braidwood. The specific epithet (smithii) honours academic chemist Henry George Smith (1852 - 1954), for his pioneering work on essential oils of eucalypts and other Australian flora.

== Distribution and habitat ==
Gully gum grows in shallow soils on sloping sites on the coast and tablelands south from Yerranderie in New South Wales to eastern Victoria, where it occurs as a rough-barked tree in well-watered valleys or as a smooth-barked mallee on mountains.

== Conservation status ==
In 2019 E. smithii was listed as a least concern species with the International Union for the Conservation of Nature. The IUCN noted that although the population of the species is in decline and severely fragmented it has an estimated extent of occurrence of 79,397 km^{2} (30,655 sq mi) and a total area of occupancy of 616 km^{2} (238 sq mi).

== Uses ==
The species is widely grown in southern Africa, and its leaves are used for the production of distilled eucalyptus oil. The oil is high in cineole (75–84%). E. smithii also shows some promise in the pulpwood industry.

== Gallery ==
Features of the gully gum (Eucalyptus smithii)
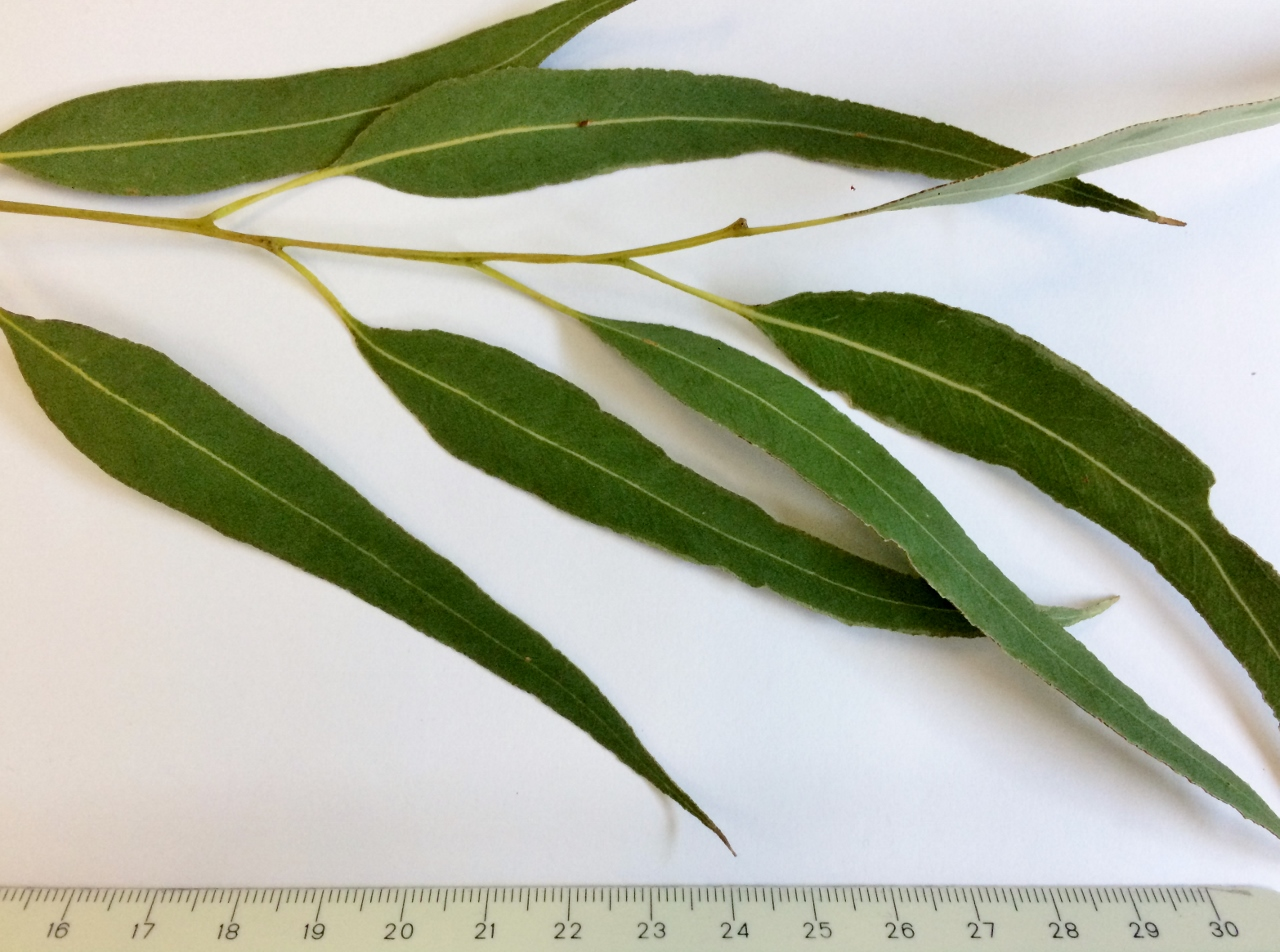
Adult leaves

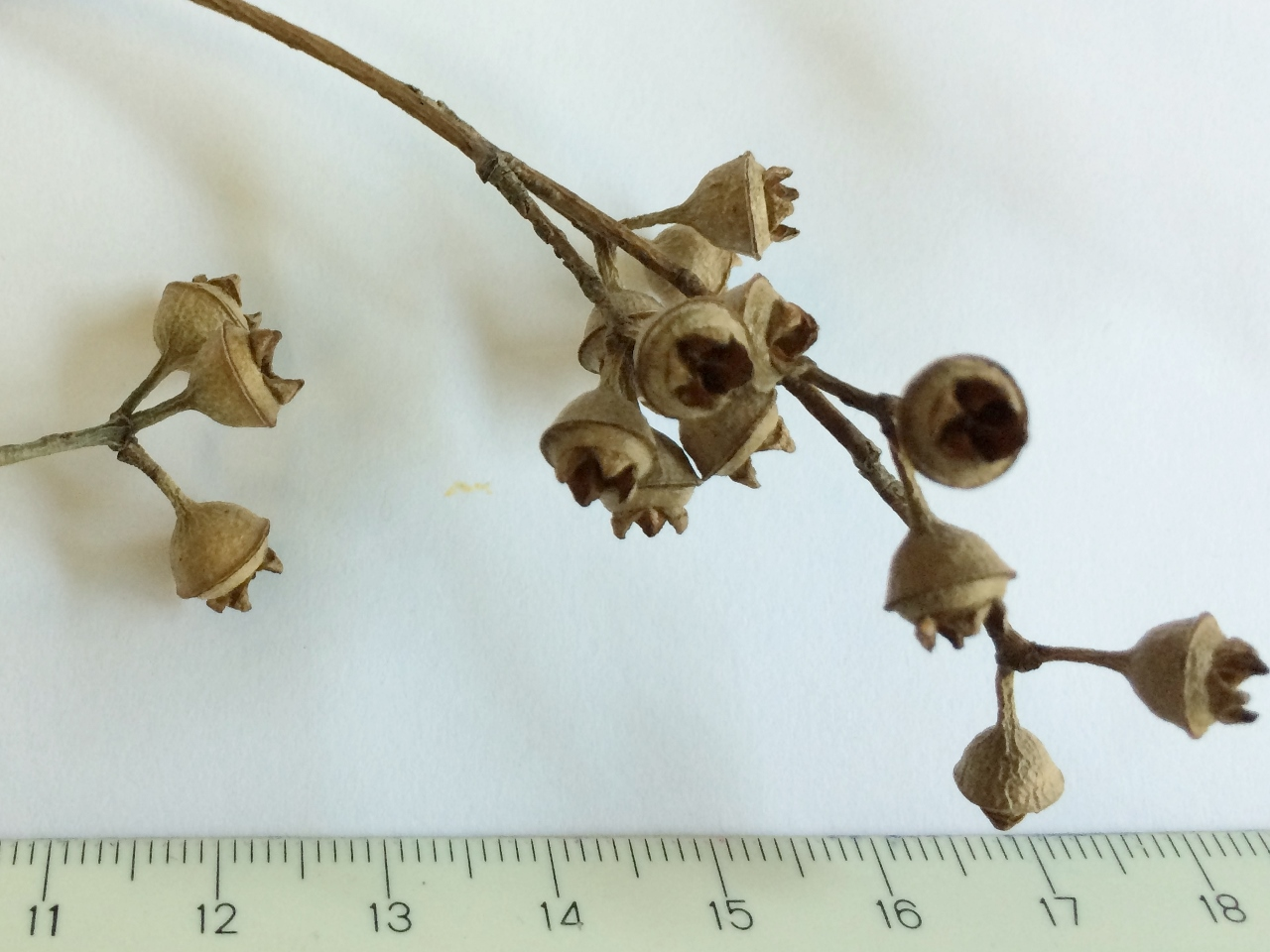
Fruit

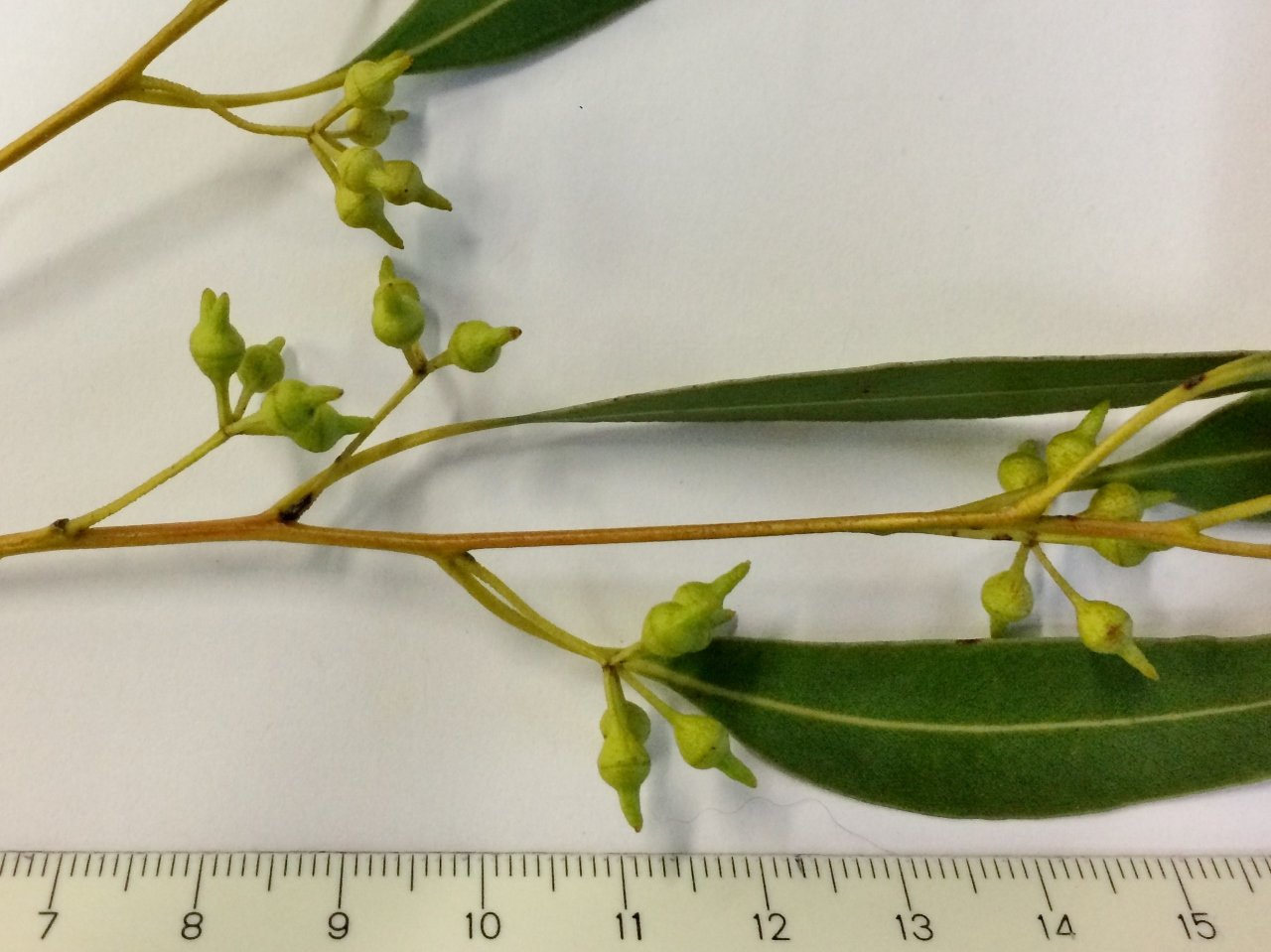
Buds

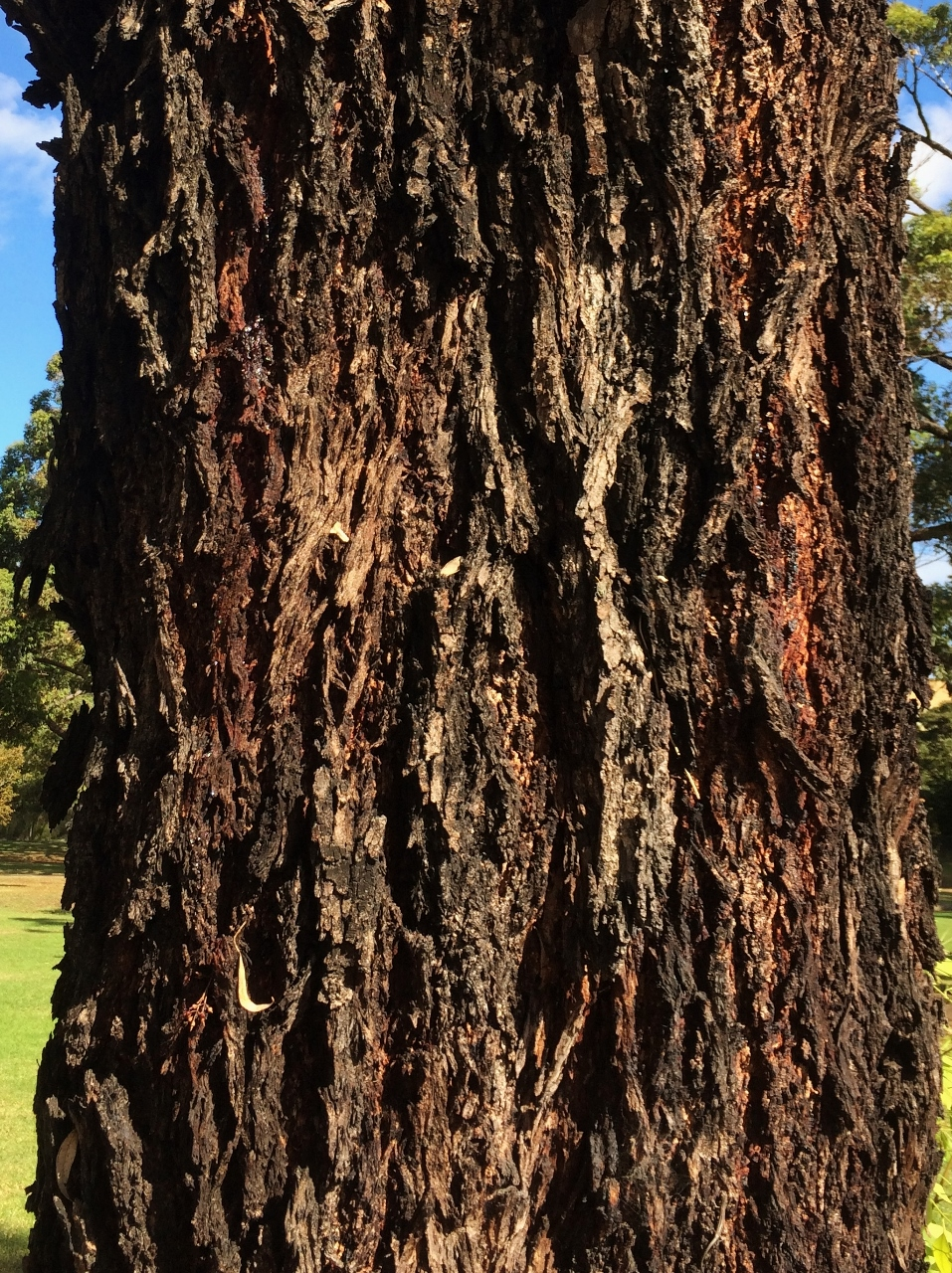
Trunk bark

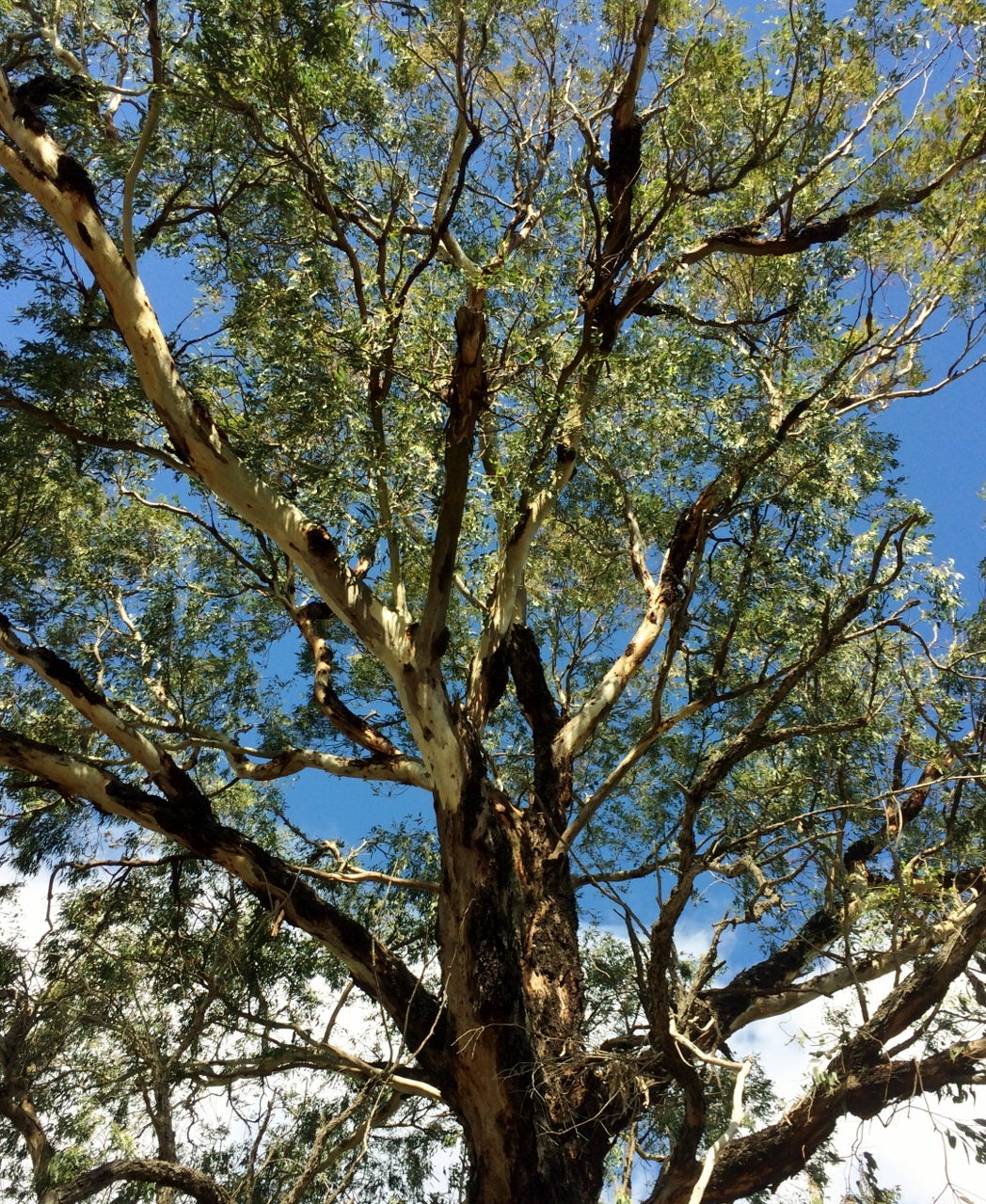
Upper branch bark
