= Olbas Oil =

Essential oil remedy

Olbas Oil is a remedy, of Swiss origin, for congestion in the chest and nose, some hayfever relief (in certain cases) and also for muscle ache via massage. It is made from a mixture of several different essential oils and has been marketed since before 1916. The name is a contraction of Oleum Basileum, "oil from Basel".

== Risk of injury ==
Olbas Oil's packaging is similar to that of eye drops, with the result that people occasionally administer it onto their eyes in error, causing injury.

The introduction of Olbas Oil into a child's eye contrary to the product's instructions for use, was noted to result in a range of adverse effects including corneal scarring.

Frequent direct application of Olbas Oil to the nasal septum may result in perforation.

== Available as ==
There are several trademarked olbas oil products:

- Olbas Oil
- Olbas for children
- Olbas inhaler
- Olbas Pastilles
- Olbas Menthol Lozenges
- Olbas bath

== Active ingredients ==
Active ingredients are listed as:

- Cajeput oil
- Clove oil
- Eucalyptus oil
- Juniper berry oil
- Levomenthol
- Methyl salicylate (Wintergreen oil)
- Peppermint oil
