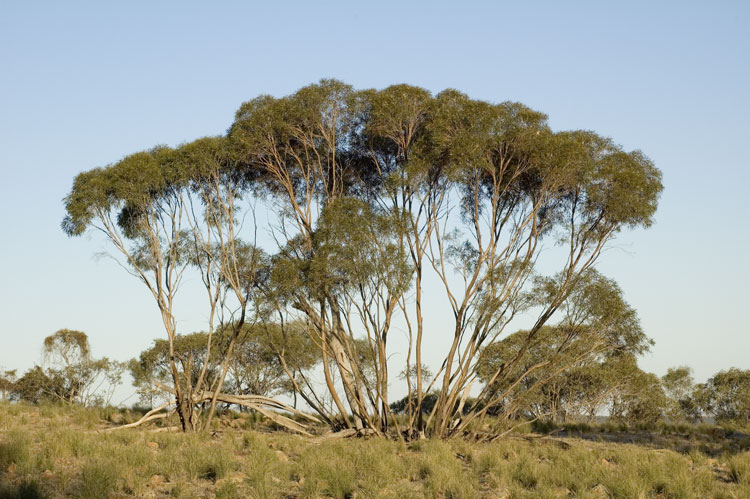
- Eucalyptus viridis near Euabalong

Scientific classification
- Kingdom: Plantae
- Clade: Embryophytes
- Clade: Tracheophytes
- Clade: Spermatophytes
- Clade: Angiosperms
- Clade: Eudicots
- Clade: Rosids
- Order: Myrtales
- Family: Myrtaceae
- Genus: Eucalyptus
- Species: E. viridis

Binomial name
- Eucalyptus viridis R.T.Baker

Synonyms
- List of synonyms: Eucalyptus acacioides A.Cunn. ex Maiden nom. illeg., nom. superfl.; Eucalyptus aenea K.D.Hill; Eucalyptus odorata var. linearis Maiden; Eucalyptus viridis R.T.Baker subsp. viridis; Eucalyptus viridis var. latiuscula Blakely; Eucalyptus viridis var. ovata Blakely; Eucalyptus viridis R.T.Baker var. viridis

= Eucalyptus viridis =

Green mallee

Species of eucalyptus

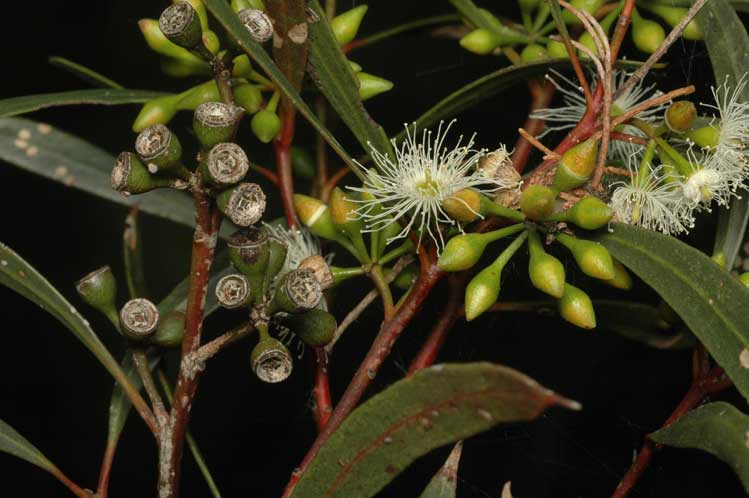
Flower buds

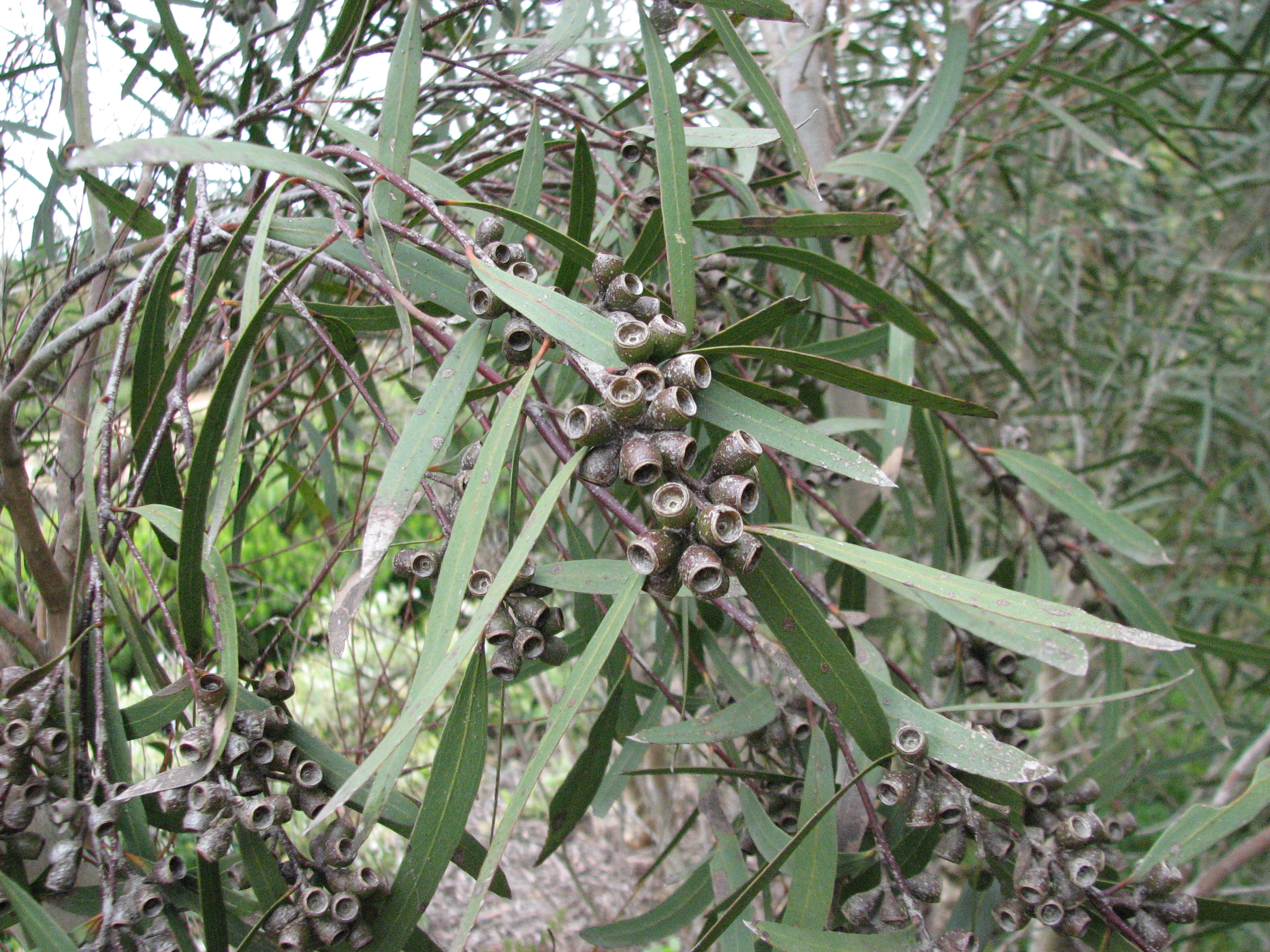
Fruit

Eucalyptus viridis, commonly known as the green mallee, is a species of mallee or small tree that is endemic to south-eastern, continental Australia. It has rough fibrous or flaky bark on the lower trunk, smooth bark above, linear to narrow lance-shaped adult leaves, flower buds in groups of seven or nine, white flowers and cup-shaped fruit.

== Description ==
Eucalyptus viridis is a mallee or small tree that typically grows to a height of 8–10 m (26–33 ft) and forms a lignotuber. It has rough, dark grey, fibrous or flaky bark on the lower stems, smooth greyish brown above, or sometimes entirely smooth bark. Yount plants and coppice regrowth have linear to narrow lance-shaped or narrow elliptical leaves that are 45–95 mm (1.8–3.7 in) long and 2–11 mm (0.079–0.433 in) wide. Adult leaves are glossy green, narrow linear to narrow lance-shaped, curved or narrow elliptical leaves that are 50–130 mm (2.0–5.1 in) long and 3–15 mm (0.12–0.59 in) wide, tapering to a petiole up to 13 mm (0.51 in)long. The flower buds are arranged on the ends of branchlets in groups of seven or nine on a branched peduncle 3–13 mm (0.12–0.51 in) long, the individual buds on pedicels 1–6 mm (0.039–0.236 in) long. Mature buds are oval to diamond-shaped, 4–8 mm (0.16–0.31 in) long and 2–4 mm (0.079–0.157 in) wide with a conical operculum. Flowering has been observed in most months and the flowers are white. The fruit is a woody, cup-shaped capsule 3–7 mm (0.12–0.28 in) long and 3–5 mm (0.12–0.20 in) wide with the valves near rim level.

== Taxonomy and naming ==
Eucalyptus viridis was first formally described in 1900 by Richard Thomas Baker in the Proceedings of the Linnean Society of New South Wales. The specific epithet (viridis) is a Latin word meaning "green".

== Distribution and habitat ==
The green mallee grows in mallee shrubland on plains and gently undulating country. It occurs in Queensland, mainly south from Taroom, through the western slopes and plains of New South Wales, near Bendigo and in the Little Desert National Park in Victoria to the south east of South Australia.

== Uses ==
This eucalypt is important in the production of honey and the leaves are harvested for cineole based eucalyptus oil.

== See also ==
- List of Eucalyptus species
