= Blue Mountains and Southern Highlands Basalt Forests =

Ecological community in New South Wales

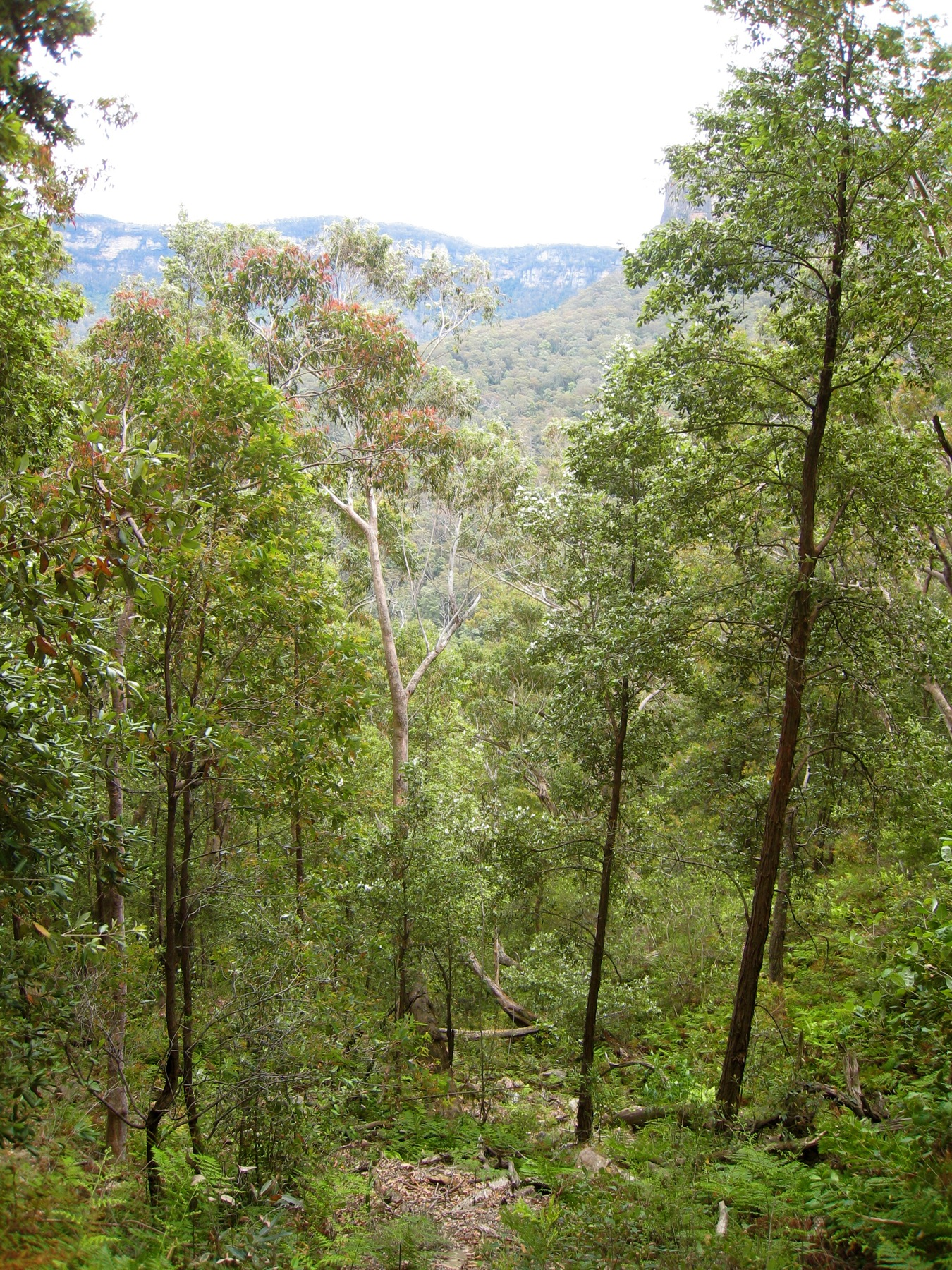
- Landscape in the Blue Mountains National Park

Ecology
- Realm: Australasia
- Biome: Temperate Broadleaf and Mixed Forests
- Borders: List: Cumberland Plain Woodland; Southern Tablelands Temperate Grassland; Southern Highlands Shale Forest and Woodland; Central Hunter Valley eucalypt forest and woodland; Shale Sandstone Transition Forest; Blue Mountains Shale Cap Forest

Geography
- Area: 100 km^{2} (39 mi^{2})
- Country: Australia
- Elevation: 750–1,100 metres (2,460–3,610 ft)
- Coordinates: 34.2°S 150.28°E
- Geology: Basalt
- Climate type: Oceanic climate (Cfb)
- Soil types: Basalt, minor clay

The Blue Mountains and Southern Highlands Basalt Forests are a sclerophyll temperate forest community that stretch from the northern fringes of the Blue Mountains to the Southern Highlands in New South Wales, Australia. Featuring both wet and dry sclerophyll forests, as well as small rainforest pockets, the community features tall (30m+) and open eucalypt forests and woodlands that lie on igneous rock (Blue Mountains Basalts).

Rainforests of the Blue Mountains, which cover just 1% of the area, feature the descendants of the forests that used to cover the ancient supercontinent of Gondwana.

== Geography ==
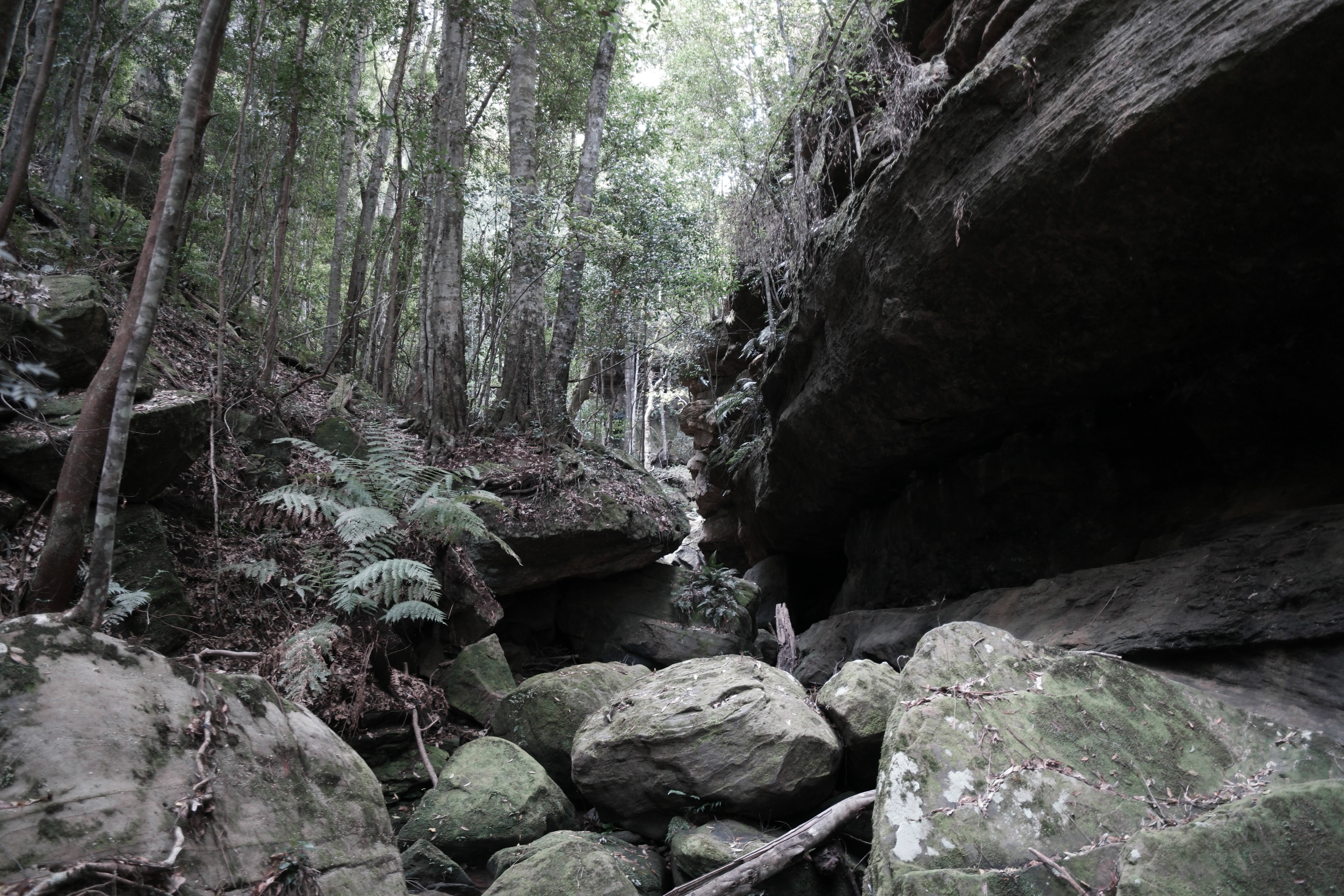
Rocky gully within Morton National Park.

Part of the Eastern Australian temperate forests, the region is found on extremely fertile soils, between 750 m and 1050 m in elevation, in areas with annual rainfall of 950 to 1350 mm, mostly in the Blue Mountains and Southern Highlands region, but it is also spread into Wolgan, Morton National Park, Meryla State Forest, Wollemi, and the basalt tops of Mount Irvine, Mount Wilson, Mount Tomah, Mount Banks and Mount Hay, with probable disjunct outliers north towards Mount Cameron and Mount Monundilla. Between 30 and 50% of the vegetation's original occurrence is estimated to remain.

The Wet Sclerophyll Basalt Forests of the Sydney Basin Bioregion, existing as a scattered remnant, also occurs in the ecoregion but in small percentage, such as in areas like the Yengo National Park, the Mount Gibraltar Reserve, Robertson, Moss Vale, Bundanoon and Wingello, which also lie on fertile soils derived from basalts.

== Forest subregions ==
Other small basalt forest patches in the region include:

- Southern Escarpment Wet Sclerophyll Forests
- Robertson Basalt Tall Open Forest
- Mount Gibraltar Forest
- Robertson Basalt Brown Barrel
- Montane Basalt Cap Forest
- Robertson Basalt Tall Forest
- Mount Gibraltar Forest
- Moist Basalt Cap Forest

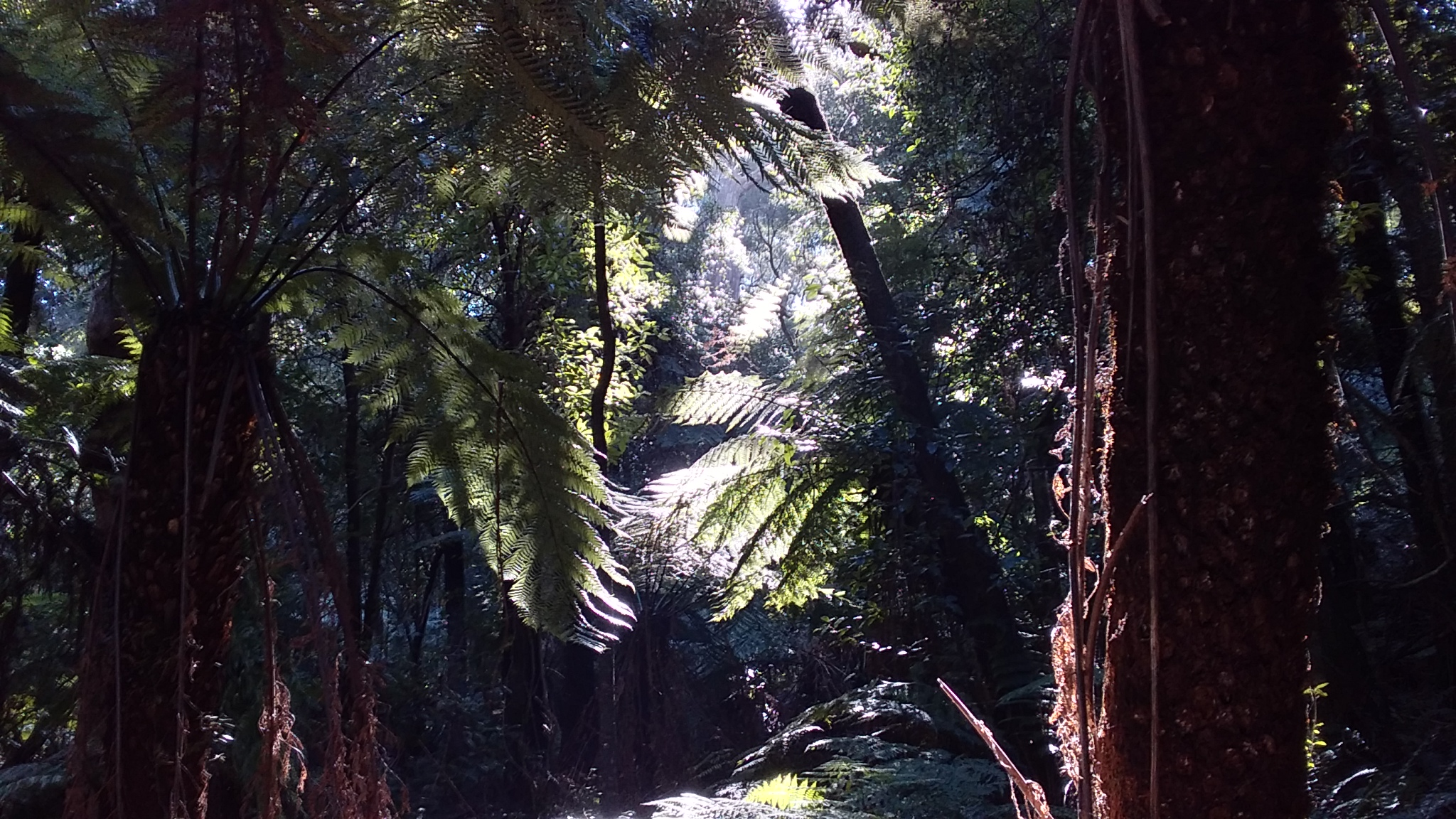
Cathedral of Ferns, Mount Wilson, a cool temperate rainforest

There are three categories of rainforest found in the Greater Blue Mountains:

- Northern Warm Temperate Rainforests (lowers slopes of the Blue Mountains, Wollemi, and Kanangra-Boyd National Park)
- Cool Temperate Rainforests (upper slopes of Mount Tomah and Mount Wilson, the upper gorges of western Kanangra-Boyd National Park and Jenolan Karst Conservation Reserve)
- Dry Rainforests (the gorges of the Kowmung and Shoalhaven Rivers, near the tributaries of the Hawkesbury River, and in protected rocky limestone pockets in Wollemi and Yengo).

The wet sclerophyll forests only inhabit 6% of the Blue Mountains landscape, and have had once occupied the Oberon area.

== Ecology ==
The canopy mixture is multivariate, but is normally predominated by species such as Eucalyptus fastigata, Eucalyptus blaxlandii, Eucalyptus cypellocarpa and Eucalyptus radiata subsp. radiata. Other locally common trees include Eucalyptus oreades, Acacia melanoxylon and Eucalyptus viminalis. A thin to dense layer of shrubs, vines, and various understorey of native grasses, forbs, twiners and ferns exist.

The wet sclerophyll parts of the ecoregion feature shrubs such as Polyscias sambucifolia, Coprosma quadrifida, Senecio linearifolius, Daviesia ulicifolia and Leucopogon lanceolatus, including vines such as, Eustrephus latifolius, Rubus parvifolius, Rubus rosifolius, Smilax australis, Hardenbergia violacea and Hibbertia scandens. Ferns include Pteridium esculentum, Blechnum cartilagineum and Pellaea falcata.

The temperate rainforests feature plant species such as Ceratopetalum apetalum, Livistona australis, Acmena smithii, Acacia elata, Syncarpia glomulifera, Doryphora sassafras and Hedycarya angustifolia, with the dry rainforests containing Backhousia myrtifolia, Ficus rubiginosa, Rapanea variabilis and Alectryon subcinereus.

=== Fauna ===
Mammals include wallabies, pademelons, native rats, Antechinus spp, Tachyglossus aculeatus, Vombatus ursinus, Macropus giganteus and Pteropus poliocephalus. Birds include Ninox strenua, Tyto tenebricosa, Monarcha melanopsis, Leucosarcia melanoleuca, Lopholaimus antarcticus, Chalcophaps indica, Macropygia amboinensis and Rhipidura rufifrons. Threatened reptile species is Varanus rosenbergi.

== See also ==
- Western Sydney Dry Rainforest
- Southern Sydney sheltered forest
