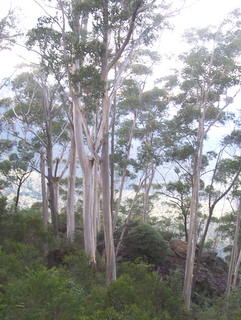
- Eucalyptus oreades at Narrow Neck, Katoomba, Australia

Scientific classification
- Kingdom: Plantae
- Clade: Tracheophytes
- Clade: Angiosperms
- Clade: Eudicots
- Clade: Rosids
- Order: Myrtales
- Family: Myrtaceae
- Genus: Eucalyptus
- Species: E. oreades

Binomial name
- Eucalyptus oreades R.T.Baker

Synonyms
- Eucalyptus altior (H.Deane & Maiden) Maiden nom. illeg.; Eucalyptus luehmanniana var. altior H.Deane & Maiden; Eucalyptus virgata var. altior H.Deane & Maiden

= Eucalyptus oreades =

Blue Mountains ash

Species of eucalyptus

Eucalyptus oreades, commonly known as the Blue Mountains ash, white ash or smooth-barked mountain ash, is a species of medium-sized to tall tree that is native to eastern Australia. It has smooth, powdery whitish bark with rough bark near the base, lance-shaped to curved adult leaves, flower buds in groups of seven, white flowers and cup-shaped to cylindrical fruit.

== Description ==
Eucalyptus oreades is a tree that typically grows to a height of 40 m (130 ft), with a trunk up to 1.8 m (5 ft 11 in) in diameter at chest height, but does not form a lignotuber. It has smooth white or yellow bark that is shed in strips, leaving a 'skirt' of thicker bark for up to 4 m (13 ft) of the base. Young plants and coppice regrowth have elliptical to egg-shaped leaves that are the same shade of dull greyish green on both sides, 80–200 mm (3.1–7.9 in) long and 35–100 mm (1.4–3.9 in) wide. Adult leaves are the same shade of glossy green on both sides, lance-shaped to curved, 75–180 mm (3.0–7.1 in) long and 10–32 mm (0.39–1.26 in) wide on a petiole 10–22 mm (0.39–0.87 in) long. The flower buds are arranged in leaf axils in groups of seven on a slightly flattened, unbranched peduncle 15–25 mm (0.59–0.98 in) long, the individual buds on pedicels 2–5 mm (0.079–0.197 in) long. Mature buds are diamond-shaped to spindle-shaped, about 5 mm (0.20 in) long and 3–4 mm (0.12–0.16 in) wide with a conical to beaked operculum. Flowering occurs from January to March and the flowers are white. The fruit is a woody, cup-shaped, urn-shaped or cylindrical capsule 5–10 mm (0.20–0.39 in) long and 6–10 mm (0.24–0.39 in) wide with the valves near rim level.

== Taxonomy and naming ==
Eucalyptus oreades was first formally described in 1900 by Richard Thomas Baker in the Proceedings of the Linnean Society of New South Wales from specimens Baker and Henry George Smith collected at Adelina Falls near Lawson in the Blue Mountains on 22 April 1899. The species name is derived from Oreades, Greek mountains nymphs, referring to the habitat of this species.

== Distribution and habitat ==
Blue Mountains ash occurs from Mittagong in the Southern Highlands north to Binna Burra and Springbrook in far south-eastern Queensland. It is widespread in the Blue Mountains, with a somewhat scattered distribution elsewhere. It is found on sandstone soils in the Blue Mountains, and red clay loams elsewhere. In the Blue Mountains, it is found on steep slopes and ridges, on southern or eastern aspects, from elevations of 600 to 1,200 metres (2,000 to 3,900 ft) and annual rainfall of 900 to 1,400 millimetres (35 to 55 in). The habitat is open eucalypt forest, and associated species include silvertop ash (E. sieberi), narrow-leaved peppermint (E. radiata), broad-leaved peppermint (E. dives), Sydney peppermint (E. piperita), Blaxland's stringybark (E. blaxlandii), snappy gum (E. racemosa), messmate stringybark (E. obliqua), tallowwood (E. microcorys), and New England blackbutt (E. andrewsii).

== Ecology ==
Eucalyptus oreades is unusual for a eucalypt in that it lacks a lignotuber and therefore is sensitive to bushfire, and often succumbs, with recruitment coming from the seeds stored in the canopy seedbank. Mature trees over 20 years of age do have a skirt of thicker corky bark which helps them resist low-intensity fires.

== Uses ==
Very fast growing in cultivation, Eucalyptus oreades is grown in plantations for timber, both in Australia and overseas in New Zealand and South Africa.

== Gallery ==
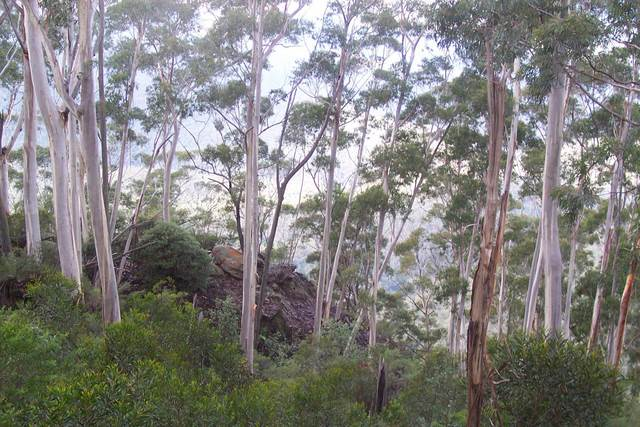
Eucalyptus oreades at Narrow Neck, Katoomba

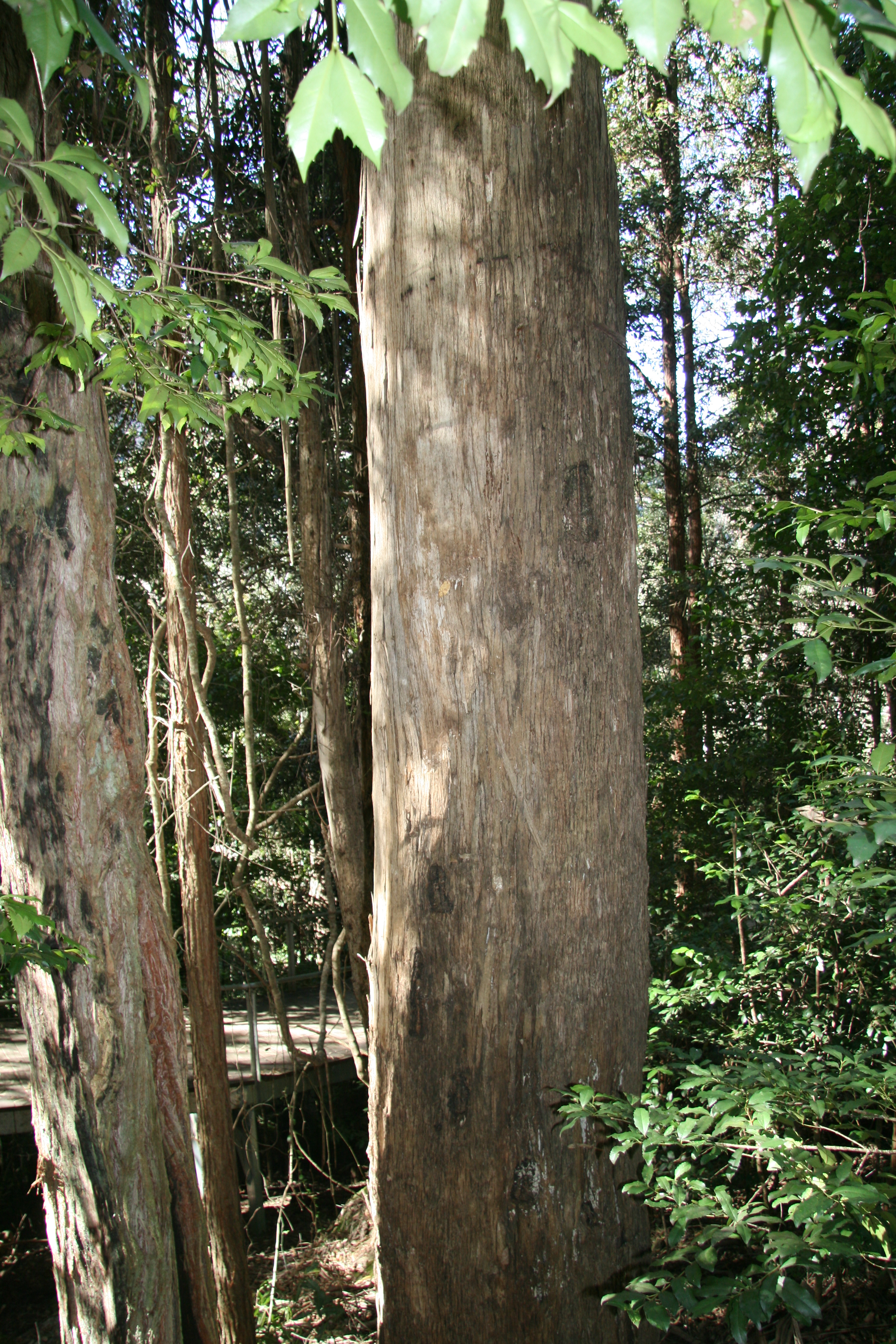
Eucalyptus oreades trunk at Katoomba

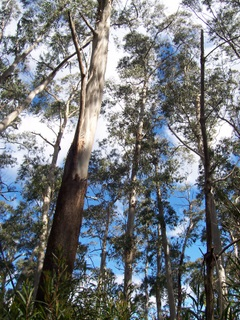
Blue Mountains Ash on Mount Banda Banda
