= Southern Highlands Shale Forest and Woodland =

Ecological community in New South Wales

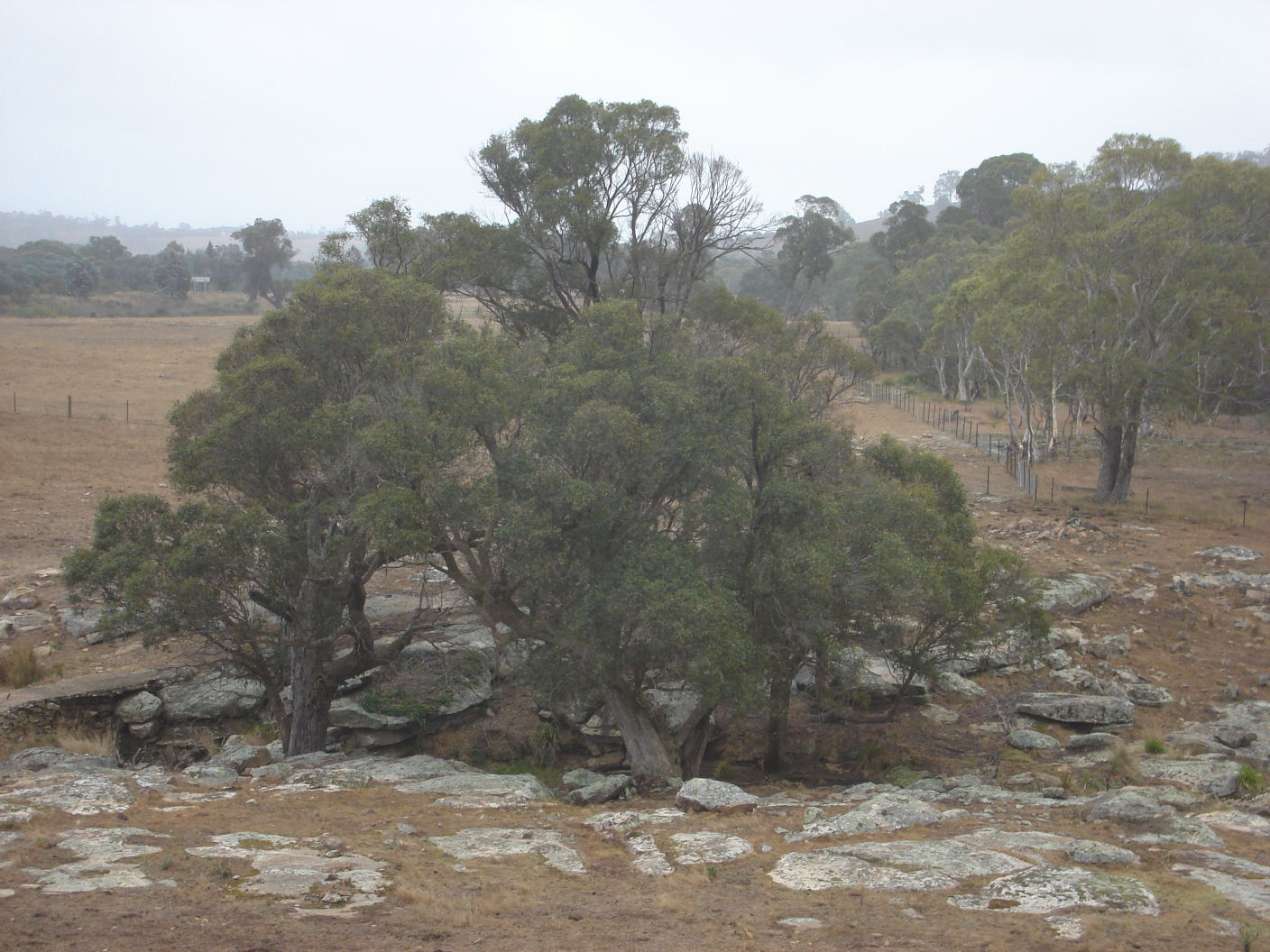
- Sutton Forest

Ecology
- Realm: Australasia
- Biome: Temperate grasslands, savannas, and shrublands; Temperate Broadleaf and Mixed Forests
- Borders: List: Cumberland Plain Woodland; Southern Tablelands Temperate Grassland; Blue Mountains and Southern Highlands Basalt Forests; Shale Sandstone Transition Forest; Lowland Grassy Woodland; Illawarra-Shoalhaven subtropical rainforest

Geography
- Area: 60 km^{2} (23 mi^{2})
- Country: Australia
- Elevation: 600–800 metres (2,000–2,600 ft)
- Coordinates: 34.5°S 150.58°E
- Geology: Sedimentary rock
- Climate type: Oceanic climate (Cfb)
- Soil types: Clay

The Southern Highlands Shale Forest and Woodland is a mixed grassy woodland and sclerophyll-temperate forest community situated within the Southern Highlands region of New South Wales, Australia. An ecotone featuring clay soils derived from Wianamatta Group, it is listed as an endangered ecological community by the Environment Protection and Biodiversity Conservation Act 1999 as less than 5% of the original extent remains today. Three varieties of the Shale Woodland exist: ‘typical’, ‘tall wet’ and ‘short dry’.

== Geography ==
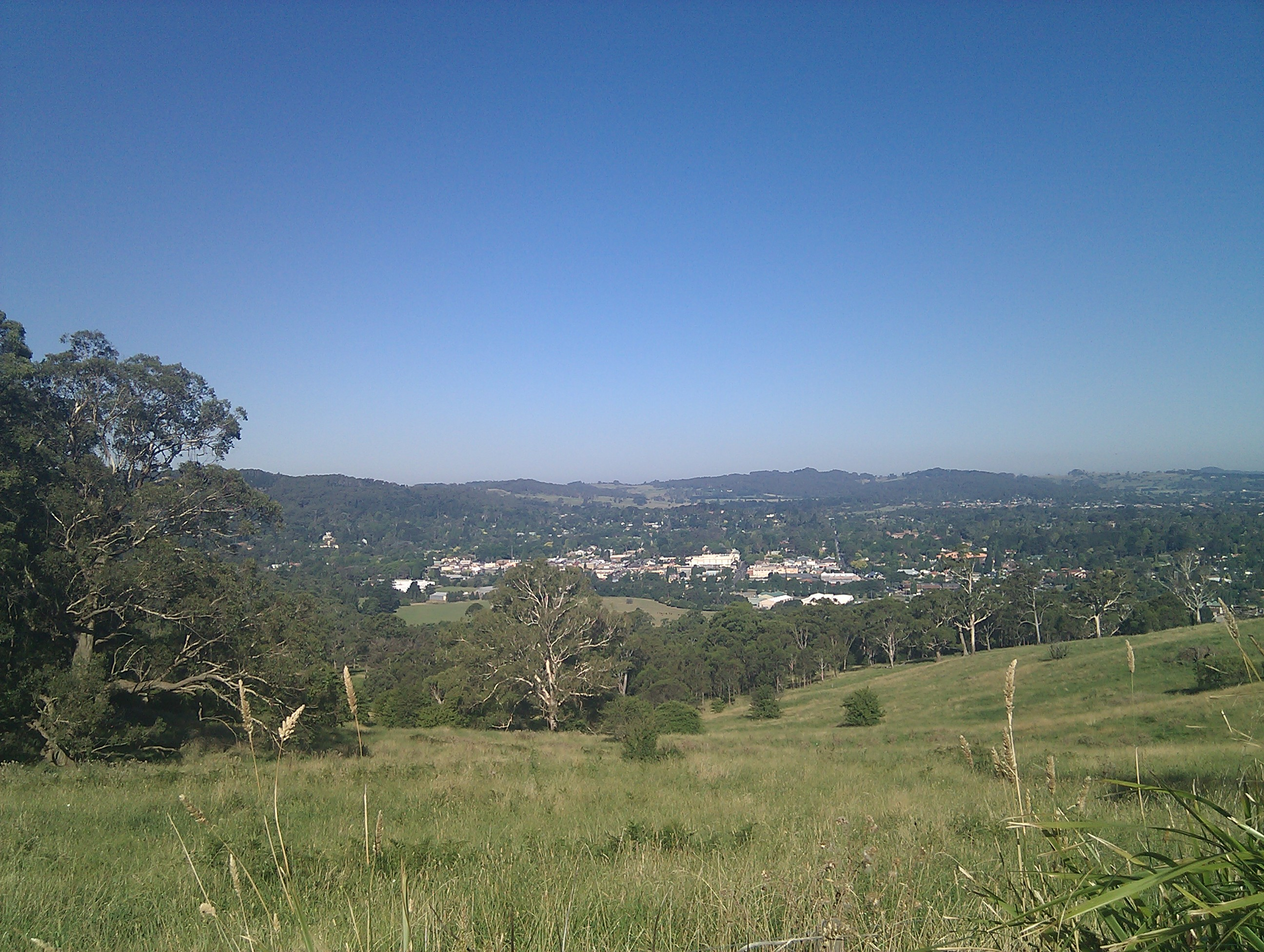
Grassy, hilly woods near Bowral

The community is restricted to a small area in the Southern Highlands, on lightly rolling hills and some precipitous slopes on shale, in disjointed and fragmented patches of less than five hectares (12 acres) in area.

It is present within an area bounded by the Illawarra Escarpment in the east, Burrawang and Bundanoon in the south, Canyonleigh and Mittagong in the west and Berrima and Colo Vale in the north, with extended remnants of it reaching Wollongong to the east coast, the Royal National Park in Southern Sydney to the northeast and as well as the Blue Mountains in the northwest. It also occurs in the Wingecarribee local government area. The community is multivariate, as it features tall open eucalyptus forest found in Eastern Australian temperate forests, which grade into dry grassy woodland and scrub, reminiscent of the transition observed in a Forest–savanna mosaic, although it originally existed as woodland. The soils are derived from Wianamatta Shale. Annual precipitation ranges from 1,400 mm (55 in) in the east to 900 mm (35 in) in the west.

The Cecil Hoskins Nature Reserve, Nattai National Park, Morton National Park, Hammock Hill and Old Bowral Airfield council features the community. It is also present between the grassy woodlands and forests of the Southern Tablelands in the west and the Cumberland Plain in the north.

== Ecology ==
Common species include Eucalyptus cypellocarpa, Eucalyptus piperita, Eucalyptus ovata, Eucalyptus radiata and Eucalyptus globoidea, Eucalyptus mannifera, Eucalyptus pauciflora, Eucalyptus amplifolia and Eucalyptus macarthurii, with Angophora floribunda being less common. The open shrub layer features Melaleuca thymifolia, Olearia microphylla and Daviesia ulicifolia.

The ground layer includes native grasses such as Themeda australis, Microlaena stipoides and Austrodanthonia species. Herbaceous plants present in the region are, Lomandra longifolia, Gonocarpus tetragynus, Hardenbergia violacea, Veronica plebeia, Hypericum gramineum, Poranthera microphylla and Viola hederacea.

=== Animals ===
Animals include Heleioporus australiacus, Dasyurus maculatus, Varanus rosenbergi, Potorous tridactylus, Petroica boodang, Anthochaera phrygia, Calyptorhynchus lathami, Ninox strenua, Anthochaera phrygia and Petaurus australis.
