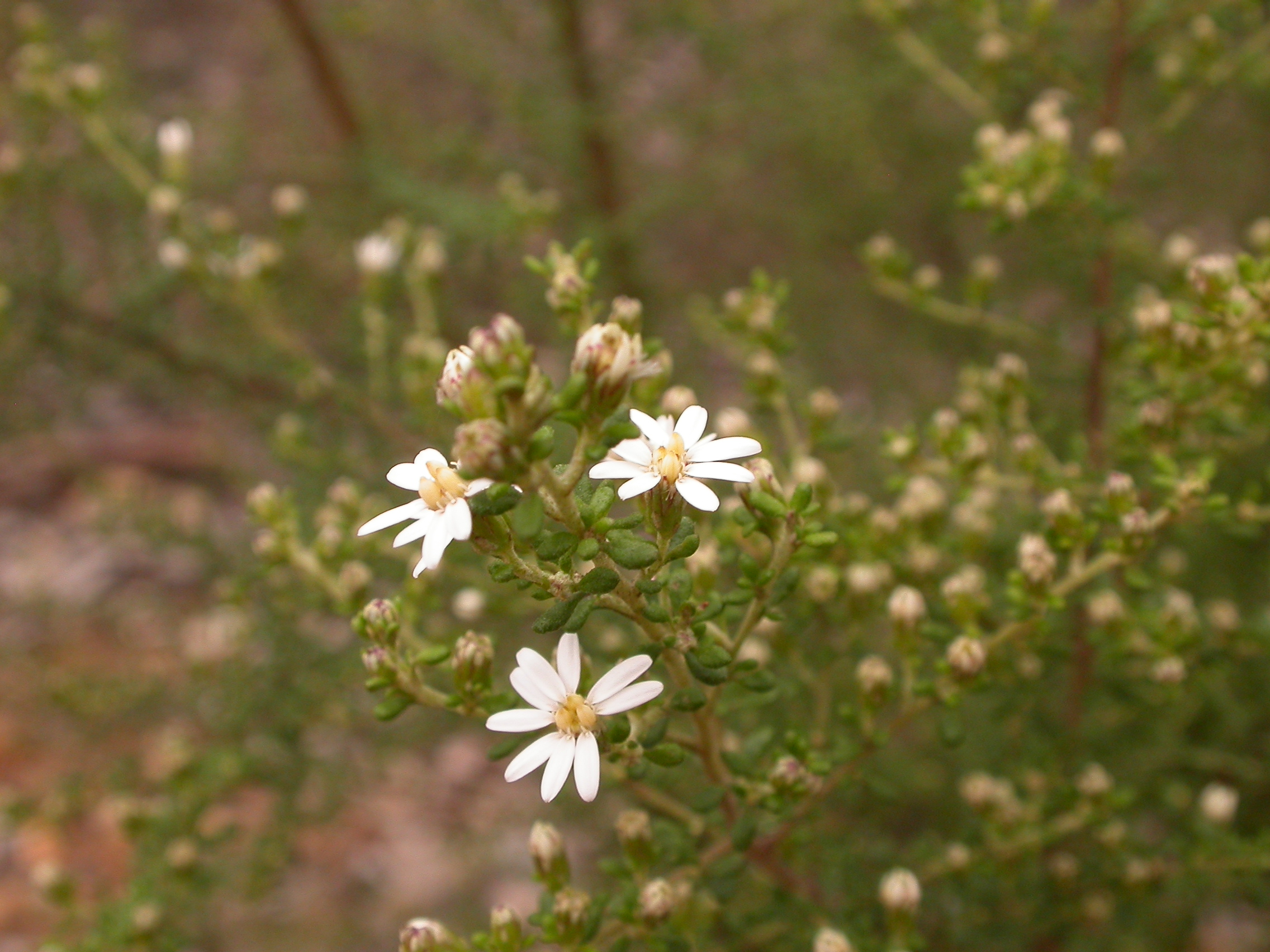
- On Black Mountain (Australian Capital Territory)

Scientific classification
- Kingdom: Plantae
- Clade: Tracheophytes
- Clade: Angiosperms
- Clade: Eudicots
- Clade: Asterids
- Order: Asterales
- Family: Asteraceae
- Genus: Olearia
- Species: O. microphylla

Binomial name
- Olearia microphylla (Vent.) Maiden & Betche

Synonyms
- Aster microphyllus Vent.; Diplostephium microphyllum (Vent.) Nees; Eurybia microphylla (Vent.) DC.; Olearia microphylla (Vent.) Druce isonym; Olearia ramulosa f. microphylla (Vent.) Siebert & Voss; Olearia ramulosa var. microphylla (Vent.) Benth.; Shawia microphylla (Vent.) Sch.Bip.

= Olearia microphylla =

Species of shrub

Olearia microphylla, commonly known as snow bush, small-leaved daisy-bush or twiggy daisy-bush, is a species of flowering plant in the family Asteraceae and is endemic to eastern Australia. It is a shrub with spatula-shaped leaves with the edges rolled under, and white and yellow, daisy-like inflorescences.

== Description ==
Olearia microphylla is a shrub that typically grows to a height of up to 2 m (6 ft 7 in). Its leaves are spatula-shaped, 2–7 mm (0.079–0.276 in) long and 1–3 mm (0.039–0.118 in) wide and more or less sessile, the upper surface pimply, the lower surface covered with greyish, woolly hairs and the edges rolled under. The heads or daisy-like "flowers" are arranged singly on the ends of side branches and are 9–17 mm (0.35–0.67 in) in diameter and sessile. Each head has six to eight white ray florets surrounding four to eight yellow disc florets. Flowering occurs from June to October and the fruit is a glandular achene, the pappus with 32 to 47 bristles.

== Taxonomy ==
Snow bush was first formally described in 1804 by Étienne Pierre Ventenat who gave it the name Aster microphyllus in his book Jardin de la Malmaison. In 1916, Joseph Maiden and Ernst Betche changed the name to Olearia microphylla in A Census of New South Wales Plants. The specific epithet (microphylla) means "small-leaved".

== Distribution and habitat ==
Olearia microphylla is widespread from south-eastern Queensland through eastern New South Wales and the Australian Capital Territory and as far south as the Queanbeyan district, growing in shrubland, heath and sclerophyll forest, where it is associated with such species as Eucalyptus sieberi and Eucalyptus sclerophylla.
