= Southern Sydney sheltered forest =

Coordinates: 33°44.306′S 151°5.434′E

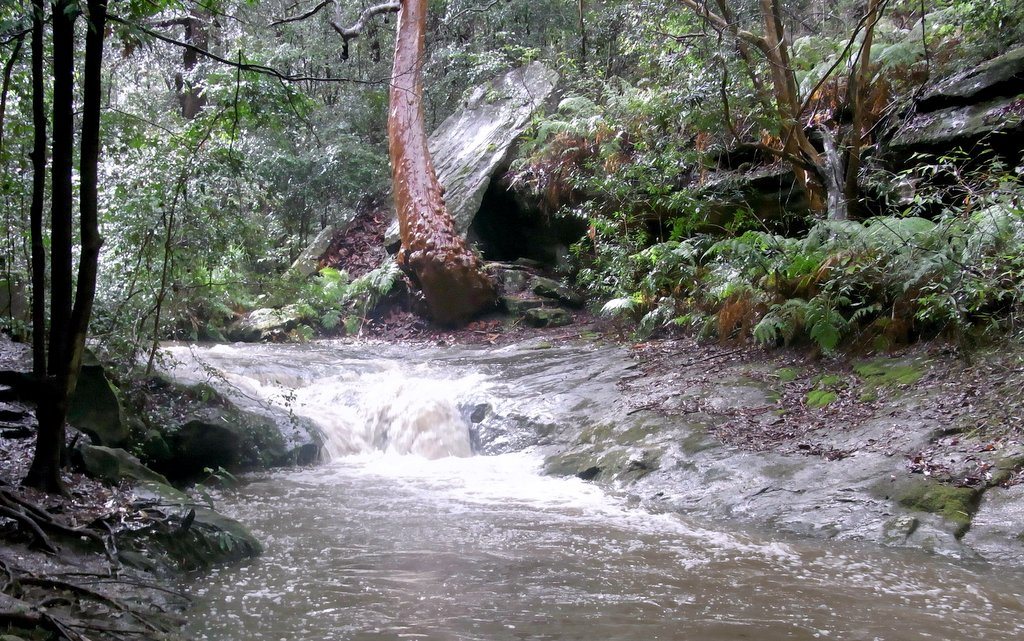
- Sydney Red Gum at Chatswood, Australia

Ecology
- Realm: Australasia
- Biome: Temperate broadleaf and mixed forests
- Borders: Shale Sandstone Transition Forest; Blue Gum High Forest; Sydney Turpentine-Ironbark Forest; Sydney Sandstone Ridgetop Woodland

Geography
- Country: Australia
- Elevation: 30–90 metres (98–295 ft)
- Geology: Sandstone, shale
- Climate type: Humid subtropical climate (Cfa)
- Soil types: Clay, sand (podsol), loam

The Southern Sydney sheltered forest, or the Sydney Sandstone Gully Forest (SSGF), is a vegetation community found in Sydney, Australia that comprises an open forest composition grading into woodland or scrub, typically within gullies. The community is normally associated with sheltered heads and upper inclines of gullies on transitional zones where sandstone outcropping may be present.

The community also incorporates Western Sandstone Gully Forest to the west and Coastal Sandstone Gully Forest to the east on the infertile Hawkesbury sandstone.

== Geography ==
The sheltered forest on transitional sandstone soils is an open forest or woodland dominated by eucalyptus trees with disjointed subcanopy trees, various shrub layer and a groundcover of ferns, forbs, grasses and graminoids, primarily on soft terrain, with slopes rarely surpassing 10°, and sandstone outcrops occur at parts, compared to areas within well-developed, precipitous gullies.

The forest occurs in sheltered gullies and hillsides, on soils based on Hawkesbury Sandstone with some clay influences, principally centred on Allenby Park in Allambie Heights. It occupies areas that receive more than 1000mm of average annual rainfall. This is a fairly flat terrain with occasional slopes up to 10°.

The sheltered forest been recorded in the local government areas of Campbelltown, Liverpool, Georges River, Hurstville, Kogarah, Sutherland, Wollondilly and Wollongong in the Sydney Basin Bioregion with an extent of less than 45 000 ha, where it is bounded by Hurstville, Carss Park, Bundeena, Otford, Stanwell Tops, Darkes Forest, Punchbowl Creek and Menai.

== Ecology ==
Common tree species include the blackbutt, Sydney Red Gum, turpentine and Watergum.

Other species include Corymbia gummifera, Eucalyptus piperita, Eucalyptus sieberi, Banksia serrata, Ceratopetalum gummiferum, Smilax glyciphylla, Acacia suaveolens, Acacia terminalis and Banksia ericifolia.

== See also ==
- Ecology of Sydney
