= Yengo =

Yengo is a surname. Notable people with the surname include:

- Brigitte Yengo, Congolese nun
- Patrice Yengo (born 1949), Congolese anthropologist
