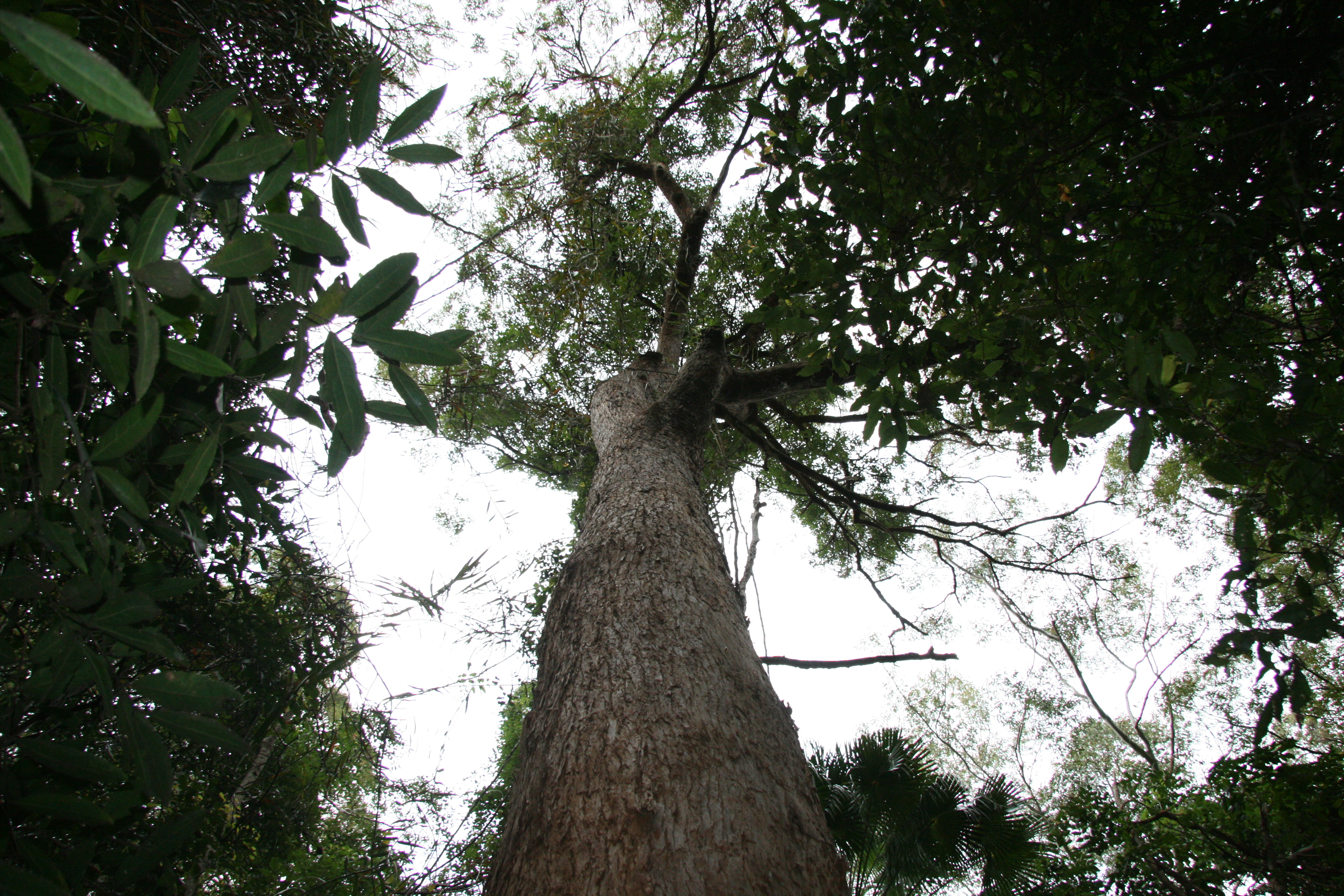

Conservation status
- Near Threatened (IUCN 3.1)

Scientific classification
- Kingdom: Plantae
- Clade: Tracheophytes
- Clade: Angiosperms
- Clade: Eudicots
- Clade: Rosids
- Order: Myrtales
- Family: Myrtaceae
- Genus: Eucalyptus
- Species: E. microcorys

Binomial name
- Eucalyptus microcorys F.Muell.

= Eucalyptus microcorys =

Tallowwood

Species of eucalyptus

Eucalyptus microcorys, commonly known as tallowwood, is a species of medium to tall tree that is endemic to eastern Australia. It has rough, fibrous or string bark on the trunk and branches, lance-shaped to egg-shaped adult leaves, flower buds in groups of seven or nine, white to lemon-yellow flowers and conical fruit. It grows in forests near the coast of Queensland and New South Wales.

== Description ==
Eucalyptus microcorys is a tree that typically grows to a height of 40–60 m (130–200 ft), occasionally to 70 m (230 ft) and forms a lignotuber. It has rough, fibrous or stringy brownish bark on the trunk and branches. Young plants and coppice regrowth have egg-shaped leaves that are paler on the lower surface, 40–110 mm (1.6–4.3 in) long and 15–50 mm (0.59–1.97 in) wide. Adult leaves are glossy green, paler on the lower surface, lance-shaped to egg-shaped or slightly curved, 60–150 mm (2.4–5.9 in) long and 15–35 mm (0.59–1.38 in) wide on a petiole 10–15 mm (0.39–0.59 in) long. The leaf veins are prominent, well-spaced and at an angle greater than 45° to the leaf mid-rib. The flower buds are usually arranged at the ends of the branchlets, on a branched peduncle in groups of seven or nine, the peduncle 4–18 mm (0.16–0.71 in) long, the individual buds on pedicels 4–8 mm (0.16–0.31 in) long. Mature buds are club-shaped, yellow, 3–5 mm (0.12–0.20 in) long and about 3 mm (0.12 in) wide with a rounded operculum. Flowering occurs between August and January and the flowers are white to lemon-yellow. The fruit is a woody conical capsule 5–9 mm (0.20–0.35 in) long and 5–6 mm (0.20–0.24 in) wide with the valves near rim level.

== Taxonomy and naming ==
Eucalyptus microcorys was first formally described in 1860 by Ferdinand von Mueller in Fragmenta Phytographiae Australiae from specimens collected by Hermann Beckler near the Hastings and Macleay Rivers. The specific epithet (microcorys) is from the ancient Greek micro- meaning "small" and corys meaning "helmet".

== Distribution and habitat ==
Tallowwood mainly grows in tall open forest on fertile soil on slopes and ridges and in valleys. It is found from K'gari in Queensland, south to Cooranbong in New South Wales and as far inland as Toowoomba.

== Gallery ==
Features of the tallowwood (Eucalyptus microcorys)
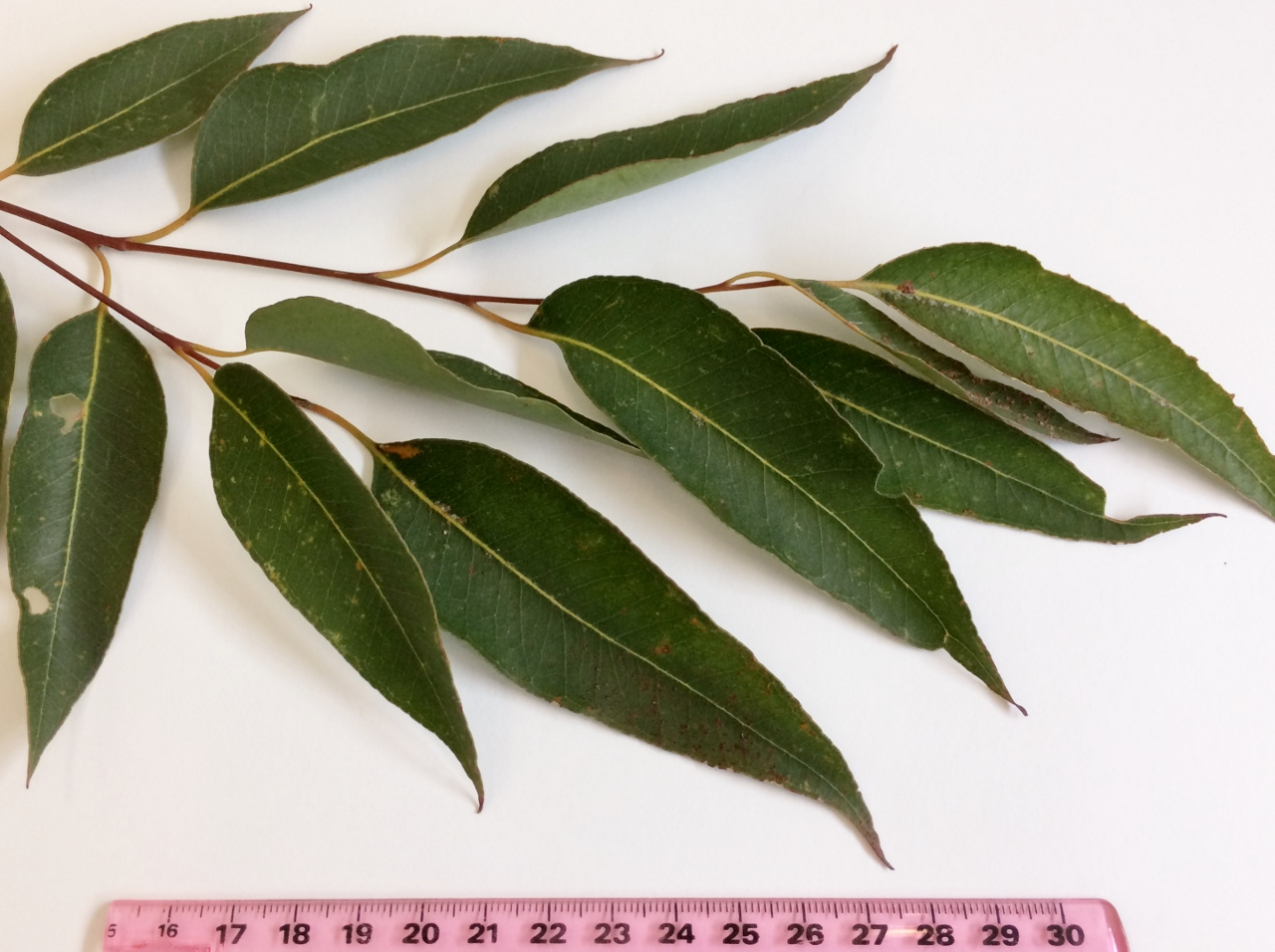
Adult leaves

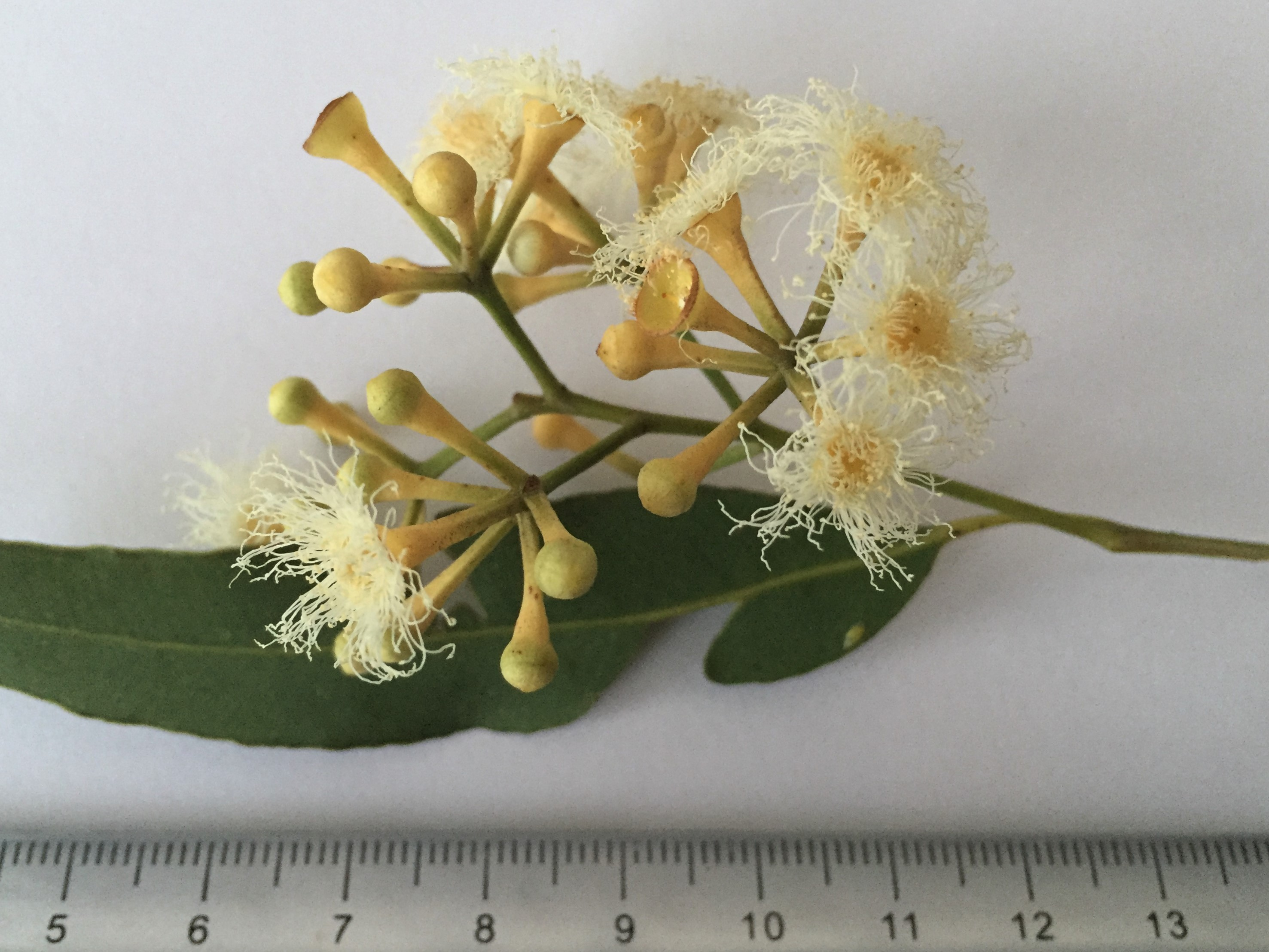
Buds and flowers

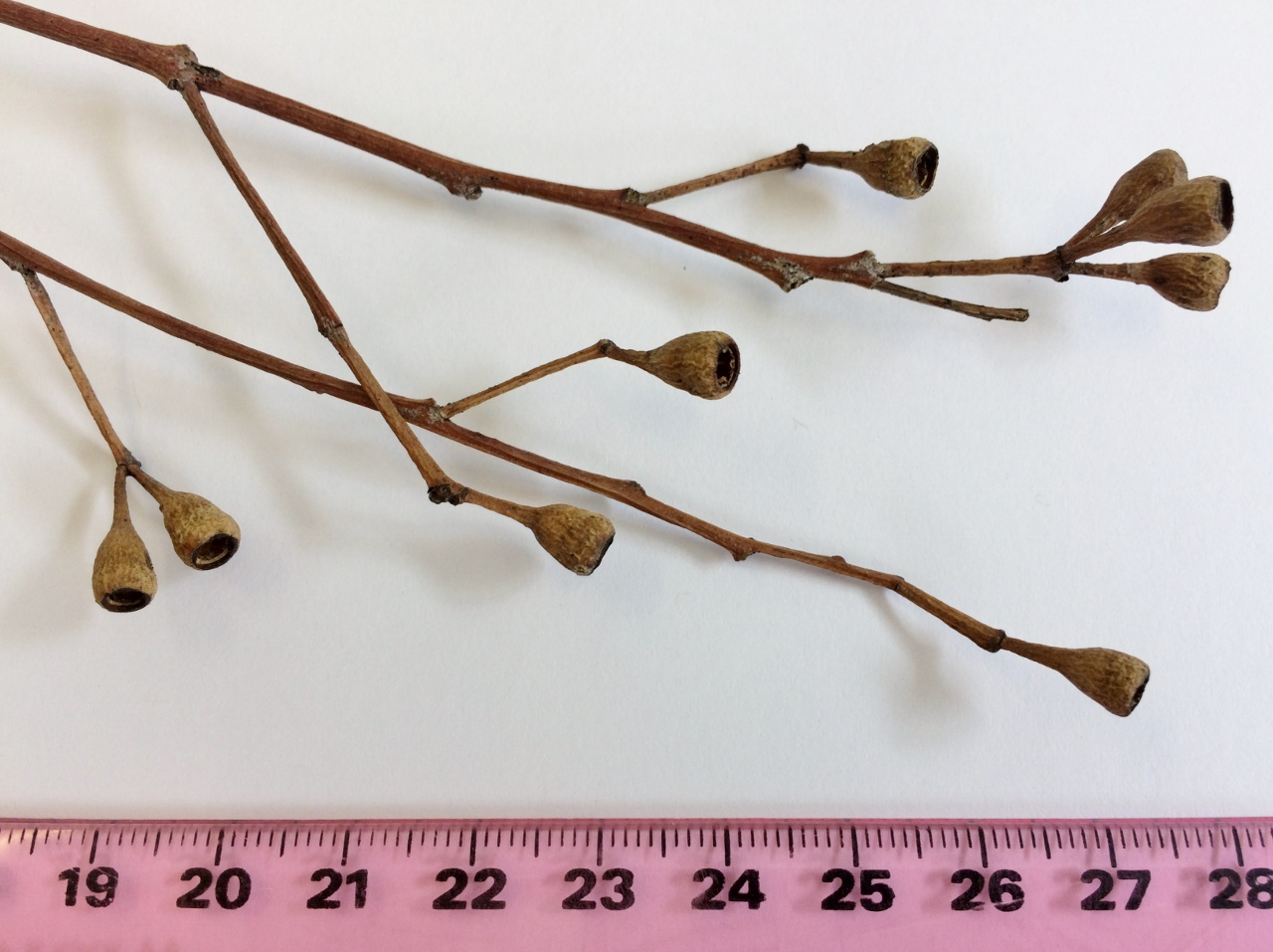
Fruit

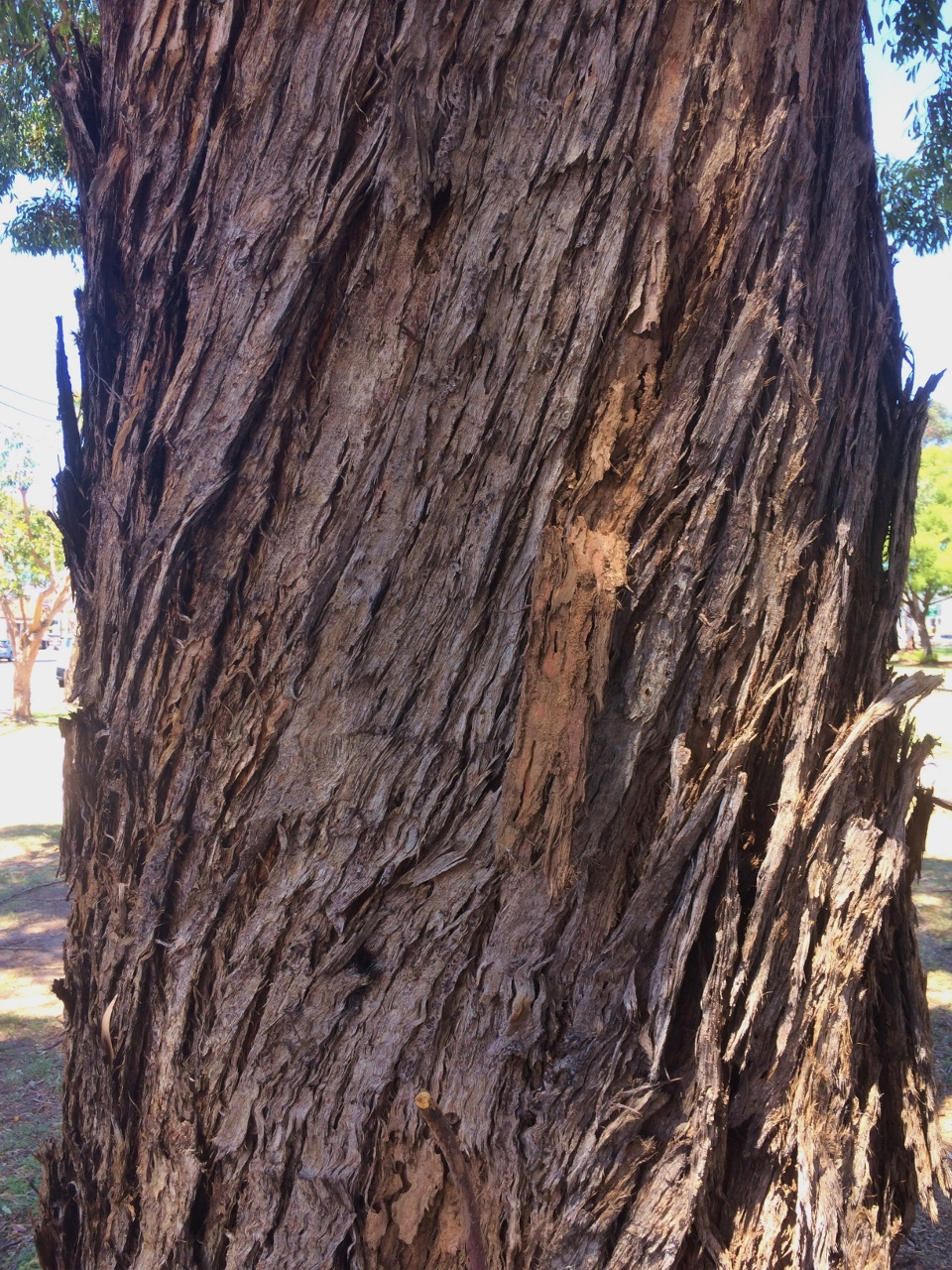
Trunk bark

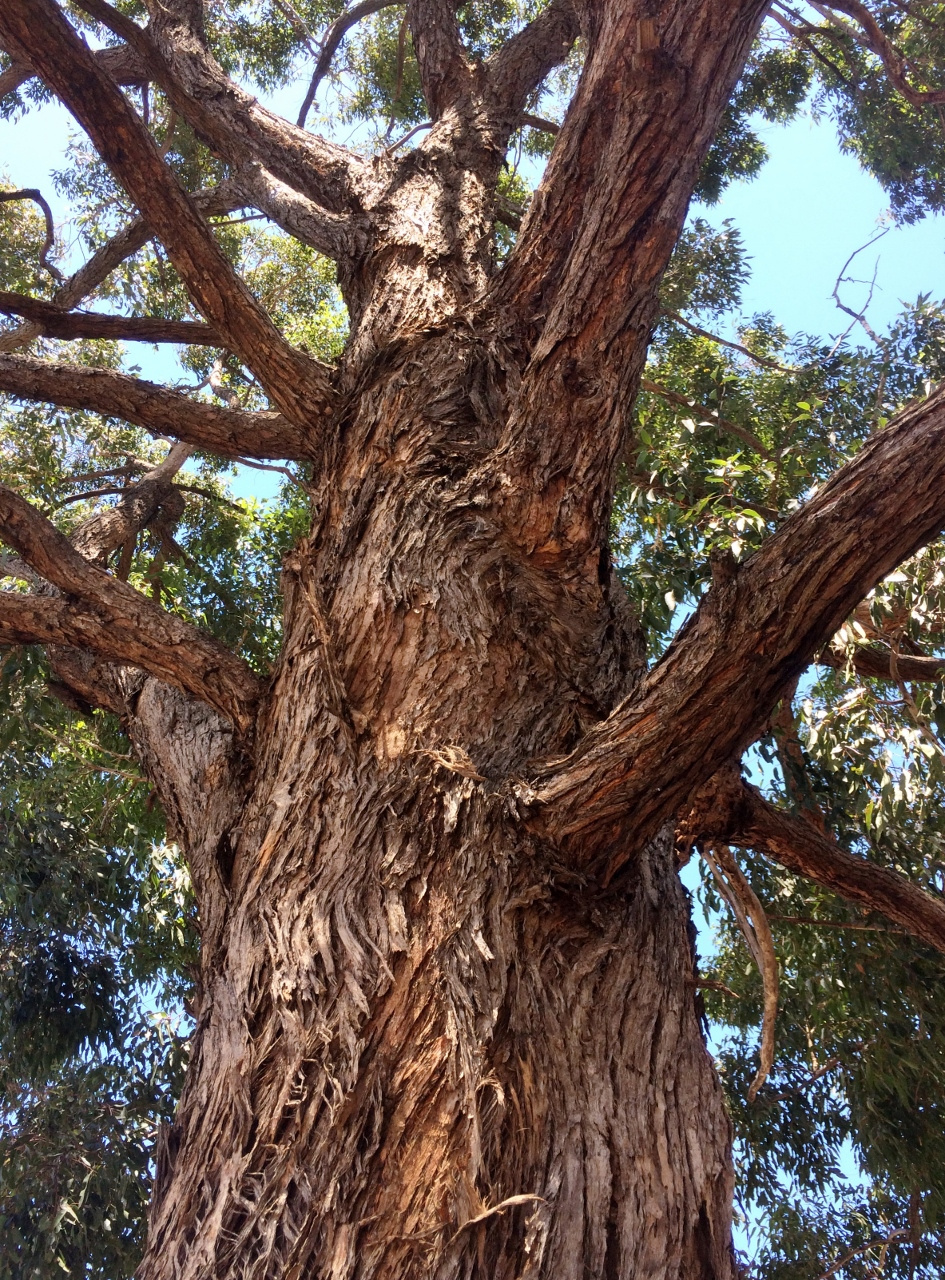
Upper branch bark
