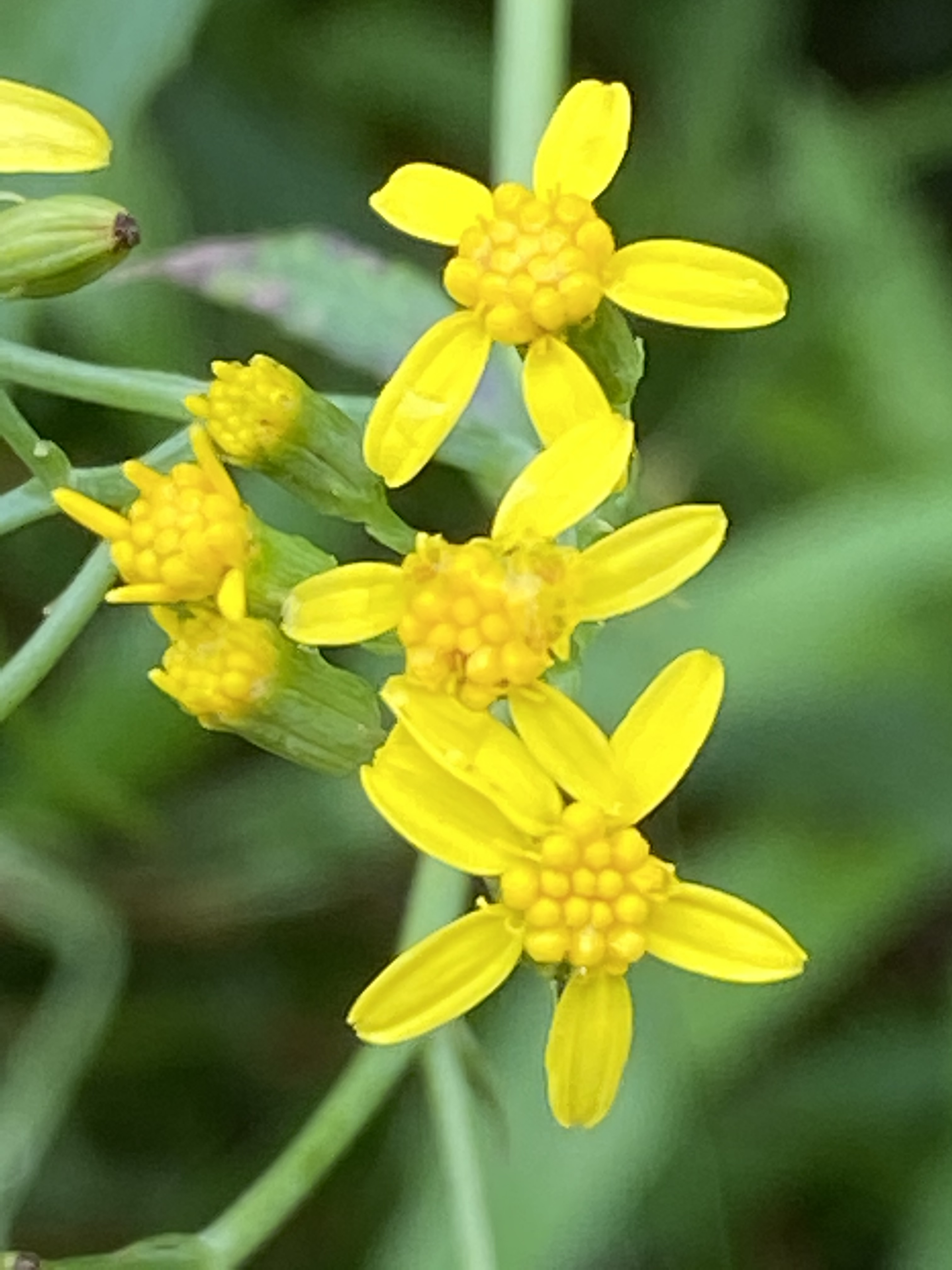

Scientific classification
- Kingdom: Plantae
- Clade: Tracheophytes
- Clade: Angiosperms
- Clade: Eudicots
- Clade: Asterids
- Order: Asterales
- Family: Asteraceae
- Genus: Senecio
- Species: S. linearifolius

Binomial name
- Senecio linearifolius A.Rich.

= Senecio linearifolius =

Fireweed groundsel

Species of flowering plant

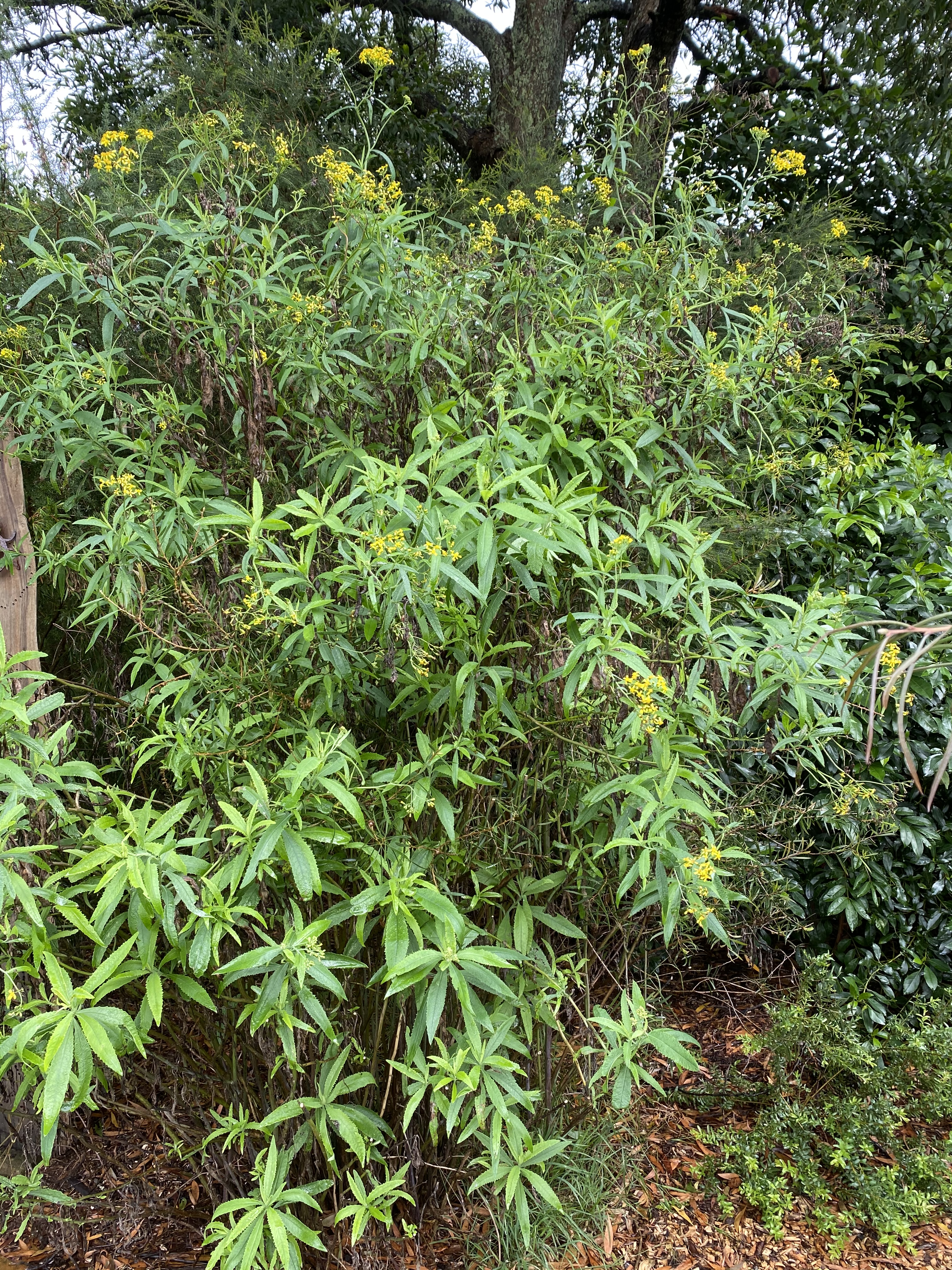
Habit

Senecio linearifolius, commonly known as fireweed groundsel, is a species of flowering plant in the family Asteraceae. It is a small shrub with variable leaves, numerous heads of yellow flowers and grows in Tasmania, New South Wales and Victoria.

== Description ==
Senecio linearifolius is a fragrant, sparse to shrubby perennial to about 1.5 m (4 ft 11 in) high and stems with smooth, fine, downy white hairs. Leaves are variable, linear to egg-shaped, 5–20 cm (2.0–7.9 in) long, 3–50 mm (0.12–1.97 in) wide, usually sessile or with basal lobes, margins smooth, wavy or regularly toothed, lobed at the base or stem clasping. Both surfaces of the leaf are smooth and sparingly to thickly covered in downy white hairs.

=== Inflorescence ===
The inflorescence is a cluster of 20-200 flowers in a corymb about 4–15 cm (1.6–5.9 in) across. The individual flowers are in a grouping of 4–8 with a yellow centre. The fruit is a narrowly oblong-shaped cypsela, 1.5–2 mm (0.059–0.079 in) long, light coloured to reddish-brown, surface with scattered or bands of hairs. Flowering occurs mostly from November to March.

== Taxonomy and naming ==
Senecio linearifolius was first formally described by Achille Richard and the description was published in Voyage de Decouvertes de l'Astrolabe. Botanique. The specific epithet (linearifolius) means linear leaved.

== Distribution and habitat ==
Fireweed groundsel occurs in south-eastern Australia including Tasmania in moist habitats. In New South Wales it occurs mostly on the ranges south of Tenterfield and west to Nundle. In Victoria it is found in the Grampians, Brisbane Ranges, near Portland and Euroa.
