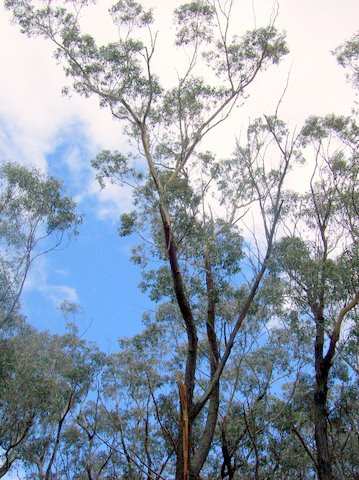
- Silvertop ash at Katoomba

Scientific classification
- Kingdom: Plantae
- Clade: Embryophytes
- Clade: Tracheophytes
- Clade: Spermatophytes
- Clade: Angiosperms
- Clade: Eudicots
- Clade: Rosids
- Order: Myrtales
- Family: Myrtaceae
- Genus: Eucalyptus
- Species: E. sieberi

Binomial name
- Eucalyptus sieberi L.A.S.Johnson

Synonyms
- Eucalyptus sieberiana F.Muell. nom. illeg., nom. superfl.; Eucalyptus virgata Sieber ex Spreng. p.p.; Eucalyptus virgata Sieber ex Spreng. var. virgata

= Eucalyptus sieberi =

Silvertop ash

Species of eucalyptus

Eucalyptus sieberi, commonly known as the silvertop ash or black ash, is a species of medium-sized to tall tree that is endemic to south-eastern Australia. It has rough bark on the trunk and the base of larger branches, and smooth bark above. It has lance-shaped to curved adult leaves and flower buds in groups of seven to fifteen, which bear white flowers and barrel-shaped or conical fruit.

== Description ==
Eucalyptus sieberi typically grows to a height of 25–45 m (82–148 ft) and does not form a lignotuber. It has rough bark on the trunk and the larger branches, and smooth, white to yellow bark above. The rough bark is thin and flaky on younger trees but, with age, it becomes thick, dark grey to black, and furrowed. Young trees have egg-shaped to lance-shaped or curved, bluish green to glaucous leaves that are 60–170 mm (2.4–6.7 in) long and 16–75 mm (0.63–2.95 in) wide. Adult leaves are the same shade of glossy green on both sides, lance-shaped to curved, 85–195 mm (3.3–7.7 in) long and 12–38 mm (0.47–1.50 in) wide on a petiole 10–20 mm (0.39–0.79 in) long.

The flower buds are arranged in leaf axils in groups of between seven and fifteen, on an unbranched peduncle 8–16 mm (0.31–0.63 in) long, with the individual buds on pedicels being 3–7 mm (0.12–0.28 in) long. Mature buds are oval to club-shaped, 3–5 mm (0.12–0.20 in) long and 3–4 mm (0.12–0.16 in) wide, with a rounded or flattened operculum. Flowering occurs from September to January and the flowers are white. The fruit is a woody barrel-shaped or conical capsule, 6–11 mm (0.24–0.43 in) long and 6–9 mm (0.24–0.35 in) wide, with the valves near rim level.

== Taxonomy and naming ==
Eucalyptus sieberi was first formally described in 1962 by Lawrie Johnson in Contributions from the New South Wales Herbarium, from specimens collected by Joseph Maiden in Blackheath in 1899. The specific epithet (sieberi) honours the Czech botanist Franz Sieber.

== Distribution and habitat ==
Silvertop ash grows in forest and woodland, often in pure stands, on shallow soils of low to medium fertility. It is found in south-eastern Queensland, through the western slopes and plains of New South Wales, the eastern side of the Great Dividing Range in Victoria, and north-eastern Tasmania.

== Uses ==
The timber is used in general construction, flooring, decking, handles and woodchipping. It is one of the major species being converted into export wood chips at Eden for writing paper production.

== Significant individuals ==
The largest known living tree is located on Church Hill in Nelson, New Zealand.

== Gallery ==
Features of the silvertop ash (Eucalyptus sieberi)
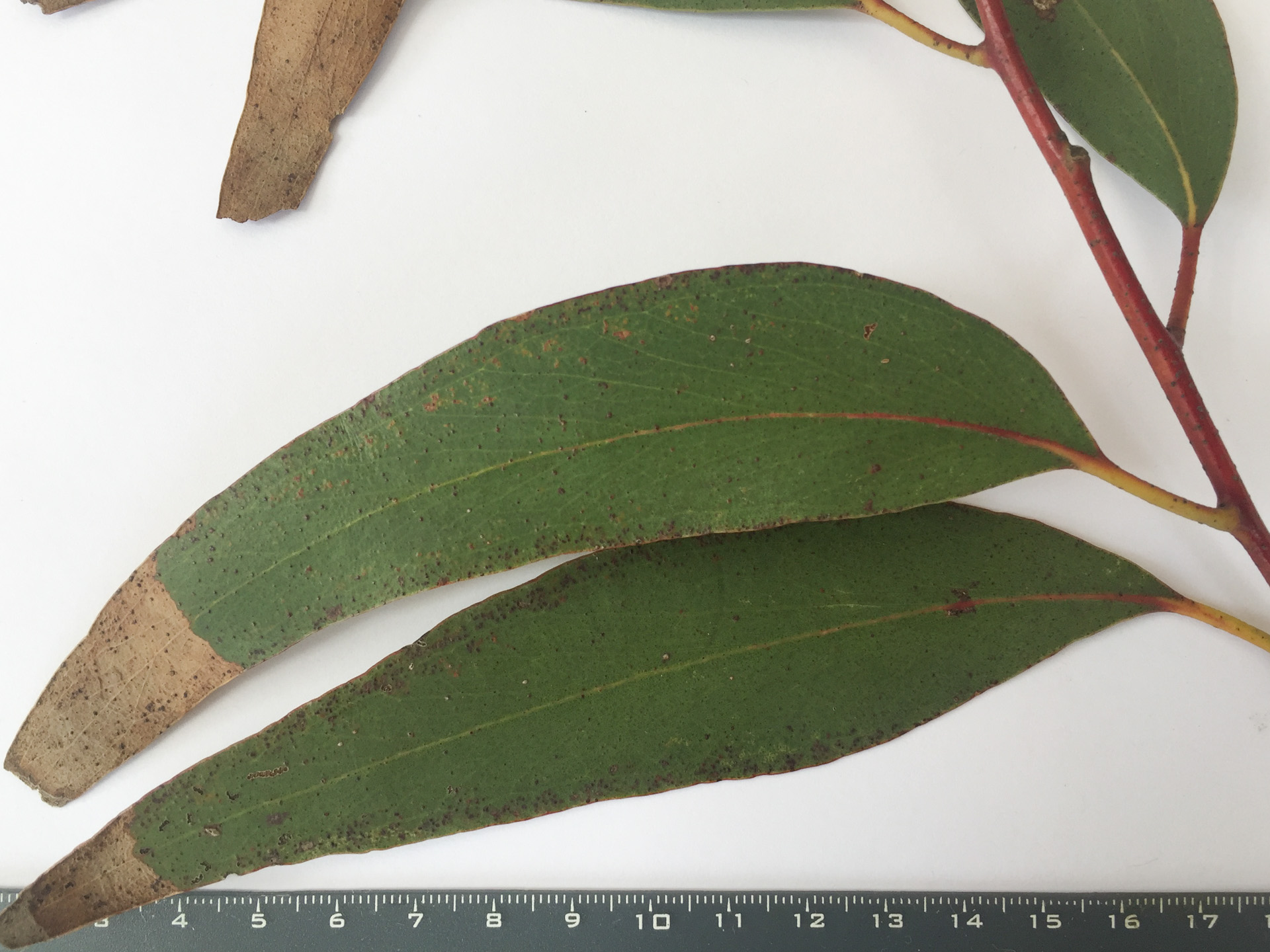
Adult leaves

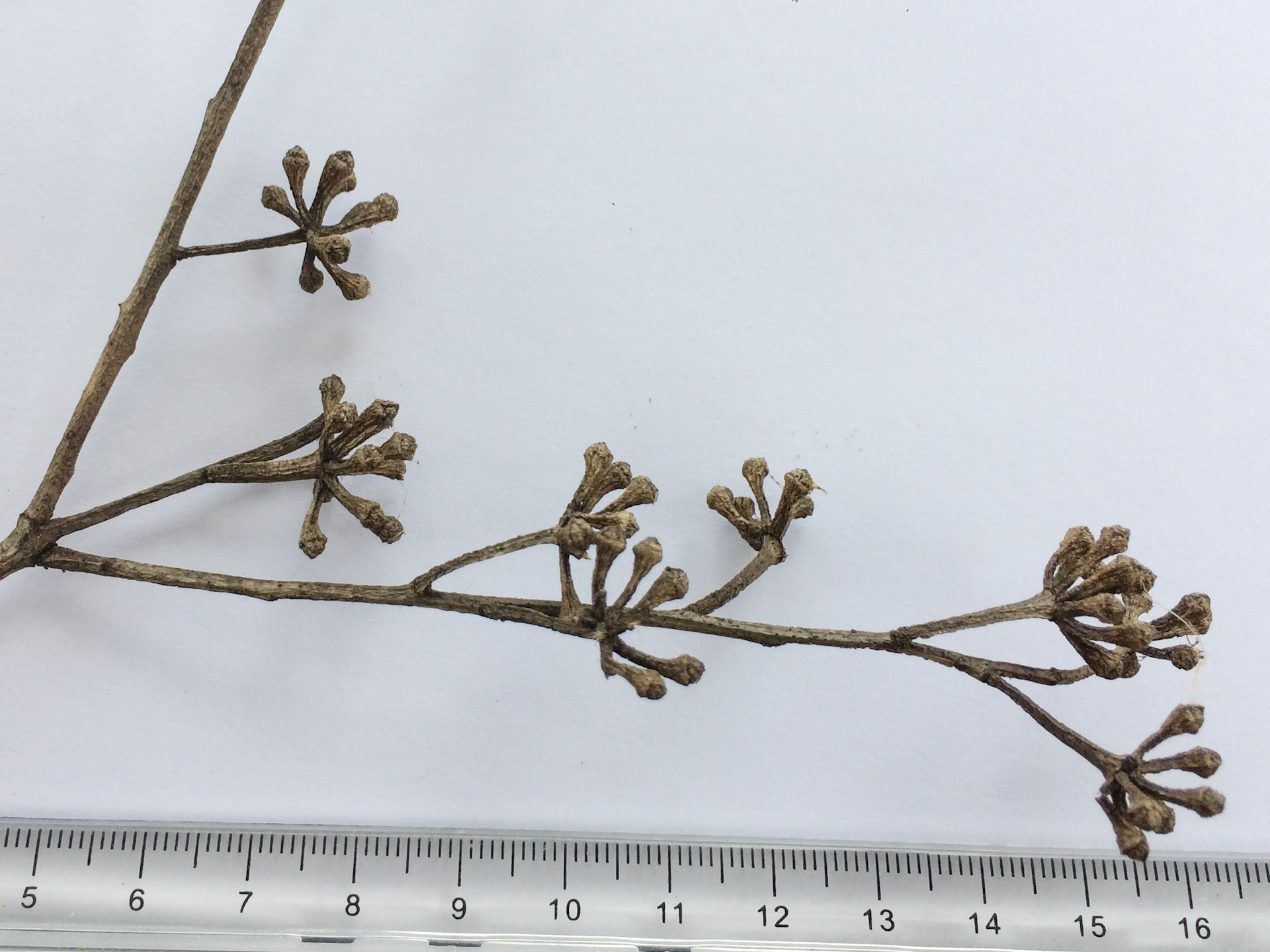
Buds

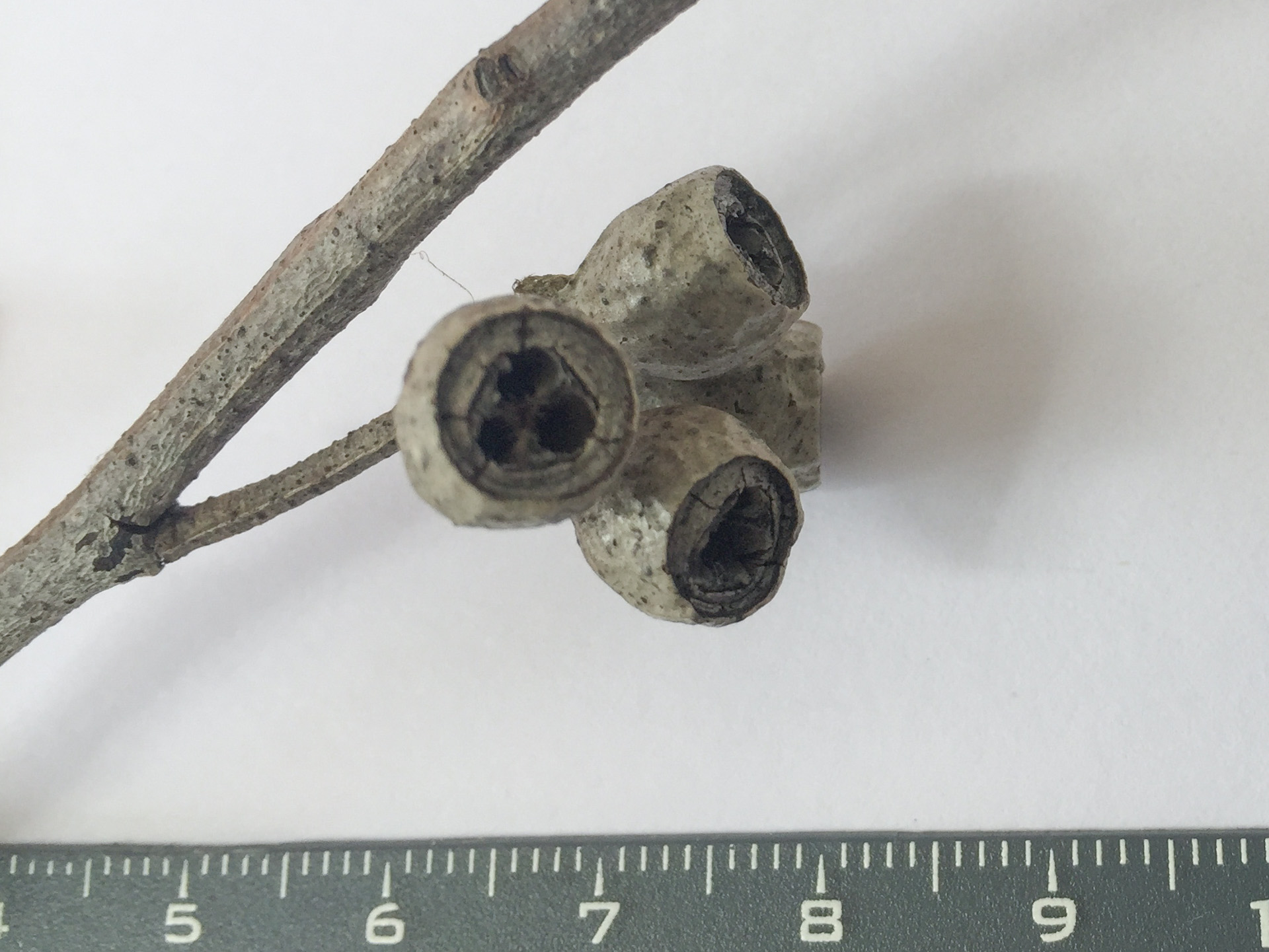
Fruit

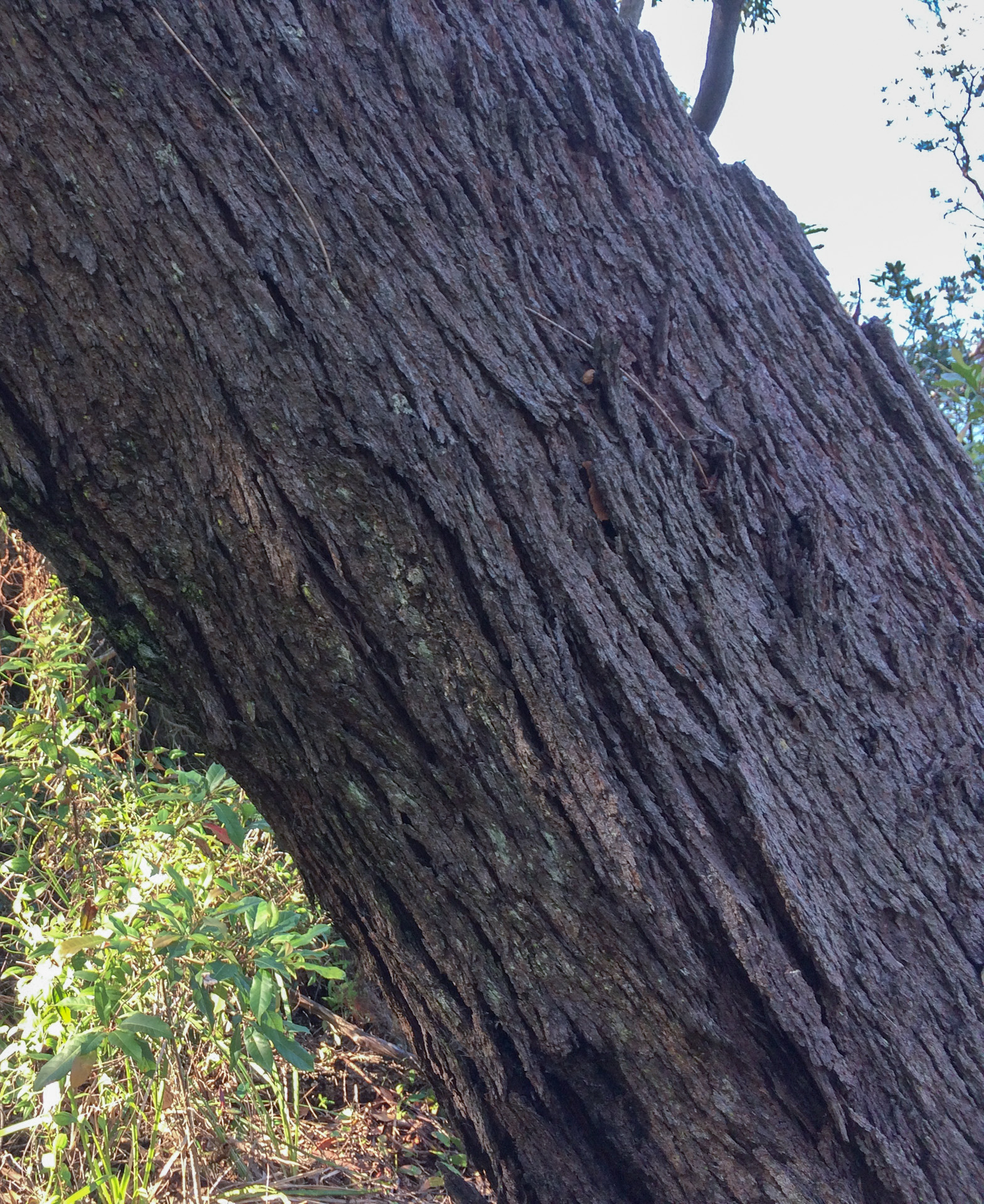
Trunk bark

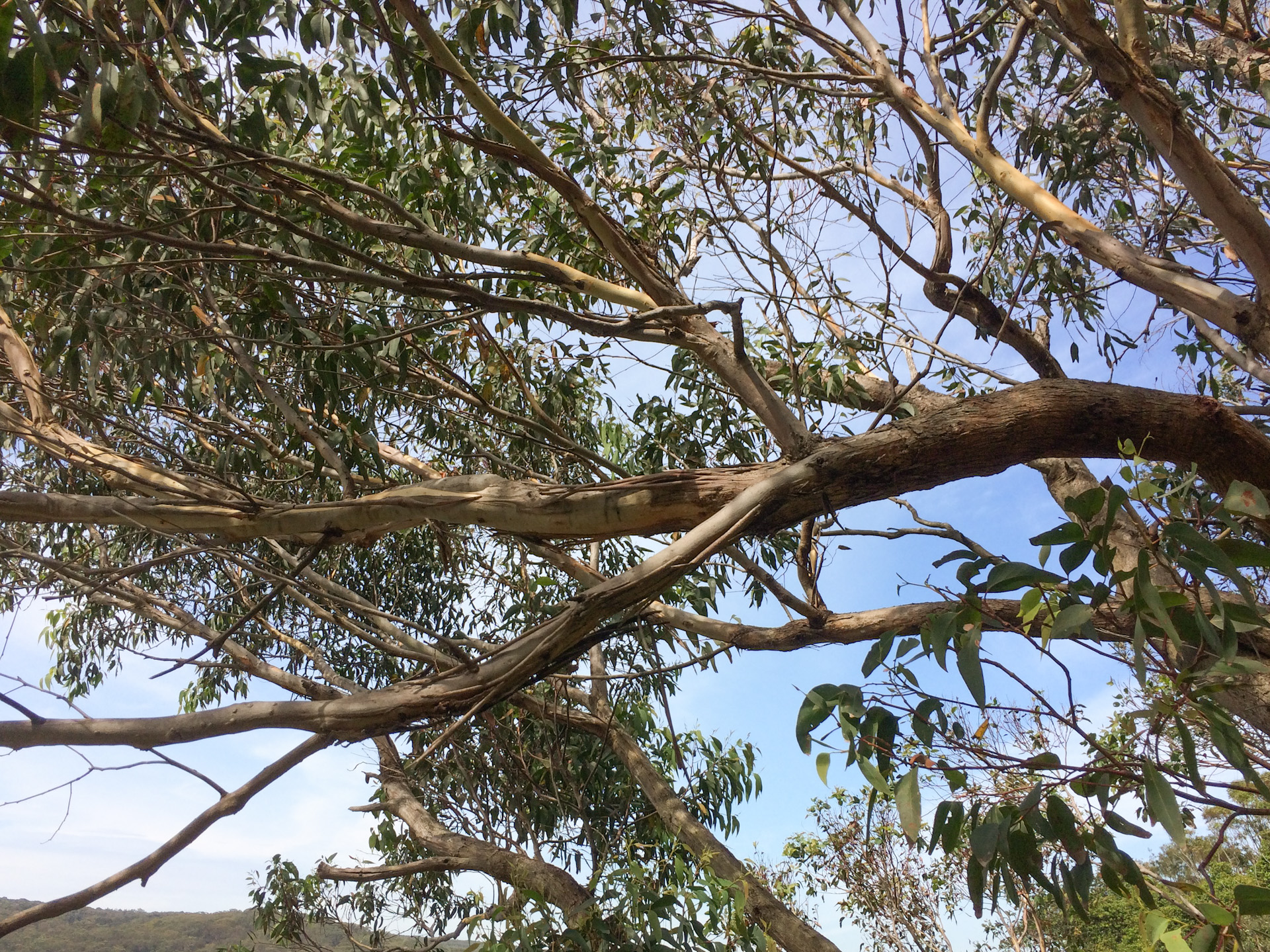
Upper branch bark
